= Spanish missions in California =

18th to 19th-century Catholic religious outposts in California

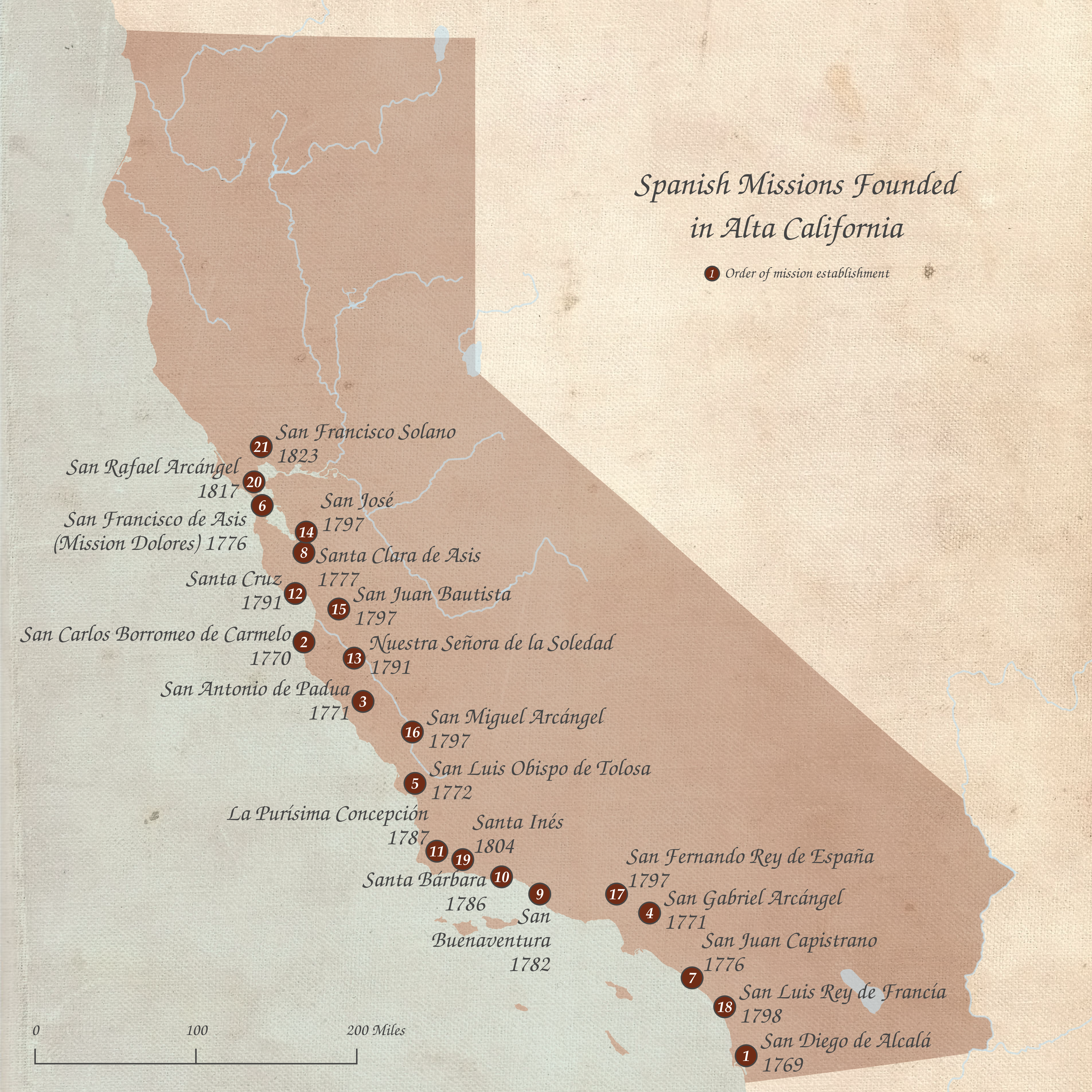
The locations of the 21 Franciscan missions in Alta California.

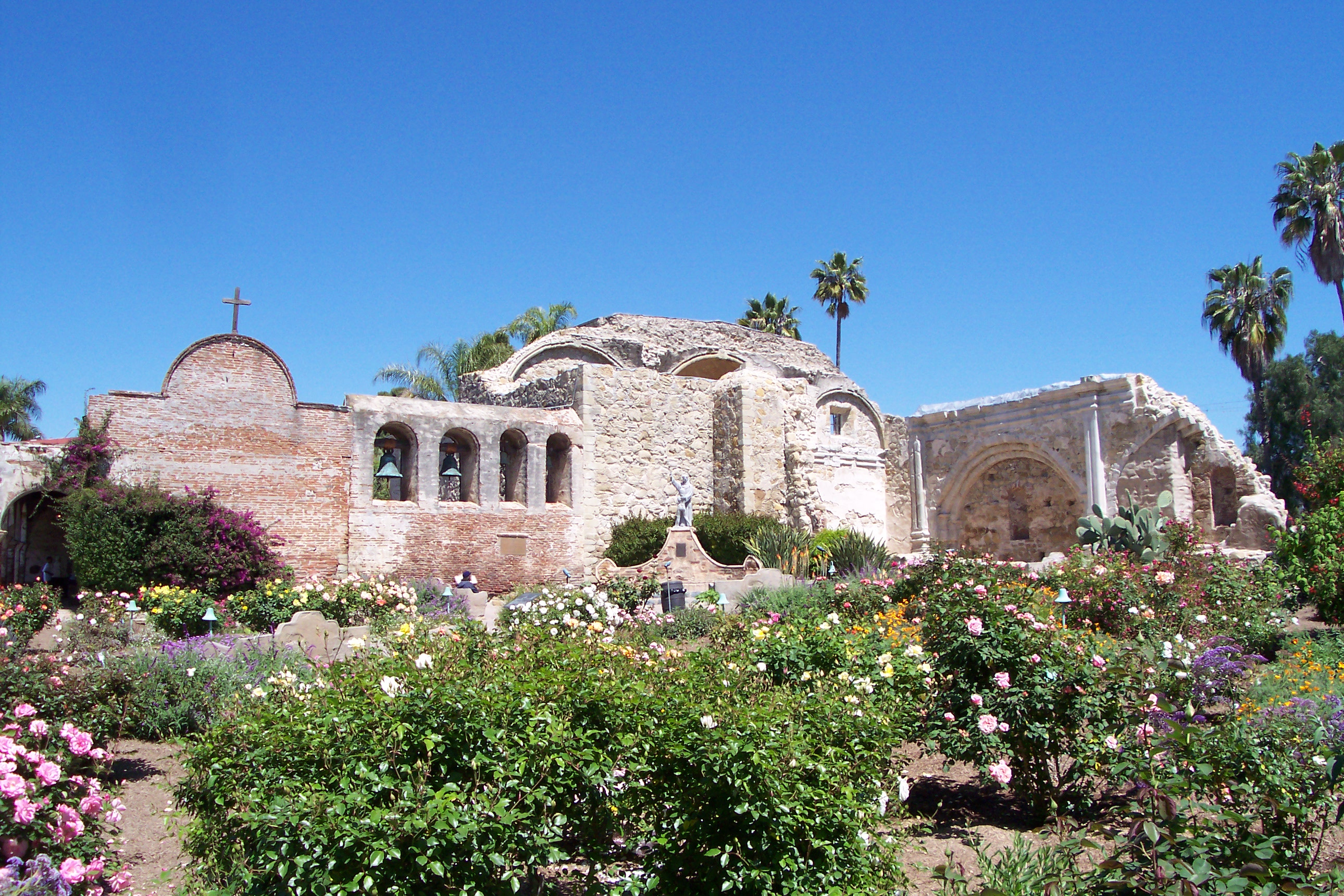
A view of Mission San Juan Capistrano. At left is the façade of the first adobe church with its added espadaña; behind the campanario, or "bell wall" is the "Sacred Garden". The Mission has earned a reputation as the "Loveliest of the Franciscan Ruins".

The Spanish missions in California (Spanish: Misiones españolas en California) formed a series of 21 religious outposts or missions established between 1769 and 1833 in what is now the U.S. state of California. The missions were established by Catholic priests of the Franciscan order to evangelize indigenous peoples backed by the military force of the Spanish Empire. The missions were part of the expansion and settlement of New Spain through the formation of Alta California, expanding the empire into the most northern and western parts of Spanish North America. Civilian settlers and soldiers accompanied missionaries and formed settlements like the Pueblo de Los Ángeles.

Indigenous peoples were forced into settlements called reductions, disrupting their traditional way of life and negatively affecting as many as one thousand villages. European diseases spread in the close quarters of the missions, causing mass death. Abuse, malnourishment, and overworking were common. At least 87,787 baptisms and 63,789 deaths occurred. Indigenous peoples often resisted and rejected conversion to Christianity. Some fled the missions while others formed rebellions. Missionaries recorded frustrations with getting indigenous people to internalize Catholic scripture and practice. Indigenous girls were taken away from their parents and housed at monjeríos. The missions' role in destroying Indigenous culture has been described as cultural genocide.

By 1810, Spain's king had been imprisoned by the French, and financing for military payroll and missions in California ceased. In 1821, Mexico achieved independence from Spain, yet did not send a governor to California until 1824. The missions maintained authority over indigenous peoples and land holdings until the 1830s. At the peak of their influence in 1832, the coastal mission system controlled approximately one-sixth of Alta California. The First Mexican Republic secularized the missions with the Mexican Secularization Act of 1833, which emancipated indigenous peoples from the missions. The missions were closed down, their priests mostly returned to Mexico. The churches ended religious services and fell into disrepair. The farmlands were seized and were largely given to settlers and soldiers, along with a minority of indigenous people.

In 1840 the Church erected the new Roman Catholic Diocese of California.

The surviving mission buildings are the state of California's oldest structures and most-visited historic monuments, many of which were restored after falling into near disrepair in the early 20th century. They have become a symbol of California, appearing in many movies and television shows, and are an inspiration for Mission Revival architecture. Concerns have been raised by historians and Indigenous peoples of California about the way the mission period in California is taught in educational institutions and memorialized. The oldest European settlements of California were formed around or near Spanish missions, including the four largest: Los Angeles, San Diego, San Jose, and San Francisco. Santa Barbara, and Santa Cruz were also formed near missions, and the historical imprint reached as far north as Sonoma in what became the wine country.

== Alta California mission planning, structure, and culture ==
=== Coastal mission chain, planning and overview ===
Prior to 1754, grants of mission lands were made directly by the Spanish Crown. But, given the remote locations and the inherent difficulties in communicating with the territorial governments, he delegated authority to make grants to the viceroys of New Spain. During the reign of King Charles III, they granted lands to allow establishing the Alta California missions. They were motivated in part by presence of Russian fur traders along the California coast in the mid-1700s.

The missions were to be interconnected by an overland route which later became known as the Camino Real (Royal Road). The detailed planning and direction of the missions was to be carried out by Friar Junípero Serra, O.F.M. (who, in 1767, along with his fellow priests, had taken control over a group of missions in Baja California Peninsula previously administered by the Jesuits). After Serra's death, Rev. Fermín Francisco de Lasuén established nine more mission sites, from 1786 through 1798; others established the last three compounds, along with at least five asistencias (mission assistance outposts).

=== Shelved plans for additional mission chains ===
Work on the coastal mission chain was concluded in 1823, completed after Serra's death in 1784. Plans to build a twenty-second mission in Santa Rosa in 1827 were canceled. (Note: "By that time, it was found that the Russian colonies were not such undesirable neighbors as in 1817 it was thought they might become... the Russian scare, for the time being at least was over; and as for the old enthusiasm for new spiritual conquests, there was none left.")

The Rev. Pedro Estévan Tápis proposed establishing a mission on one of the Channel Islands in the Pacific Ocean off San Pedro Harbor in 1784, with either Santa Catalina or Santa Cruz (known as Limú to the Tongva residents) being the most likely locations, the reasoning being that an offshore mission might have attracted potential people to convert who were not living on the mainland, and could have been an effective measure to restrict smuggling operations. Governor José Joaquín de Arrillaga approved the plan the following year; however, an outbreak of sarampión (measles) killing some 200 Tongva people coupled with a scarcity of land for agriculture and potable water left the success of such a venture in doubt, so no effort to found an island mission was ever made.

In September 1821, the Rev. Mariano Payeras, "Comisario Prefecto" of the California missions, visited Cañada de Santa Ysabel east of Mission San Diego de Alcalá as part of a plan to establish an entire chain of inland missions. The Santa Ysabel Asistencia had been founded in 1818 as a "mother" mission. However, the plan's expansion never came to fruition.

=== Mission sites, selection and layout ===
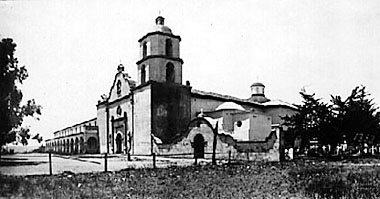
Mission San Luis Rey de Francia, circa 1910. This mission is architecturally distinctive because of the strong Moorish lines exhibited.

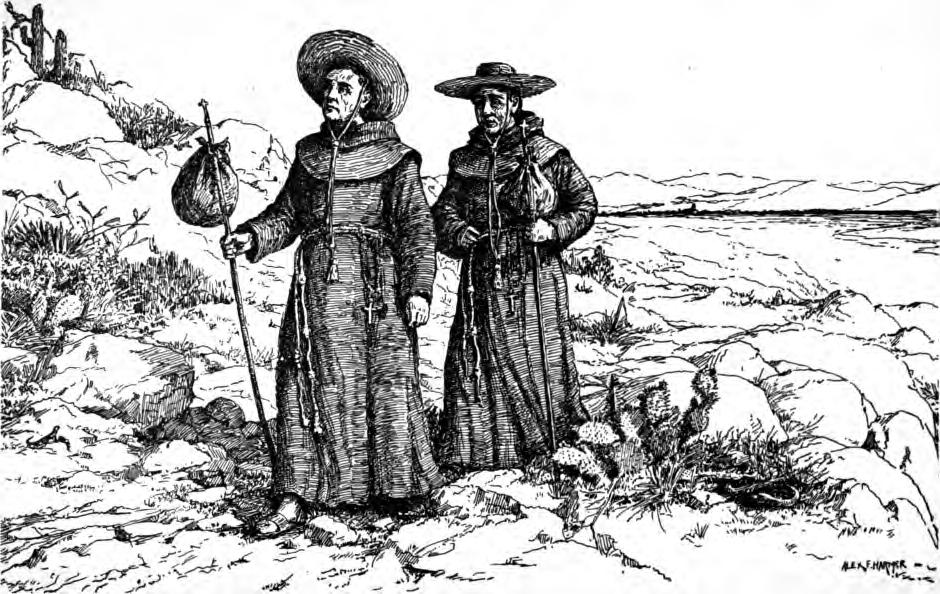
The Missionaries as They Came and Went. Franciscans of the California missions donned gray habits, in contrast to the brown that is typically worn today.

In addition to the presidio (royal fort) and pueblo (town), the misión was one of the three major agencies employed by the Spanish sovereign to extend its borders and consolidate its colonial territories. Asistencias ("satellite" or "sub" missions, sometimes referred to as "contributing chapels") were small-scale missions that regularly conducted Mass on days of obligation but lacked a resident priest; as with the missions, these settlements were typically established in areas with high concentrations of potential native converts. The Spanish Californians had never strayed from the coast when establishing their settlements; Mission Nuestra Señora de la Soledad was located farthest inland, being only some thirty miles (48 kilometers) from the shore. Each frontier station was forced to be self-supporting, as existing means of supply were inadequate to maintain a colony of any size. California was months away from the nearest base in colonized Mexico, and the cargo ships of the day were too small to carry more than a few months' rations in their holds. To sustain a mission, the padres required converted Native Americans, called neophytes, to cultivate crops and tend livestock in the volume needed to support a fair-sized establishment. The scarcity of imported materials, together with a lack of skilled laborers, compelled the missionaries to employ simple building materials and methods in the construction of mission structures.

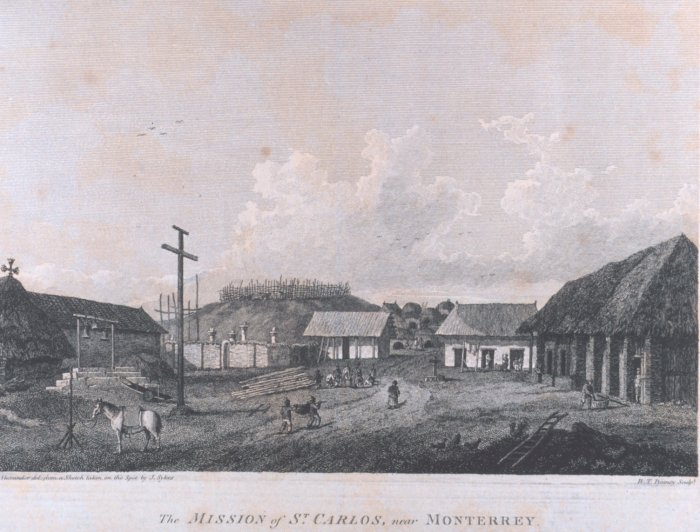
A drawing of Mission San Carlos Borromeo de Carmelo prepared by Captain George Vancouver depicts the grounds as they appeared in November 1792. From A Voyage of Discovery to the North Pacific Ocean and Round the World.

Although the missions were considered temporary ventures by the Spanish hierarchy, the development of an individual settlement was not simply a matter of "priestly whim". The founding of a mission followed longstanding rules and procedures; the paperwork involved required months, sometimes years of correspondence, and demanded the attention of virtually every level of the bureaucracy. Once empowered to erect a mission in a given area, the men assigned to it chose a specific site that featured a good water supply, plenty of wood for fires and building materials, and ample fields for grazing herds and raising crops. The padres blessed the site, and with the aid of their military escort fashioned temporary shelters out of tree limbs or driven stakes, roofed with thatch or reeds (cañas). It was these simple huts that ultimately gave way to the stone and adobe buildings that exist to the present.

The first priority when beginning a settlement was the location and construction of the church (iglesia). The majority of mission sanctuaries were oriented on a roughly east–west axis to take the best advantage of the sun's position for interior illumination; the exact alignment depended on the geographic features of the particular site. Once the spot for the church had been selected, its position was marked and the remainder of the mission complex was laid out. The workshops, kitchens, living quarters, storerooms, and other ancillary chambers were usually grouped in the form of a quadrangle, inside which religious celebrations and other festive events often took place. The cuadrángulo was rarely a perfect square because the missionaries had no surveying instruments at their disposal and simply measured off all dimensions by foot. Some fanciful accounts regarding the construction of the missions claimed that tunnels were incorporated in the design, to be used as a means of emergency egress in the event of attack; however, no historical evidence (written or physical) has ever been uncovered to support these assertions. (Note: Engelhardt: One such hypothesis was put forth by author by Prent Duel in his 1919 work Mission Architecture as Exemplified in San Xavier Del Bac: "Most missions of early date possessed secret passages as a means of escape in case they were besieged. It is difficult to locate any of them now as they are well concealed.")

=== Franciscans and native conscription ===
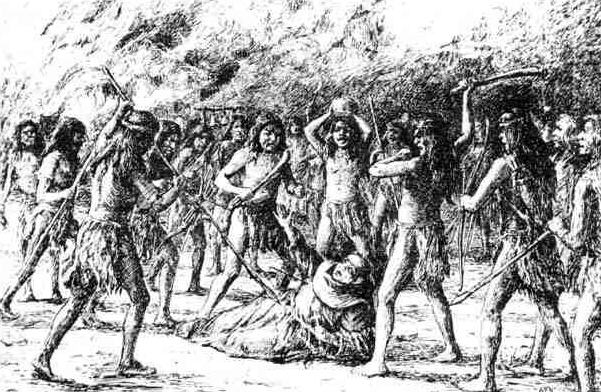
An illustration depicts the death of the Rev. Luís Jayme by angry locals at Mission San Diego de Alcalá, November 4, 1775. The independence uprising was the first of a dozen similar incidents that took place in Alta California during the Mission Period; however, most rebellions tended to be localized and short-lived due to the Spaniards' superior weaponry (native resistance more often took the form of non-cooperation (in forced labor), return to their homelands (desertion of forced relocation), and raids on mission livestock). (Note: Chapman: "Latter-day historians have been altogether too prone to regard the hostility to the Spaniards on the part of the California Indians as a matter of small consequence, since no disaster in fact ever happened...On the other hand the San Diego plot involved untold thousands of Indians, being virtually a national uprising, and owing to the distance from New Spain to and the extreme difficulty of maintaining communications a victory for the Indians would have ended Spanish settlement in Alta California." As it turned out, "...the position of the Spaniards was strengthened by the San Diego outbreak, for the Indians felt from that time forth that it was impossible to throw out their conquerors." See also Mission Puerto de Purísima Concepción and Mission San Pedro y San Pablo de Bicuñer regarding the Yuma 'massacres' of 1781.) (Note: Engelhardt: Not all of the native cultures responded with hostility to the Spaniards' presence; Engelhardt portrayed the natives at Mission San Juan Capistrano (dubbed the "Juaneño" by the missionaries), where there was never any instance of unrest, as being "uncommonly friendly and docile." The Rev. Juan Crespí, who accompanied the 1769 expedition, described the first encounter with the area's inhabitants: "They came unarmed and with a gentleness which has no name they brought their poor seeds to us as gifts...The locality itself and the docility of the Indians invited the establishment of a Mission for them.")

The Alta California missions, known as reductions (reducciones) or congregations (congregaciones), were settlements founded by the Spanish colonizers of the New World with the purpose of totally assimilating indigenous populations into European culture and the Catholic religion. It was a doctrine established in 1531, which based the Spanish state's right over the land and persons of the Indies on the Papal charge to evangelize them. It was employed wherever the indigenous populations were not already concentrated in native pueblos. Indians were congregated around the mission proper through forced resettlement, in which the Spanish "reduced" them from what they perceived to be a free "undisciplined'" state with the ambition of converting them into "civilized" members of colonial society. The civilized and disciplined culture of the natives, developed over 8,000 years, was not considered. A total of 146 Friars Minor, mostly Spaniards by birth, were ordained as priests and served in California between 1769 and 1845. Sixty-seven missionaries died at their posts (two as martyrs: Padres Luis Jayme and Andrés Quintana), while the remainder returned to Europe due to illness, or upon completing their ten-year service commitment. As the rules of the Franciscan Order forbade friars to live alone, two missionaries were assigned to each settlement, sequestered in the mission's convento. To these the governor assigned a guard of five or six soldiers under the command of a corporal, who generally acted as steward of the mission's temporal affairs, subject to the priests' direction.

Indians were initially attracted into the mission compounds by gifts of food, colored beads, bits of bright cloth, and trinkets. Once a Native American "gentile" was baptized, they were labeled a neophyte, or new believer. This happened only after a brief period during which the initiates were instructed in the most basic aspects of the Catholic faith. But, while many natives were lured to join the missions out of curiosity and sincere desire to participate and engage in trade, many found themselves trapped once they were baptized. On the other hand, Indians staffed the militias at each mission and had a role in mission governance.

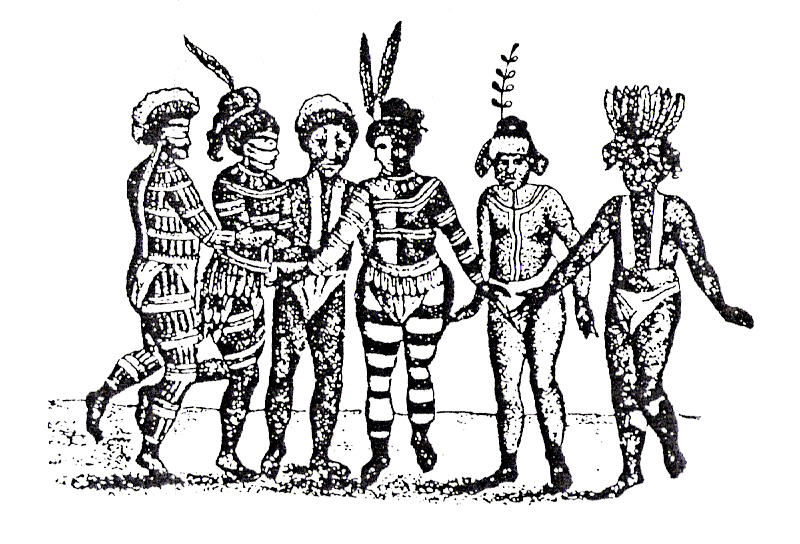
Georg von Langsdorff, an early visitor to California, sketched a group of Costeño dancers at Mission San José in 1806. "The hair of these people is very coarse, thick, and stands erect; in some it is powdered with down feathers," Langsdorff noted. "Their bodies are fantastically painted with charcoal dust, red clay, and chalk. The foremost dancer is ornamented all over with down feathers, which gives him a monkey-like appearance; the hindermost has had the whimsical idea of painting his body to imitate the uniform of a Spanish soldier, with his boots, stockings, breeches, and upper garments."

To the padres, a baptized Indian person was no longer free to move about the country, but had to labor and worship at the mission under the strict observance of the priests and overseers, who herded them to daily masses and labors. If an Indian did not report for their duties for a period of a few days, they were searched for, and if it was discovered that they had left without permission, they were considered runaways. Large-scale military expeditions were organized to round up the escaped neophytes. Sometimes, the Franciscans allowed neophytes to escape the missions, or they would allow them to visit their home village. However, the Franciscans would only allow this so that they could secretly follow the neophytes. Upon arriving to the village and capturing the runaways, they would take back Indians to the missions, sometimes as many as 200 to 300 Indians.

On one occasion," writes Hugo Reid, "they went as far as the present Rancho del Chino, where they tied and whipped every man, woman and child in the lodge, and drove part of them back.... On the road they did the same with those of the lodge at San Jose. On arriving home the men were instructed to throw their bows and arrows at the feet of the priest, and make due submission. The infants were then baptized, as were also all children under eight years of age; the former were left with their mothers, but the latter kept apart from all communication with their parents. The consequence was, first, the women consented to the rite and received it, for the love they bore their children; and finally the males gave way for the purpose of enjoying once more the society of wife and family. Marriage was then performed, and so this contaminated race, in their own sight and that of their kindred, became followers of Christ.

A total of 20,355 natives were "attached" to the California missions in 1806 (the highest figure recorded during the Mission Period); under Mexican rule the number rose to 21,066 (in 1824, the record year during the entire era of the Franciscan missions). (Note: Chapman: "Over the hills of the Coast Range, in the valleys of the Sacramento and San Joaquin, north of San Francisco Bay, and in the Sierra Nevadas of the south there were untold thousands whom the mission system never reached...they were as if in a world apart from the narrow strip of coast which was all there was of the Spanish California.") During the entire period of Mission rule, from 1769 to 1834, the Franciscans baptized 53,600 adult Indians and buried 37,000. Dr. Cook estimates that 15,250 or 45% of the population decrease was caused by disease. Two epidemics of measles, one in 1806 and the other in 1828, caused many deaths. The mortality rates were so high that the missions were constantly dependent upon new conversions.

Young native women were required to reside in the monjerío (or "nunnery") under the supervision of a trusted Indian matron who bore the responsibility for their welfare and education. Women only left the convent after they had been "won" by an Indian suitor and were deemed ready for marriage. Following Spanish custom, courtship took place on either side of a barred window. After the marriage ceremony the woman moved out of the mission compound and into one of the family huts. These "nunneries" were considered a necessity by the priests, who felt the women needed to be protected from the men, both Indian and de razón ("instructed men", i.e. Europeans). The cramped and unsanitary conditions the girls lived in contributed to the fast spread of disease and population decline. So many died at times that many of the Indian residents of the missions urged the priests to raid new villages to supply them with more women.

==== Death rate at the missions ====
As of December 31, 1832 (the peak of the mission system's development) the mission padres had performed a combined total of 87,787 baptisms and 24,529 marriages, and recorded 63,789 deaths. The death rate at the missions, particularly of children, was very high and the majority of children baptized did not survive childhood. At Mission San Gabriel, for instance, three of four children died before reaching the age of two.

The high rate of death at the missions have been attributed to several factors, including disease, torture, overworking, malnourishment, and cultural genocide. Forcing native people into close quarters at the missions spread disease quickly. While being kept at the missions, native people were transitioned to a Spanish diet that left them more unable to ward off diseases, the most common being dysentery, fevers with unknown causes, and venereal disease.

The death rate has been compared to that of other atrocities. American author and lawyer Carey McWilliams argued that "the Franciscan padres eliminated Indians with the effectiveness of Nazis operating concentration camps."

No.	Name	Baptisms and/or Indigenous population	Deaths and/or remaining pop.	Notes
1	Mission San Diego de Alcalá	6,638 baptisms total (2,685 children)	4,428 deaths total	From 1810 to 1820, "the death rate among the neophytes was 77% of baptisms and 35% of the population." Only 34 families remained after the mission was secularized in 1833.
2	Mission San Luis Rey de Francia	5,401 baptisms total (1,862 children) 2,869 people in 1826		
3	Mission San Juan Capistrano	4,317 baptisms total (2,628 children)	3,153 deaths total	
4	Mission San Gabriel Arcángel	7,854 baptisms total (2,459 children) 1,701 people in 1817	5,656 deaths total (2,916 children) 1,320 people in 1834	A missionary reported that three out of four children died at the mission before reaching the age of 2.
5	Mission San Fernando Rey de España	1,367 children baptized 1,080 people in 1819	965 children died	"It was not strange that the fearful death rate both of children and adults at the missions sometimes frightened the neophytes into running away."
6	Mission San Buenaventura	3,805 baptisms total (1,909 children) 1,330 people in 1816	626 people remaining in 1834	Hubert Howe Bancroft estimated that there were about 250 people in 1840 remaining from the mission living in scattered communities.
7	Mission Santa Barbara	1,792 people in 1803	556 people remaining in 1834	"At such a rate it would not, even if mission rule had continued, have taken more than a dozen years to depopulate the mission."
8	Mission Santa Inés	757 children baptized 770 people in 1816	519 children died 334 people remaining in 1834	
9	Mission La Purísima Concepción	1,492 children baptized total 1,520 people in 1804	902 children died 407 people in remaining in 1834	
10	Mission San Luis Obispo de Tolosa	2,608 baptisms total (1,331`children) 852 people in 1803	264 people remaining in 1834	
11	Mission San Miguel Arcángel	2,588 baptisms total 1,076 people in 1814	2,038 deaths total 599 people remaining in 1834	"The lowest death rate in any of the missions."
12	Mission San Antonio de Padua	4,348 baptisms total (2,587 children) 1,296 people in 1805	567 people remaining in 1834	
13	Mission Nuestra Señora de la Soledad	2,222 baptisms total 725 people in 1805	1,803 deaths total 300 people remaining	
14	Mission San Carlos Borromeo de Carmelo	971 people in 1794, 758 in 1800, 513 in 1810, 381 in 1820	150 people remaining in 1834	"At the rate of decrease under mission rule, a few more years would have produced... the extinction of the mission Indian."
15	Mission San Juan Bautista	1,248 people in 1823	850 people remaining in 1834	"The only mission whose population increased from 1810 to 1820. This was due to the fact that its numbers were recruited from the eastern tribes." "The appalling smell from the graveyard saturated the entire Mission building."
16	Mission Santa Cruz	2,466 baptisms total 644 people in 1798	2,034 deaths total 250 people remaining in 1834	
17	Mission Santa Clara de Asís	7,711 baptisms (3,177 children) 927 people in 1790, 1,464 in 1827	150 people remaining in 1834	Very sharp decline in the native population from 1827 to 1834. "The death rate at the mission was very high."
18	Mission San José	6,737 baptisms total 1,754 people in 1820	5,109 deaths total	
19	Mission San Francisco de Asís		880 deaths in 1806 alone	"An epidemic [in 1806] had broken out in the Mission Dolores and a number of the Indians were transferred to San Rafael to escape the plague."
20	Mission San Rafael Arcángel	1,873 baptisms total 1,140 people in 1828	698 deaths total Less than 500 people remaining	
21	Mission San Francisco Solano	1,315 baptisms total 996 people in 1832	651 deaths total About 550 people remaining	

=== Mission labor ===
At least 90,000 Indigenous peoples were kept in well-guarded mission compounds throughout the state as de facto slaves. The policy of the Franciscans was to keep them constantly occupied. Bells were vitally important to daily life at any mission. The bells were rung at mealtimes, to call the Mission residents to work and to religious services, during births and funerals, to signal the approach of a ship or returning missionary, and at other times; novices were instructed in the intricate rituals associated with the ringing the mission bells. The daily routine began with sunrise Mass and morning prayers, followed by instruction of the natives in the teachings of the Roman Catholic faith. After a breakfast of atole, the able-bodied men and women were assigned their tasks for the day. The women were committed to dressmaking, knitting, weaving, embroidering, laundering, and cooking, while some of the stronger girls ground flour or carried adobe bricks (weighing 55 lb, or 25 kg each) to the men engaged in building. The men worked a variety of jobs, having learned from the missionaries how to plow, sow, irrigate, cultivate, reap, thresh, and glean. They were taught to build adobe houses, tan leather hides, shear sheep, weave rugs and clothing from wool, make ropes, soap, paint, and other useful duties.

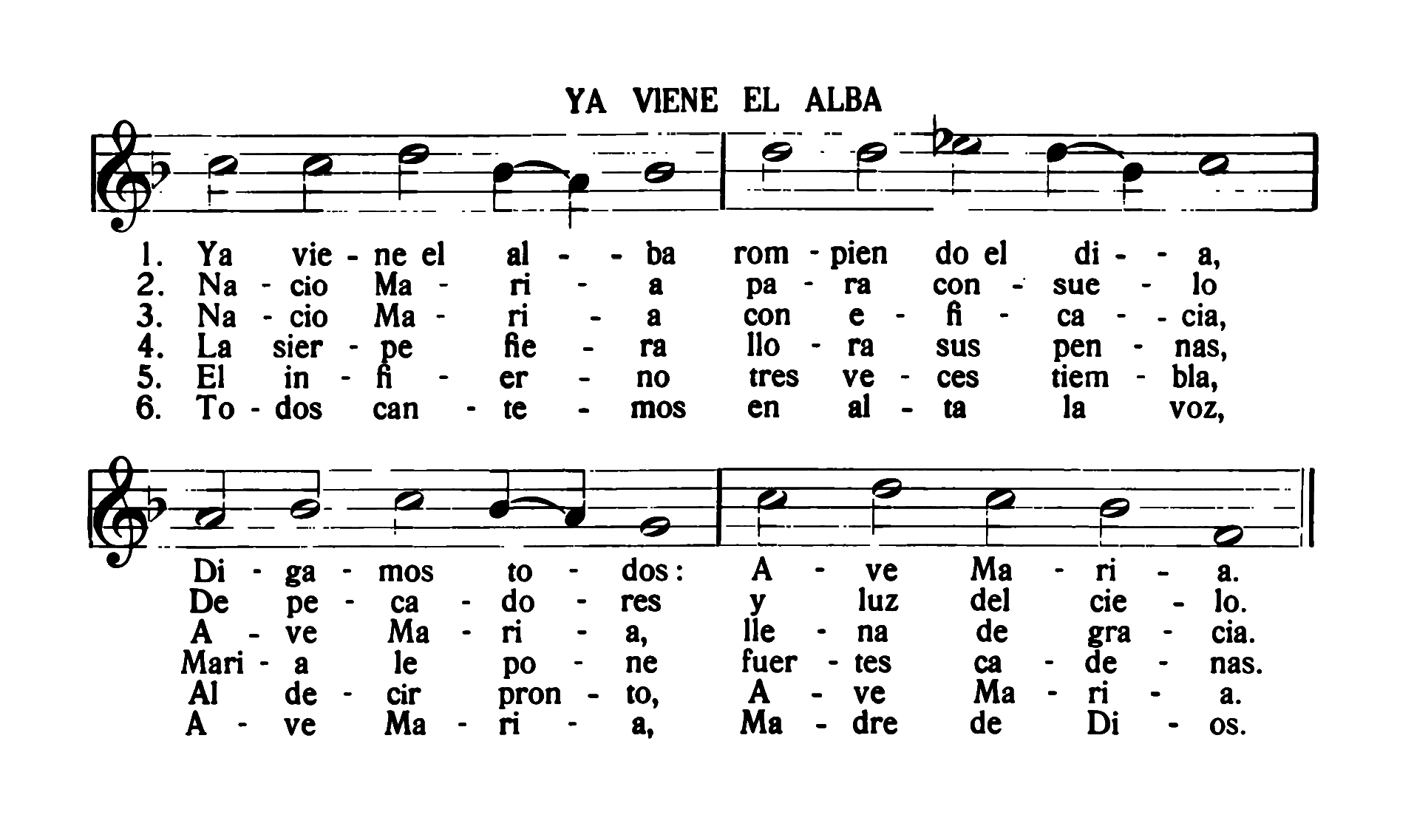
"Ya Viene El Alba" ("The Dawn Already Comes"), typical of the hymns sung at the missions.

The work day was six hours, interrupted by dinner (lunch) around 11:00 a.m. and a two-hour siesta, and ended with evening prayers and the rosary, supper, and social activities. About 90 days out of each year were designated as religious or civil holidays, free from manual labor. The labor organization of the missions resembled a slave plantation in many respects. (Note: Bennett: "The system had singularly failed in its purposes. It was the design of the Spanish government to have the missions educate, elevate, civilize, the Indians into citizens. When this was done, citizenship should be extended them and the missions should be dissolved as having served their purpose...[instead] the priests returned them projects of conversion, schemes of faith, which they never comprehended...He [the Indian] became a slave; the mission was a plantation; the friar was a taskmaster.") Foreigners who visited the missions remarked at how the priests' control over the Indians appeared excessive, but necessary given the white men's isolation and numeric disadvantage. (Note: Bennett: "In 1825 Governor Argüello wrote that the slavery of the Indians at the missions was bestial...Governor Figueroa declared that the missions were 'entrenchments of monastic despotism'...") Subsequently, the Missions operated under strict and harsh conditions; A 'light' punishment would've been considered 25 lashings (azotes). Indians were not paid wages as they were not considered free laborers and, as a result, the missions were able to profit from the goods produced by the Mission Indians to the detriment of the other Spanish and Mexican settlers of the time who could not compete economically with the advantage of the mission system.

The Franciscans began to send neophytes to work as servants of Spanish soldiers in the presidios. Each presidio was provided with land, el rancho del rey, which served as a pasture for the presidio livestock and as a source of food for the soldiers. Theoretically the soldiers were supposed to work on this land themselves but within a few years the neophytes were doing all the work on the presidio farm and, in addition, were serving domestics for the soldiers. While the fiction prevailed that neophytes were to receive wages for their work, no attempt was made to collect the wages for these services after 1790. It is recorded that the neophytes performed the work "under unmitigated compulsion."

In recent years, much debate has arisen about the priests' treatment of the Indians during the Mission period, and many believe that the California mission system is directly responsible for the decline of the native cultures. (Note: Bennett: "It cannot be said that the mission system made the Indians more able to sustain themselves in civilization than it had found them...Upon the whole it may be said that this mission experiment was a failure.") From the perspective of the Spanish priest, their efforts were a well-meaning attempt to improve the lives of the heathen natives. (Note: Lippy: "A matter of debate in reflecting on the role of Spanish missions concerns the degree to which the Spanish colonial regimes regarded the work of the priests as a legitimate religious enterprise and the degree to which it was viewed as a 'frontier institution,' part of a colonial defense program. That is, were Spanish motives based on a desire to promote conversion or on a desire to have religious missions serve as a buffer to protect the main colonial settlements and an aid in controlling the Indians?") (Note: Bennett: The missions in effect served as "...the citadels of the theocracy which was planted in California by Spain, under which its wild inhabitants were subjected, which stood as their guardians, civil and religious, and whose duty it was to elevate them and make them acceptable as citizens and Spanish subjects...it remained for the Spanish priests to undertake to preserve the Indian and seek to make his existence compatible with higher civilization.")

The missionaries of California were by-and-large well-meaning, devoted men...[whose] attitudes toward the Indians ranged from genuine (if paternalistic) affection to wrathful disgust. They were ill-equipped—nor did most truly desire—to understand complex and radically different Native American customs. Using European standards, they condemned the Indians for living in a "wilderness," for worshipping false gods or no God at all, and for having no written laws, standing armies, forts, or churches.

=== Franciscan violence against the native population ===
The Franciscan arrival to Alta California came with a wave of torture, rape, and murder towards the native population of California. Native Californians, attracted to the Missions by the promise of food and gifts, were forcibly prevented from leaving. Any who attempted to escape was usually given a severe beating and put in shackles. Any form of Native rebellion was met with force due to numerical disadvantage facing the Franciscans.

When Native Women attempted to abort their unborn children – which they had conceived as a byproduct of rape, the Friars would have them beaten, chained in iron, shaved, and stipulated to stand in-front of the altar each mass with a decorated wooden newborn.

This trend of violence was due to the Franciscans' desire for a greater Hispanicized population in Alta California, both for protection against a foreign invasion and for a labor force to benefit the Spanish Empire. As a result, a higher emphasis of Native reproduction was a duty taken on by the Spanish Fransicans. Tejana born feminist historian Antonia Castañeda wrote about the treatment that would occur in Mission Santa Cruz:

Father Olbes at Mission Santa Cruz ordered an infertile couple to have sexual intercourse in his presence because he did not believe they could not have children. The couple refused, but Olbes forcibly inspected the man's penis to learn 'whether or not it was in good order' and tried to inspect the woman's genitalia. She refused, fought with him, and tried to bite him. Olbes ordered that she be tied by the hands, and given fifty lashes, shackled, and locked up in the monjerío (women's dormitory). He then had a monigote made and commanded that she "treat the doll as though it were a child and carry it in the presence of everyone for nine days." While the woman was beaten and her sexuality demeaned, the husband, who had been intimate with another woman, was ridiculed and humiliated. A set of cow horns was tied to his head with leather thongs, thereby converting him into a cuckold, and he was herded to daily Mass in cow horns and fetters.

Franciscan Priests would also forbid any form of native culture in the Mission system. This would include but not be limited to, songs, dances, and ceremonies. They objectified the destruction of any form of morality, ideology or personality that characterized the Native life. Women, in particular, would face a higher degree of punishment. Those who did not comply with the Missions demands would be labeled a witch, dehumanizing them for further violence.

University of Chicago Professor Ramon Guttiriez wrote:

One can interpret the whole history of the persecution of Indian women as witches ... as a struggle over [these] competing ways of defining the body and of regulating procreation as the church endeavored to constrain the expression of desire within boundaries that clerics defined proper and acceptable.

=== Mission industries ===
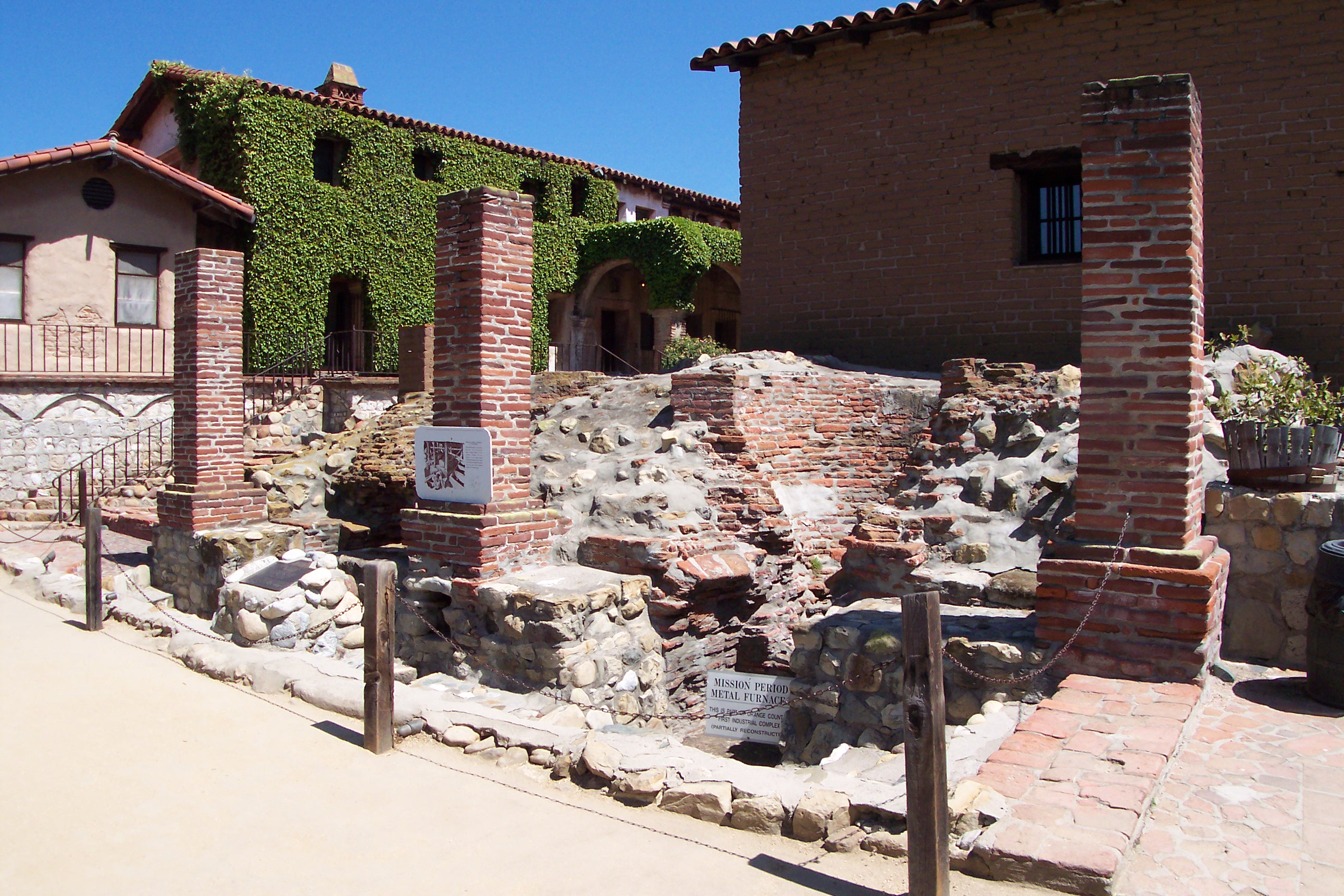
A view of the Catalan forges at Mission San Juan Capistrano, the oldest existing facilities (circa 1790s) of their kind in the State of California. The sign at the lower right-hand corner proclaims the site as being "...part of Orange County's first industrial complex."

The goal of the missions was, above all, to become self-sufficient in relatively short order. Farming, therefore, was the most important industry of any mission. Barley, maize, and wheat were among the most common crops grown. Cereal grains were dried and ground by stone into flour. Even today, California is well known for the abundance and many varieties of fruit trees that are cultivated throughout the state. The only fruits indigenous to the region, however, consisted of wild berries or grew on small bushes. Spanish missionaries brought fruit seeds over from Europe, many of which had been introduced from Asia following earlier expeditions to the continent; orange, grape, apple, peach, pear, and fig seeds were among the most prolific of the imports. Grapes were also grown and fermented into wine for sacramental use and again, for trading. The specific variety, called the Criolla or Mission grape, was first planted at Mission San Juan Capistrano in 1779; in 1783, the first wine produced in Alta California emerged from the mission's winery. Ranching also became an important mission industry as cattle and sheep herds were raised.

Mission San Gabriel Arcángel unknowingly witnessed the origin of the California citrus industry with the planting of the region's first significant orchard in 1804, though the commercial potential of citrus was not realized until 1841. Olives (first cultivated at Mission San Diego de Alcalá) were grown, cured, and pressed under large stone wheels to extract their oil, both for use at the mission and to trade for other goods. The Rev. Serra set aside a portion of the Mission Carmel gardens in 1774 for tobacco plants, a practice that soon spread throughout the mission system. (Note: Bean: "Serra's decision to plant tobacco at the missions was prompted by the fact that from San Diego to Monterey the natives invariably begged him for Spanish tobacco.")

It was also the missions' responsibility to provide the Spanish forts, or presidios, with the necessary foodstuffs, and manufactured goods to sustain operations. It was a constant point of contention between missionaries and the soldiers as to how many fanegas of barley, or how many shirts or blankets the mission had to provide the garrisons on any given year. At times these requirements were hard to meet, especially during years of drought, or when the much anticipated shipments from the port of San Blas failed to arrive. The Spaniards kept meticulous records of mission activities, and each year reports submitted to the Father-Presidente summarizing both the material and spiritual status at each of the settlements.

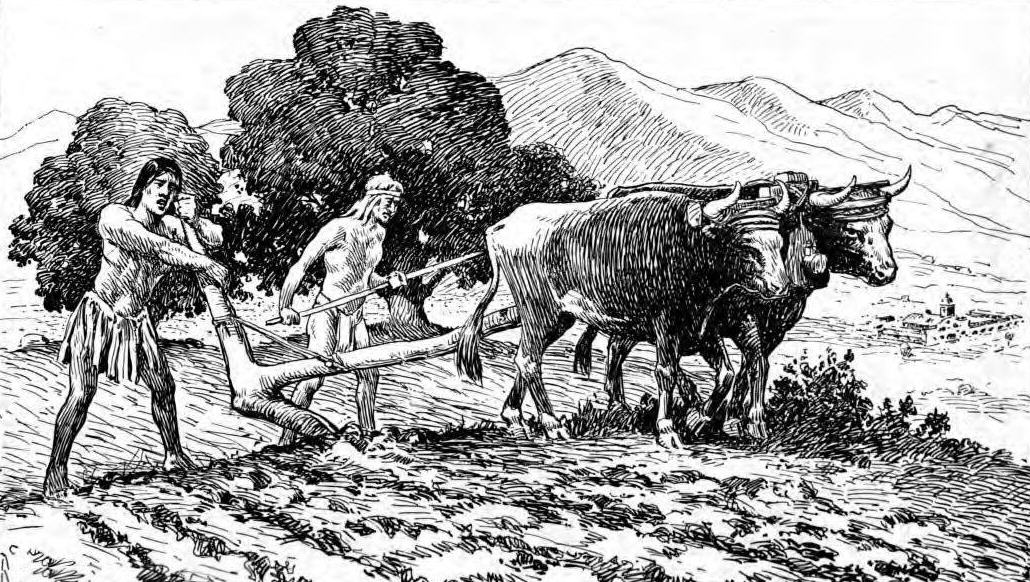
Natives using a primitive plow to prepare a field for planting near Mission San Diego de Alcalá.

Livestock was raised, not only for the purpose of obtaining meat, but also for wool, leather, and tallow, and for cultivating the land. In 1832, at the height of their prosperity, the missions collectively owned:

- 151,180 head of cattle;
- 137,969 sheep;
- 14,522 horses;
- 1,575 mules or burros;
- 1,711 goats; and
- 1,164 swine.

All these grazing animals were originally brought up from Mexico. A great many Indians were required to guard the herds and flocks on the mission ranches, which created the need for "...a class of horsemen scarcely surpassed anywhere." These animals multiplied beyond the settler's expectations, often overrunning pastures and extending well-beyond the domains of the missions. The giant herds of horses and cows took well to the climate and the extensive pastures of the Coastal California region, but at a heavy price for the California Native American people. The uncontrolled spread of these new herds, and associated invasive exotic plant species, quickly exhausted the native plants in the grasslands, and the chaparral and woodlands that the Indians depended on for their seed, foliage, and bulb harvests. The grazing-overgrazing problems were also recognized by the Spaniards, who periodically had extermination parties cull and kill thousands of excess livestock, when herd populations grew beyond their control or the land's capacity. Years with a severe drought did this also.

Mission kitchens and bakeries prepared and served thousands of meals each day. Candles, soap, grease, and ointments were all made from tallow (rendered animal fat) in large vats located just outside the west wing. Also situated in this general area were vats for dyeing wool and tanning leather, and primitive looms for weaving. Large bodegas (warehouses) provided long-term storage for preserved foodstuffs and other treated materials.

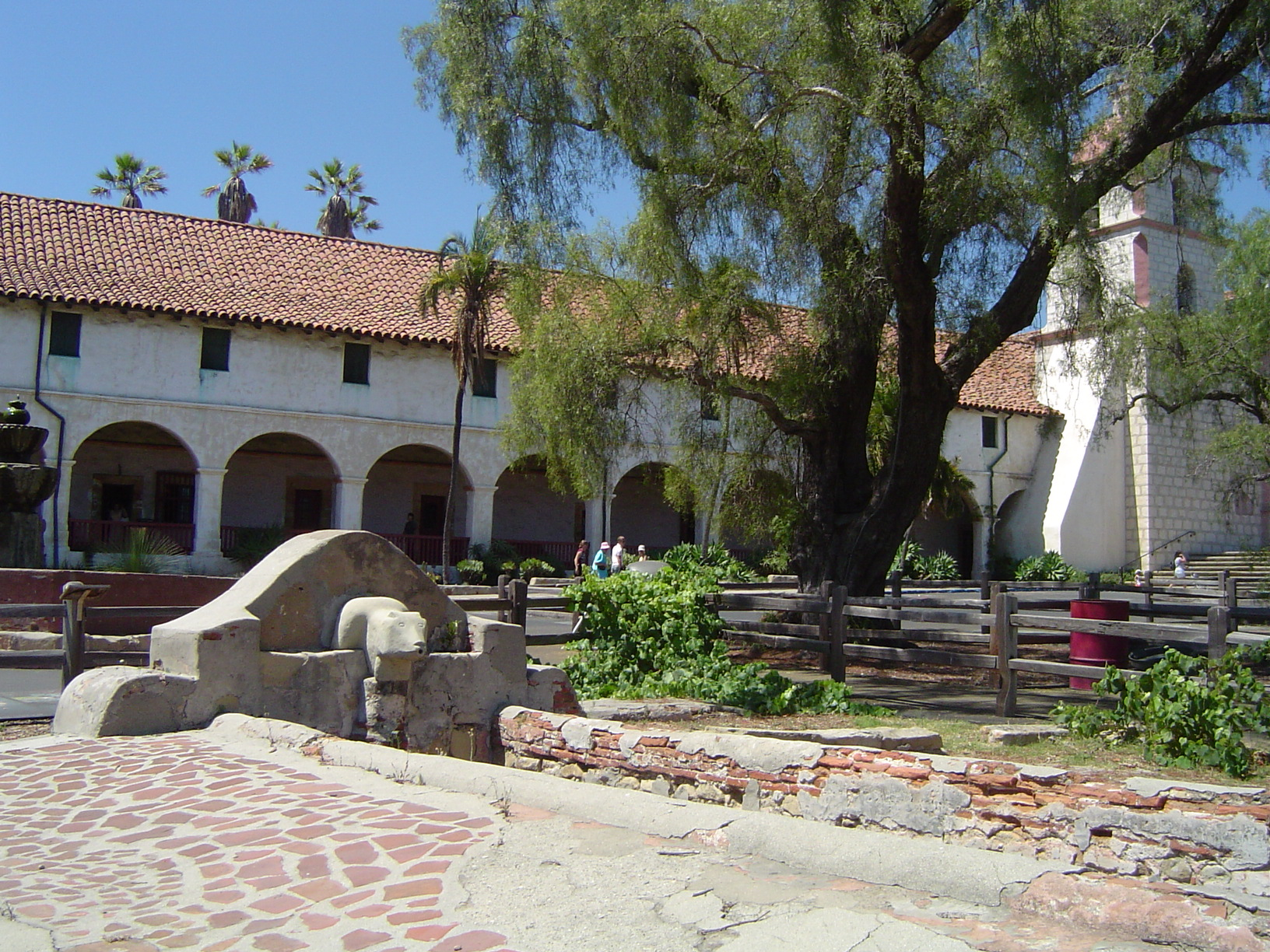
Mission Santa Barbara's lavandería was constructed by Chumash neophytes around 1806.

Each mission had to fabricate virtually all of its construction materials from local materials. Workers in the carpintería (carpentry shop) used crude methods to shape beams, lintels, and other structural elements; more skilled artisans carved doors, furniture, and wooden implements. For certain applications bricks (ladrillos) were fired in ovens (kilns) to strengthen them and make them more resistant to the elements; when tejas (roof tiles) eventually replaced the conventional jacal roofing (densely packed reeds) they were placed in the kilns to harden them as well. Glazed ceramic pots, dishes, and canisters were also made in mission kilns.

Prior to the establishment of the missions, the native peoples knew only how to use bone, seashells, stone, and wood for building, tool making, weapons, and so forth. The missionaries established manual training in European skills and methods; in agriculture, mechanical arts, and the raising and care of livestock. Everything consumed and otherwise used by the natives was produced at the missions under the supervision of the padres; thus, the neophytes not only supported themselves, but after 1811 sustained the entire military and civil government of California. The foundry at Mission San Juan Capistrano was the first to introduce the Indians to the Iron Age. The blacksmith used the mission's forges (California's first) to smelt and fashion iron into everything from basic tools and hardware (such as nails) to crosses, gates, hinges, even cannon for mission defense. Iron in particular was a commodity that the mission acquired solely through trade, as there was no mining infrastructure or industry in the region.

No study of the missions is complete without mention of their extensive water supply systems. Stone zanjas (aqueducts, sometimes spanning miles, brought fresh water from a nearby river or spring to the mission site. Open or covered lined ditches and/or baked clay pipes, joined with lime mortar or bitumen, gravity-fed the water into large cisterns and fountains, and emptied into waterways where the force of the water was used to turn grinding wheels and other simple machinery, or dispensed for use in cleaning. Water used for drinking and cooking was allowed to trickle through alternate layers of sand and charcoal to remove the impurities. One of the best-preserved mission water systems is at Mission Santa Barbara.

== History ==
Beginning in 1492 with the voyages of Christopher Columbus, the Kingdom of Spain sought to establish missions to convert indigenous people in Nueva España (New Spain), which consisted of the Caribbean, Mexico, and most of what is now the Southwestern United States) to Catholicism. This would facilitate colonization of these lands awarded to Spain by the Catholic Church, including that region later known as Alta California. (Note: The Spanish claim to the Pacific Northwest dated back to a 1493 papal bull (Inter caetera) and rights contained in the 1494 Treaty of Tordesillas; in these two formal acts, Spain gave itself the exclusive right to colonize all of the Western Hemisphere (excluding Brazil), including all of the west coast of North America.) (Note: The term Alta California as applies to the mission chain founded by Serra refers specifically to the modern-day United States State of California.) (Note: Leffingwell: The Rev. Antonio de la Ascensión, a Carmelite who visited San Diego with Vizcaíno's 1602 expedition, "surveyed the area and concluded that the land was fertile, the fish plentiful, and gold abundant." Ascensión was convinced that California's potential wealth and strategic location merited colonization, and in 1620 recommended in a letter to Madrid that missions be established in the region, a venture that would involve military as well as religious personnel.)

=== Early Spanish exploration ===
Only 48 years after Columbus discovered the Americas for Europe, Francisco Vázquez de Coronado set out from Compostela, New Spain on February 23, 1540, at the head of a large expedition. Accompanied by 400 European men-at-arms (mostly Spaniards), 1,300 to 2,000 Mexican Indian allies, several Indian and African slaves, and four Franciscan friars, he traveled from Mexico through parts of the southwestern United States to present-day Kansas between 1540 and 1542. Two years later on 27 June 1542, Juan Rodriguez Cabrillo set out from Navidad, Mexico and sailed up the coast of Baja California and into the region of Alta California.

=== Secret English claims ===
Unknown to Spain, Sir Francis Drake, an English privateer who raided Spanish treasure ships and colonial settlements, claimed the Alta California region as Nova Albion for the English Crown in 1579, a full generation before the first English landing in Jamestown in 1607. During his circumnavigation of the world, Drake anchored in a harbor just north of present-day San Francisco, California, establishing friendly relations with the Coastal Miwok and claiming the territory for Queen Elizabeth I. However, Drake sailed back to England and England (and later Britain) never pressed for any sort of claim regarding the region.

=== Russian exploration ===
However, it was not until 1741 that the Spanish monarchy of King Philip V was stimulated to consider how to protect his claims to Alta California. Philip was spurred on when the territorial ambitions of the Russian Empire were expressed in the Vitus Bering expedition along the western coast on the North American continent. (Note: Chapman: "It is usually stated that the Spanish court at Madrid received reports about Russian aggression in the Pacific northwest, and sent orders to meet them by the occupation of Alta California, wherefore the expeditions of 1769 were made. This view contains only a smattering of the truth. It is evident from [José de] Gálvez's correspondence of 1768 that he and [Carlos Francisco de] Croix had discussed the advisability of an immediate expedition to Monterey, long before any word came from Spain about the Russian activities.") (Note: Bennett: California had been visited a number of times since Cabrillo's discovery in 1542, which initially included notable expeditions led by Englishmen Francis Drake in 1579 and Thomas Cavendish 1587, and later on by Woodes Rogers (1710), George Shelvocke (1719), James Cook (1778), and finally George Vancouver in 1792. Spanish explorer Sebastián Vizcaíno made landfall in San Diego Bay in 1602, and the famed conquistador Hernán Cortés explored the California Gulf Coast in 1735.)

=== Spanish expansion ===
California represents the "high-water mark" of Spanish expansion in North America as the last and northernmost colony on the continent. The mission system arose in part from the need to control Spain's ever-expanding holdings in the New World. Realizing that the colonies required a literate population base that the mother country could not supply, the Spanish government (with the cooperation of the Church) established a network of missions to convert the indigenous population to Christianity. They aimed to make converts and tax-paying citizens of those they conquered. (Note: Bennett: "Other pioneers have blazed the way for civilization by the torch and the bullet, and the red man has disappeared before them; but it remained for the Spanish priests to undertake to preserve the Indian and seek to make his existence compatible with a higher civilization.") To make them into Spanish citizens and productive inhabitants, the Spanish government and the Church required the indigenous people to learn Spanish language and vocational skills along with Christian teachings.

Estimates for the pre-contact indigenous population in California are based on a number of different sources and vary substantially, from as few as 133,000, to 225,000, to as many as 705,000 representing more than 100 separate tribes or nations. (Note: Kroeber: "In the matter of population, too, the effect of Caucasian contact cannot be wholly slighted, since all statistics date from a late period. The disintegration of Native numbers and Native culture have proceeded hand in hand, but in very different rations according to locality. The determination of population strength before the arrival of whites is, on the other hand, of considerable significance toward the understanding of Indian culture, on account of the close relations which are manifest between type of culture and density of population.") (Note: Chapman, p. 383: "...there may have been about 133,000 [Native inhabitants] in what is now the state as a whole, and 70,000 in or near the conquered area. The missions included only the Indians of given localities, though it is true that they were situated on the best lands and in the most populous centres. Even in the vicinity of the missions, there were some unconverted groups, however." See Population of Native California.)

On January 29, 1767, Spain's King Charles III ordered the new governor Gaspar de Portolá to forcibly expel the Jesuits, who operated under the authority of the Pope and had established a chain of fifteen missions on the Baja California Peninsula. (Note: Bennett: Due to the isolation of the Baja California missions, the decree for expulsion did not arrive in June 1767, as it did in the rest of New Spain, but was delayed until the new governor, Portolà, arrived with the news on November 30. Jesuits from the operating missions gathered in Loreto, whereupon they left for exile on February 3, 1768.) Visitador General José de Gálvez engaged the Franciscans, under the leadership of Friar Junípero Serra, to take charge of those outposts on March 12, 1768. The padres closed or consolidated several of the existing settlements, and also founded Misión San Fernando Rey de España de Velicatá (the only Franciscan mission in all of Baja California) and the nearby Visita de la Presentación in 1769. This plan, however, changed within a few months after Gálvez received the following orders: "Occupy and fortify San Diego and Monterey for God and the King of Spain." The Church ordered the priests of the Dominican Order to take charge of the Baja California missions so the Franciscans could concentrate on founding new missions in Alta California.

=== Mission period (1769–1833) ===
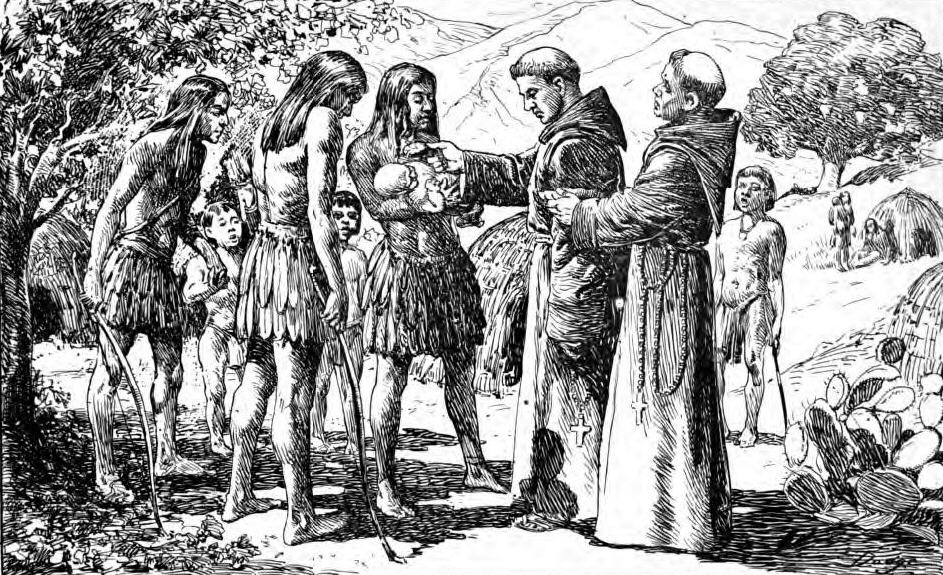
The first recorded baptisms in Alta California were performed in "The Canyon of the Little Christians".

On July 14, 1769, Gálvez sent the Portolá expedition out from Loreto to explore lands to the north. Leader Gaspar de Portolá was accompanied by a group of Franciscans led by Junípero Serra. Serra's plan was to extend the string of missions north from the Baja California peninsula, connected by an established road and spaced a day's travel apart. The first Alta California mission and presidio were founded at San Diego, the second at Monterey.

En route to Monterey, the Rev. Francisco Gómez and the Rev. Juan Crespí came across a Native settlement wherein two young girls were dying: one, a baby, said to be "dying at its mother's breast," the other a small girl suffering of burns. On July 22, Gómez baptized the baby, naming her Maria Magdalena, while Crespí baptized the older child, naming her Margarita. These were the first recorded baptisms in Alta California. Crespi dubbed the spot Los Cristianos. (Note: Engelhardt: Today, the site (located at 33°25′41.58″N 117°36′34.92″W on Marine Corps Base Camp Pendleton in San Diego County) is in Los Christianitos ("The Little Christians") Canyon, and is designated as La Christiana California Historical Landmark #562.) The group continued northward but missed Monterey Harbor and returned to San Diego on January 24, 1770. Near the end of 1769 the Portolá expedition had reached its most northerly point at present-day San Francisco. In following years, the Spanish Crown sent a number of follow-up expeditions to explore more of Alta California.

Spain also settled the California region with a number of African and mulatto Catholics, including at least ten of the recently re-discovered Los Pobladores, the founders of Los Angeles in 1781.

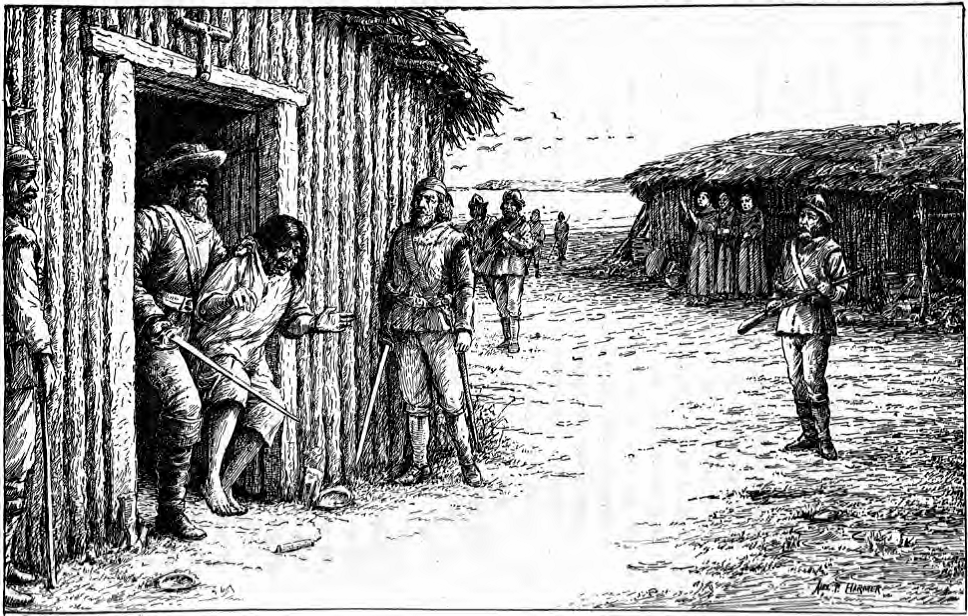
Captain Fernando Rivera y Moncada violated ecclesiastical asylum at Mission San Diego de Alcalá on March 26, 1776, when he forcibly removed a 'neophyte' in direct defiance of the padres. Missionary Pedro Font later described the scene: "...Rivera entered the chapel with drawn sword...con la espada desnuda en la mano." Rivera y Moncada was subsequently excommunicated from the Catholic Church for his actions.

== Organization ==
The original intent was for each mission to be turned over to a secular clergy and all the common mission lands distributed amongst the native population within ten years after its founding. This policy was based upon Spain's experience with the more advanced tribes in Mexico, Central America, and Peru.

In time, it became apparent to the Rev. Serra and his associates that the natives on the northern frontier in Alta California required a much longer period of acclimatization. None of the California missions ever attained complete self-sufficiency, and required continued (albeit modest) financial support from mother Spain.

=== Financial support ===
Mission development was financed out of El Fondo Piadoso de las Californias (The Pious Fund of the Californias to enable the missionaries to propagate the Catholic faith in the area then known as California. The fund originated in 1697 and consisted of voluntary donations from individuals and religious bodies in Mexico to members of the Society of Jesus.

With the onset of the Mexican War of Independence in 1810, support from the Pious Fund largely disappeared. Missions and converts were left on their own.

=== Indigenous labor ===
In 1800, native labor comprised the backbone of the colonial economy. Possibly "the worst epidemic of the Spanish Era in California" occurred between March and May 1806 when a measles epidemic and related complications killed one-quarter of the mission native population in the San Francisco Bay Area.

In 1811, the Spanish Viceroy in Mexico sent an interrogatorio (questionnaire) to all of the missions in Alta California regarding the customs, disposition, and condition of the Mission Indians. The replies varied greatly in the length, spirit, and even the value of the information provided. They were collected and prefaced by the Father-Presidente with a short general statement or abstract; the compilation was thereupon forwarded to the viceregal government. (Note: Kroeber: "Some of the missionaries evidently regarded compliance with the instructions of the questionnaire as an official requirement which was perfunctorily performed. In many cases no answers were given various questions at certain of the missions.") The contemporary nature of the responses, no matter how incomplete or biased some may be, are nonetheless of considerable value to modern ethnologists.

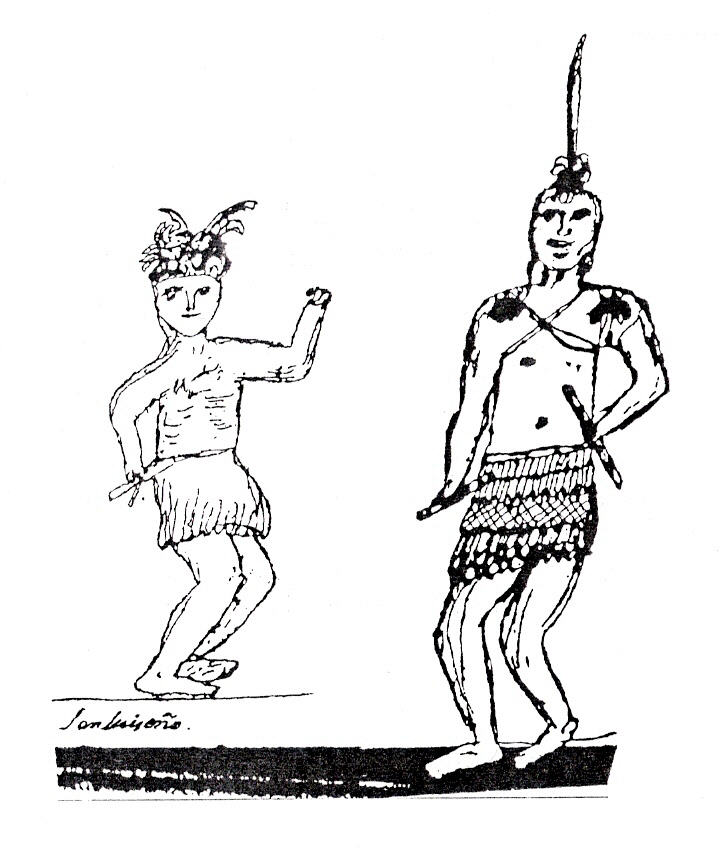
Pablo Tac, who lived at Mission San Luis Rey in the 1820s and 1830s, penned this drawing depicting two young men wearing skirts of twine and feathers with feather decorations on their heads, rattles in their hands, and (perhaps) painted decorations on their bodies.

=== Russian settlements ===
Russian colonization of the Americas extended as far south as present-day Graton, Point Arena, and Tomales Bay. Chernyk, the farming community near Graton, was about 30 miles (48 km) from present-day Sonoma, California. It had a barracks, agricultural buildings, fields of grain and vegetables, an orchard and a vineyard. Their primary location was at Fort Ross (krepost' rus), an agricultural, scientific, and fur trading settlement located on the coast. When they exterminated the sea otter and seal populations, they failed in the ambition to supply Russia's Alaskan settlements from California and left the area.

=== Pirate attacks ===
In November and December 1818, several of the missions were attacked by Hipólito Bouchard, "California's only pirate." (Note: There is a great contrast between the legacy of Bouchard in Argentina versus his reputation in the United States. In Buenos Aires, Bouchard is honored as a brave patriot, while in California he is most often remembered as a pirate, and not a privateer. See Hippolyte Bouchard.) A French privateer sailing under the flag of Argentina, Pirata Buchar (as Bouchard was known to the locals) worked his way down the California coast, conducting raids on the installations at Monterey, Santa Barbara, and San Juan Capistrano, with limited success. Upon hearing of the attacks, many mission priests (along with a few government officials) sought refuge at Mission Nuestra Señora de la Soledad, the mission chain's most isolated outpost. Ironically, Mission Santa Cruz (though ultimately ignored by the marauders) was ignominiously sacked and vandalized by local residents who were entrusted with securing the church's valuables.

=== Expansion stopped ===
By 1819, Spain decided to limit its "reach" in the New World to Northern California due to the costs involved in sustaining these remote outposts; the northernmost settlement therefore is Mission San Francisco Solano, founded in Sonoma in 1823. (Note: Hittell: "...it [Mission San Francisco Solano] was quite frequently known as the mission of Sonoma. From the beginning it was rather a military than a religious establishment—a sort of outpost or barrier, first against the Russians and afterwards against the Americans; but still a large adobe church was built and Indians were baptized.")

An attempt to found a twenty-second mission in Santa Rosa in 1827 was aborted. (Note: Hittell: "By that time, it was found that the Russians were not such undesirable neighbors as in 1817 it was thought they might become...the Russian scare, for the time being at least was over; and as for the old enthusiasm for new spiritual conquests, there was none left.") (Note: Bennett 1897b, p. 154: "Up to 1817 the 'spiritual conquest' of California had been confined to the territory south of San Francisco Bay. And this, it might be said, was as far as possible under the mission system. There had been a few years prior to that time certain alarming incursions of the Russians, which distressed Spain, and it was ordered that missions be started across the bay.") (Note: Chapman: "...the Russians and the English were by no means the only foreign peoples who threatened Spain's domination of the Pacific coast. The Indians and the Chinese had their opportunity before Spain appeared upon the scene. The Japanese were at one time a potential concern, and the Portuguese and Dutch voyagers occasionally gave Spain concern. The French for many years were the most dangerous enemy of all, but with their disappearance from North America in 1763, as a result of their defeat in the Seven Years' War, they were no longer a menace. The people of the United States were eventually to become the most powerful outstanding element.") In 1833, the final group of missionaries arrived in Alta California. These were Mexican-born (rather than Spaniards), and had been trained at the Apostolic College of Our Lady of Guadalupe in Zacatecas. Among these friars was Francisco García Diego y Moreno, who would become the first bishop of the Diocese of Both Californias. These friars would bear the brunt of the changes brought on by secularization and the U.S. occupation, and many would be marked by allegations of corruption.

=== Chumash revolt ===
The Chumash people revolted against the Spanish presence in 1824. The Chumash planned a coordinated rebellion at three missions. Due to an incident with a soldier at Mission Santa Inés, the rebellion began on Saturday, February 21. The Chumash withdrew from Mission Santa Inés upon the arrival of military reinforcements, then attacked Mission La Purisima from inside, forced the garrison to surrender, and allowed the garrison, their families, and the mission priest to depart for Santa Inés. The next day, the Chumash of Mission Santa Barbara captured the mission from within without bloodshed, repelled a military attack on the mission, and then retreated from the mission to the hills. The Chumash continued to occupy Mission La Purisima until a Mexican military unit attacked people on March 16 and forced them to surrender. Two military expeditions were sent after the Chumash in the hills; the first did not find them and the second negotiated with the Chumash and convinced a majority to return to the missions by June 28.

=== Secularization ===
As the Mexican republic matured, calls for the secularization ("disestablishment") of the missions increased. They were finally closed down in 1834, their priests mostly returned to Mexico. The churches ended religious services and fell into disrepair. The farmlands were seized. (Note: Robinson: The cortes (legislature) of New Spain issued a decree in 1813 for at least partial secularization that affected all missions in America and was to apply to all outposts that had operated for ten years or more; however, the decree was never enforced in California.)

José María de Echeandía, the first native Mexican elected Governor of Alta California issued a "Proclamation of Emancipation" (or "Prevenciónes de Emancipacion") on July 25, 1826. All Indians within the military districts of San Diego, Santa Barbara, and Monterey who were found qualified were freed from missionary rule and made eligible to become Mexican citizens. Those who wished to remain under mission tutelage were exempted from most forms of corporal punishment. (Note: Catholic historian Zephyrin Engelhardt referred to Echeandía as "...an avowed enemy of the religious orders.") By 1830, even the neophyte populations themselves appeared confident in their own abilities to operate the mission ranches and farms independently; the padres, however, doubted the capabilities of their charges in this regard.

Accelerating immigration, both Mexican and foreign, increased pressure on the Alta California government to seize the mission properties and dispossess the natives in accordance with Echeandía's directive. (Note: Settlers made numerous false claims to diminish the natives' abilities: "The Indians are by nature slovenly and indolent," stated one newcomer. "They have unfeelingly appropriated the region," claimed another.) Despite the fact that Echeandía's emancipation plan was met with little encouragement from the novices who populated the southern missions, he was nonetheless determined to test the scheme on a large scale at Mission San Juan Capistrano. To that end, he appointed a number of comisionados (commissioners) to oversee the emancipation of the Indians. The Mexican government passed legislation on December 20, 1827, that mandated the expulsion of all Spaniards younger than sixty years of age from Mexican territories; Governor Echeandía nevertheless intervened on behalf of some of the missionaries to prevent their deportation once the law took effect in California.

Upon arriving in Monterey, California in April 1832, Thomas O. Larkin found the economics of land and commerce were controlled by the Spanish missions, presidios, pueblos, and a few ranchos.

The lands of each mission joined those of other missions on either side, so that all were connected, or, in other words, the missionaries occupied all the land along the coast, except the presidios, the three pueblos and their lands, and a few ranchos which were held by virtue of grants from the King of Spain.... The missionaries objected to any settlements in the country but the missions; the presidios they regarded as a necessary evil.

Governor José Figueroa (who took office in 1833) initially attempted to keep the mission system intact, but the Mexican Congress passed An Act for the Secularization of the Missions of California on August 17, 1833, when liberal Valentín Gómez Farías was in office. (Note: Yenne: In 1833, Figueroa replaced the Spanish-born Franciscan padres at all of the settlements north of Mission San Antonio de Padua with Mexican-born Franciscan priests from the College of Guadalupe de Zacatecas. In response, Father-Presidente Narciso Durán transferred the headquarters of the Alta California Mission System to Mission Santa Bárbara, where it remained until 1846.)

The Act also provided for the colonization of both Alta and Baja California, the expenses of this latter move to be borne by the proceeds gained from the sale of the mission property to private interests.

For instance, after Mexican independence, the Mexican government confiscated Franciscan lands and decommissioned them. This, however, did not see the end of Native plight since further dislocation and abuse occurred under Mexican control. Most of the confiscated Franciscan lands were given out as grants to white settlers or well connected Mexicans, while Native Californians continued to occupy the land as a labor force.

Mission San Juan Capistrano was the very first to feel the effects of secularization when, on August 9, 1834, Governor Figueroa issued his "Decree of Confiscation". Nine other settlements quickly followed, with six more in 1835; San Buenaventura and San Francisco de Asís were among the last to succumb, in June and December 1836, respectively. The Franciscans soon thereafter abandoned most of the missions, taking with them almost everything of value, after which the locals typically plundered the mission buildings for construction materials. Former mission pasture lands were divided into large land grants called ranchos, greatly increasing the number of private land holdings in Alta California.

=== Rancho period (1834–1849) ===
The Indian towns at San Juan Capistrano, San Dieguito, and Las Flores continued for some time under a provision in Gobernador Echeandía's 1826 Proclamation that allowed for the partial conversion of missions to pueblos.

According to one estimate, the native population in and around the missions proper was approximately 80,000 at the time of the confiscation; others claim that the statewide population had dwindled to approximately 100,000 by the early 1840s, due in no small part to the natives' exposure to European diseases, and from the Franciscan practice of cloistering women in the convento and controlling sexuality during the child-bearing age. (Baja California Territory experienced a similar reduction in native population resulting from Spanish colonization efforts there).

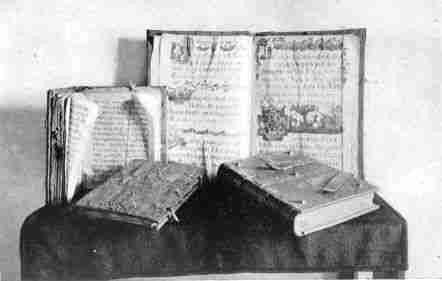
Illuminated choir missals on display at Mission San Luis Rey de Francia in 1913.

Pío de Jesús Pico, the last Mexican Governor of Alta California, found upon taking office that there were few funds available to carry on the affairs of the province. He prevailed upon the assembly to pass a decree authorizing the renting or the sale of all mission property, reserving only the church, a curate's house, and a building for a courthouse. The expenses of conducting the services of the church were to be provided from the proceeds, but there was no disposition made as to what should be done to secure the funds for that purpose.

After secularization, Father-Presidente Narciso Durán transferred the missions' headquarters to Santa Bárbara, thereby making Mission Santa Bárbara the repository of some 3,000 original documents that had been scattered through the California missions. The Mission archive is the oldest library in the State of California that still remains in the hands of its founders, the Franciscans (it is the only mission where they have maintained an uninterrupted presence). Beginning with the writings of Hubert Howe Bancroft, the library has served as a center for historical study of the missions for more than a century. In 1895, journalist and historian Charles Fletcher Lummis criticized the Act and its results, saying:

Disestablishment—a polite term for robbery—by Mexico (rather than by native Californians misrepresenting the Mexican government) in 1834, was the death blow of the mission system. The lands were confiscated; the buildings were sold for beggarly sums, and often for beggarly purposes. The Indian converts were scattered and starved out; the noble buildings were pillaged for their tiles and adobes...

=== California statehood (1850 and beyond) ===
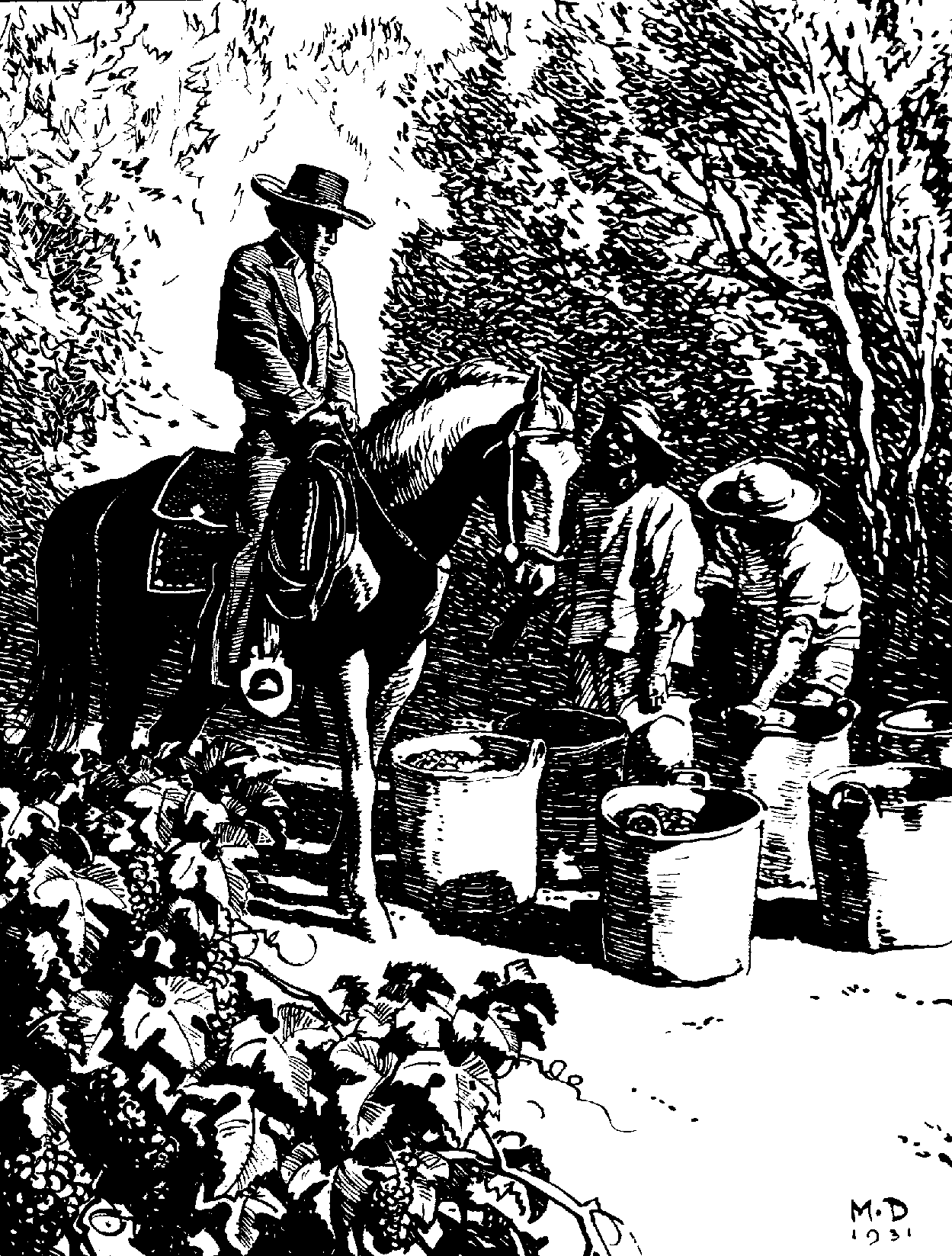
Hugo Reid, an outspoken critic of the mission system and its effects on the native populations, at Rancho Santa Anita circa 1850.

Precise figures relating to the population decline of California indigenes are not available. One writer, Gregory Orfalea, estimates that pre-contact population was reduced by 33 percent during Spanish and Mexican rule, mostly through introduction of European diseases, but much more after the United States takeover in 1848. By 1870, the loss of indigenous lives had become catastrophic. Up to 80 percent died, leaving a population of about 30,000 in 1870. Orfalea claims that nearly half of the native deaths after 1848 were murder.

In 1837–38, a major smallpox epidemic devastated native tribes north of San Francisco Bay, in the jurisdiction of Mission San Francisco Solano. General Mariano Vallejo estimated that 70,000 died from the disease. Vallejo's ally, chief Sem-Yeto, was one of the few natives to be vaccinated, and one of the few to survive.

When the mission properties were secularized between 1834 and 1838, the approximately 15,000 resident neophytes lost whatever protection the mission system afforded them. While under the secularization laws the natives were to receive up to one-half of the mission properties, this never happened. The natives lost whatever stock and movable property they may have accumulated. When California became a U.S. state, California law stripped them of legal title to the land. In the Act of September 30, 1850, Congress appropriated funds to allow the President to appoint three Commissioners, O. M. Wozencraft, Redick McKee and George W. Barbour, to study the California situation and "...negotiate treaties with the various Indian tribes of California." Treaty negotiations ensued during the period between March 19, 1851, and January 7, 1852, during which the Commission interacted with 402 Indian chiefs and headmen (representing approximately one-third to one-half of the California tribes) and entered into eighteen treaties.

California Senator William M. Gwin's Act of March 3, 1851 created the Public Land Commission, whose purpose was to determine the validity of Spanish and Mexican land grants in California. On February 19, 1853 Archbishop Joseph Sadoc Alemany filed petitions for the return of all former mission lands in the state. Ownership of 1,051.44 acres (4.2550 km^{2}) (essentially exact area of land occupied by the original mission buildings, cemeteries, and gardens) was subsequently conveyed to the Church, along with the Cañada de los Pinos (or College Rancho) in Santa Barbara County comprising 35,499.73 acres (143.6623 km^{2}), and La Laguna in San Luis Obispo County, consisting of 4,157.02 acres (16.8229 km^{2}). As the result of a U.S. government investigation in 1873, a number of Indian reservations were assigned by executive proclamation in 1875. The commissioner of Indian affairs reported in 1879 that the number of Mission Indians in the state was down to around 3,000.

=== Legacy and Native American controversy ===
Some modern anthropologists cite a cultural bias on the part of the missionaries that blinded them to the natives' plight and caused them to develop strong negative opinions of the California Indians. (Note: Hittell: "Boscana himself and his brother missionaries were men of narrow range of thought, continually seeking among the superstitions of the natives for resemblances of the true faith and ever ready to catch at the slightest hints and magnify them into complicated dogmas corresponding afar of those which they themselves taught.")

The mission project was a popular teaching tool used in California to teach school children about the Spanish missions, but became controversial. Its popularity began decreasing in the mid-2010s as educators questioned whether the assignment effectively teaches students about the Spanish missions' impact on indigenous Californians.

European diseases like influenza, measles, tuberculosis, gonorrhea, and dysentery killed a significant number of natives as a result of their contact with the Europeans, as the California Native Americans had no immunity to these diseases. Miners and settlers contributed to the high death rate.

Between 1846 and 1870, California's Indian population plunged from perhaps 150,000 to 30,000. Diseases, dislocation, and starvation caused many of these deaths. However, abduction, unfree labor, mass death on reservations, individual homicides, battles, and massacres also took thousands of lives and hindered reproduction.

The close relationship between church and government found in the original California mission system was a foundation for later forms of government. The early missions and their sub-missions formed the nuclei of what would later become the major metropolitan areas of San Francisco and Los Angeles, as well as many other smaller municipalities.

By eliminating the native population, the Spanish, Mexican, and later American settlers could take over the land without opposition. The early Spanish mission system established the basis for the cattle and agriculture economies that flourish in the state today.

== Mission administration ==
The "Father-Presidente" was the head of the Catholic missions in Alta and Baja California.

=== System Father-Presidentes ===
- The Rev. Junípero Serra (1769–1784)
- The Rev. Francisco Palóu (presidente pro tempore) (1784–1785)
- The Rev. Fermín Francisco de Lasuén (1785–1803)
- The Rev. Pedro Estévan Tápis (1803–1812)
- The Rev. José Francisco de Paula Señan (1812–1815)
- The Rev. Mariano Payéras (1815–1820)
- The Rev. José Francisco de Paula Señan (1820–1823)
- The Rev. Vicente Francisco de Sarría (1823–1824)
- The Rev. Narciso Durán (1824–1827)
- The Rev. José Bernardo Sánchez (1827–1831)
- The Rev. Narciso Durán (1831–1838)
- The Rev. José Joaquin Jimeno (1838–1844)
- The Rev. Narciso Durán (1844–1846)

He was appointed by the College of San Fernando de Mexico until 1812. Then the position became known as the "Commissary Prefect" who was appointed by the Commissary General of the Indies, a Franciscan residing in Spain. Beginning in 1831, separate individuals were elected to oversee Upper and Lower California.

=== Mission headquarters ===
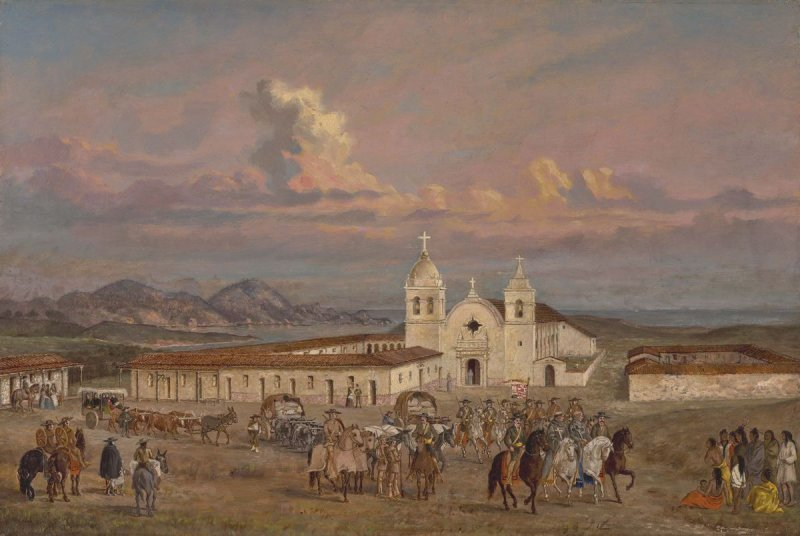
Mission San Carlos Borromeo de Carmelo, established in 1770, was the headquarters of the Californian mission system from 1797 until 1833.

- Mission San Diego de Alcalá (1769–1771)
- Mission San Carlos Borromeo de Carmelo (1771–1815)
- Mission La Purísima Concepción*(1815–1819)
- Mission San Carlos Borromeo de Carmelo (1819–1824)
- Mission San José*(1824–1827)
- Mission San Carlos Borromeo de Carmelo (1827–1830)
- Mission San José*(1830–1833)
- Mission Santa Barbara (1833–1846)

† The Rev. Payeras and the Rev. Durán remained at their resident missions during their terms as Father-Presidente, therefore those settlements became the de facto headquarters (until 1833, when all mission records were permanently relocated to Santa Barbara). (Note: In 1833 Figueroa replaced the padres at all of the settlements north of Mission San Antonio de Padua with Mexican-born Franciscan priests from the College of Guadalupe de Zacatecas. In response, Father-Presidente Narciso Durán transferred the headquarters of the Alta California Mission System to Mission Santa Bárbara, where they remained until 1846.)

=== Mission locations ===
There were 21 missions accompanied by military outposts in Alta California from San Diego to Sonoma, California. To facilitate travel between them on horse and foot, the mission settlements were situated approximately 30 miles (48 kilometers) apart, about one day's journey on horseback, or three days on foot. The entire trail eventually became a 600-mile (966-kilometer) long "California Mission Trail". Heavy freight movement was practical only via water. Tradition has it that the padres sprinkled mustard seeds along the trail to mark it with bright yellow flowers.

Following the old Camino Real northwards, from San Diego through to the northernmost mission in Sonoma, California, north of San Francisco Bay, the missions were:

No.	Name	Named for	Location	Date founded
1	Mission San Diego de Alcalá	St. Didacus of Alcalá	San Diego	July 16, 1769
2	Mission San Luis Rey de Francia	St. Louis, King of France	Oceanside	June 12, 1798
3	Mission San Juan Capistrano	St. John of Capistrano	San Juan Capistrano	November 1, 1776
4	Mission San Gabriel Arcángel	The Archangel Gabriel	San Gabriel	September 8, 1771
5	Mission San Fernando Rey de España	St. Ferdinand, King of Spain	Los Angeles	September 8, 1797
6	Mission San Buenaventura	St. Bonaventure	Ventura	March 31, 1782
7	Mission Santa Barbara	St. Barbara	Santa Barbara	December 4, 1786
8	Mission Santa Inés	St. Agnes	Solvang	September 17, 1804
9	Mission La Purísima Concepción	The Immaculate Conception	Southeast of Lompoc	December 8, 1787
10	Mission San Luis Obispo de Tolosa	St. Louis of Toulouse	San Luis Obispo	September 1, 1772
11	Mission San Miguel Arcángel	The Archangel Michael	San Miguel	July 25, 1797
12	Mission San Antonio de Padua	St. Anthony of Padua	Northwest of Jolon	July 14, 1771
13	Mission Nuestra Señora de la Soledad	Mary, Our Lady of Solitude	South of Soledad	October 9, 1791
14	Mission San Carlos Borromeo de Carmelo	St. Charles Borromeo	Carmel	June 3, 1770
15	Mission San Juan Bautista	St. John the Baptist	San Juan Bautista	June 24, 1797
16	Mission Santa Cruz	The Exaltation of the Holy Cross	Santa Cruz	August 28, 1791
17	Mission Santa Clara de Asís	St. Clare of Assisi	Santa Clara	January 12, 1777
18	Mission San José	St. Joseph	Fremont	June 11, 1797
19	Mission San Francisco de Asís	St. Francis of Assisi	San Francisco	October 9, 1776
20	Mission San Rafael Arcángel	The Archangel Raphael	San Rafael	December 14, 1817
21	Mission San Francisco Solano	St. Francis Solanus	Sonoma	April 4, 1824

== Presidios and military districts ==
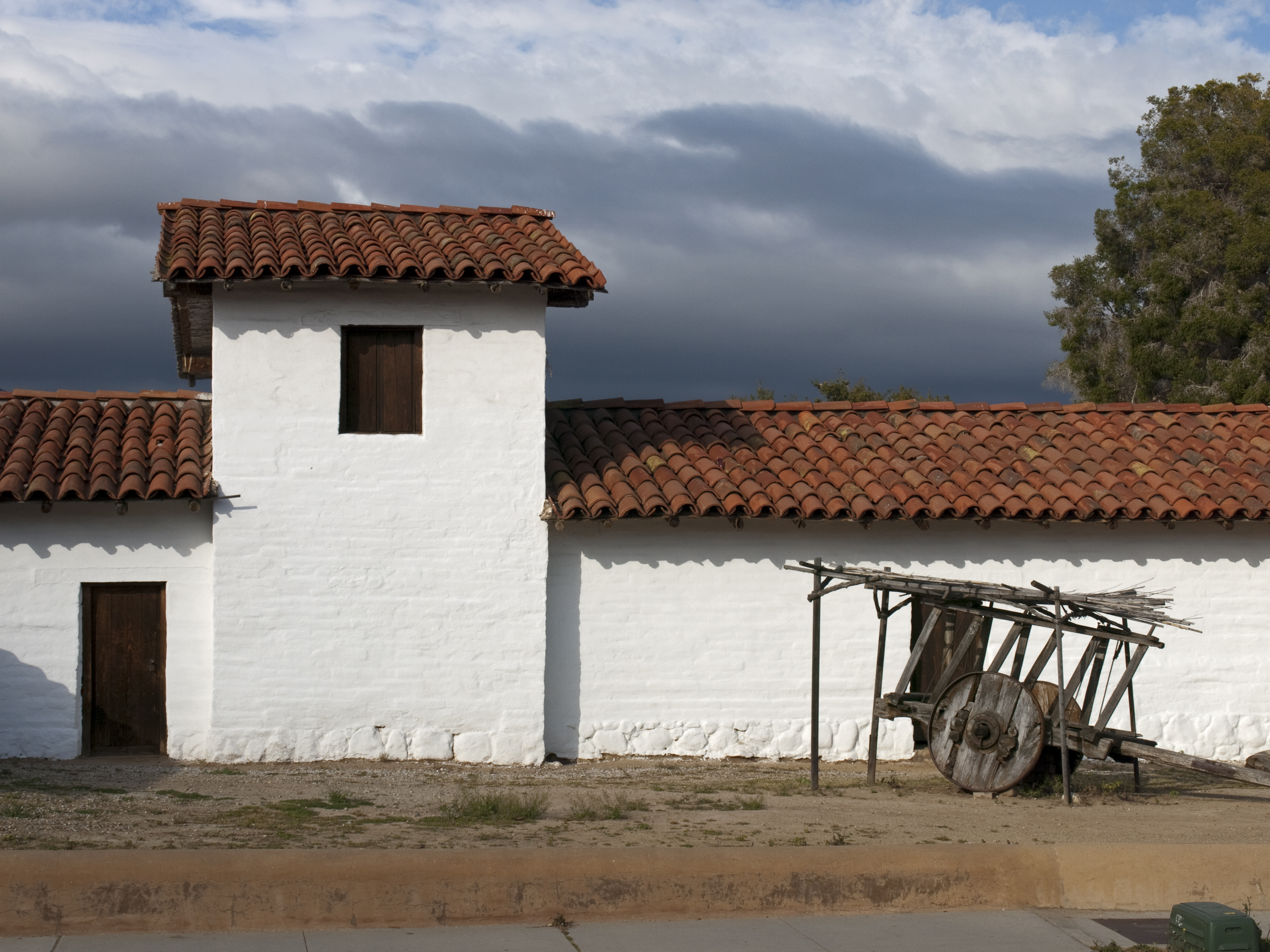
El Presidio Real de Santa Bárbara

During the Mission Period Alta California was divided into four military districts. Each was garrisoned (comandancias) by a presidio strategically placed along the California coast to protect the missions and other Spanish settlements in Upper California. Each of these functioned as a base of military operations for a specific region. They were independent of one another and were organized from south to north as follows:

- El Presidio Real de San Diego founded on July 16, 1769 – responsible for the defense of all installations located within the First Military District (the missions at San Diego, San Luis Rey, San Juan Capistrano, and San Gabriel);
- El Presidio Real de Santa Bárbara founded on April 12, 1782 – responsible for the defense of all installations located within the Second Military District (the missions at San Fernando, San Buenaventura, Santa Barbara, Santa Inés, and La Purísima, along with El Pueblo de Nuestra Señora la Reina de los Ángeles del Río de Porciúncula [Los Angeles]);
- El Presidio Real de San Carlos de Monterey (El Castillo) founded on June 3, 1770 – responsible for the defense of all installations located within the Third Military District (the missions at San Luis Obispo, San Miguel, San Antonio, Soledad, San Carlos, and San Juan Bautista, along with Villa Branciforte [Santa Cruz]); and
- El Presidio Real de San Francisco founded on December 17, 1776 – responsible for the defense of all installations located within the Fourth Military District (the missions at Santa Cruz, San José, Santa Clara, San Francisco, San Rafael, and Solano, along with El Pueblo de San José de Guadalupe [San Jose]).
- El Presidio de Sonoma, or "Sonoma Barracks" (a collection of guardhouses, storerooms, living quarters, and an observation tower) was established in 1836 by Mariano Guadalupe Vallejo (the "Commandante-General of the Northern Frontier of Alta California") as a part of Mexico's strategy to halt Russian incursions into the region. The Sonoma Presidio became the new headquarters of the Mexican Army in California, while the remaining presidios were essentially abandoned and, in time, fell into ruins.

An ongoing power struggle between church and state grew increasingly heated and lasted for decades. Originating as a feud between the Rev. Serra and Pedro Fages (the military governor of Alta California from 1770 to 1774, who regarded the Spanish installations in California as military institutions first and religious outposts second), the uneasy relationship persisted for more than sixty years. (Note: Bennett: "...Junípero had in California insisted that the military should be subservient to the priests, that the conquest was spiritual, not temporal...") Dependent upon one another for their very survival, military leaders and mission padres nevertheless adopted conflicting stances regarding everything from land rights, the allocation of supplies, protection of the missions, the criminal propensities of the soldiers, and (in particular) the status of the native populations. (Note: Engelhardt: "Recruited from the scum of society in Mexico, frequently convicts and jailbirds, it is not surprising that the mission guards, leather-jacket soldiers, as they were called, should be guilty of...crimes at nearly all the Missions...In truth, the guards counted among the worst obstacles to missionary progress. The wonder is, that the missionaries nevertheless succeeded so well in attracting converts.")

== Present-day California missions ==
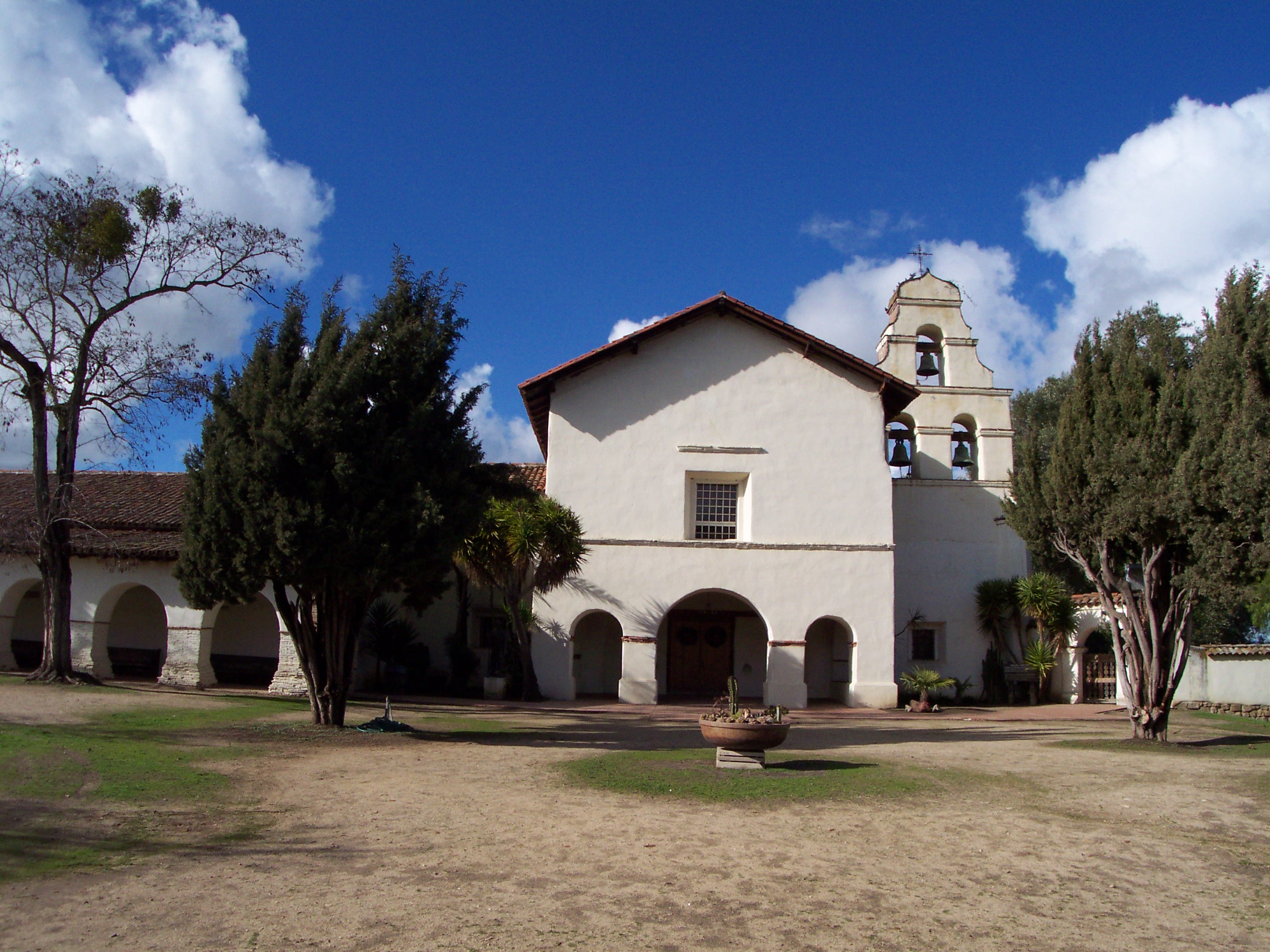
A view of the restored Mission San Juan Bautista and its three-bell campanario ("bell wall") in 2004.

=== Building restoration ===
California is home to the biggest number of well-preserved missions found in any U.S. state. (Note: Morrison: That the buildings in the California mission chain are in large part intact is due in no small measure to their relatively recent construction; Mission San Diego de Alcalá was founded more than two centuries after the establishment of the Mission of Nombre de Dios in St. Augustine, Florida in 1565 and 170 years following the founding of Mission San Gabriel del Yunque in present-day Santa Fe, New Mexico in 1598.) The missions are collectively the best-known historic element of the coastal regions of California:

- Most of the missions are still owned and operated by some entity within the Catholic Church.
- Three of the missions are still run under the auspices of the Franciscan Order (Santa Barbara, San Miguel Arcángel, and San Luis Rey de Francia)
- Four of the missions (San Diego de Alcalá, San Carlos Borromeo de Carmelo, San Francisco de Asís, and San Juan Capistrano) have been designated minor basilicas by the Holy See due to their cultural, historic, architectural, and religious importance.
- Mission La Purísima Concepción, Mission San Francisco Solano, and the one remaining mission-era structure of Mission Santa Cruz are owned and operated by the California Department of Parks and Recreation as State Historic Parks;
- Seven mission sites are designated National Historic Landmarks, fourteen are listed in the National Register of Historic Places, and all are designated as California Historical Landmarks for their historic, architectural, and archaeological significance.

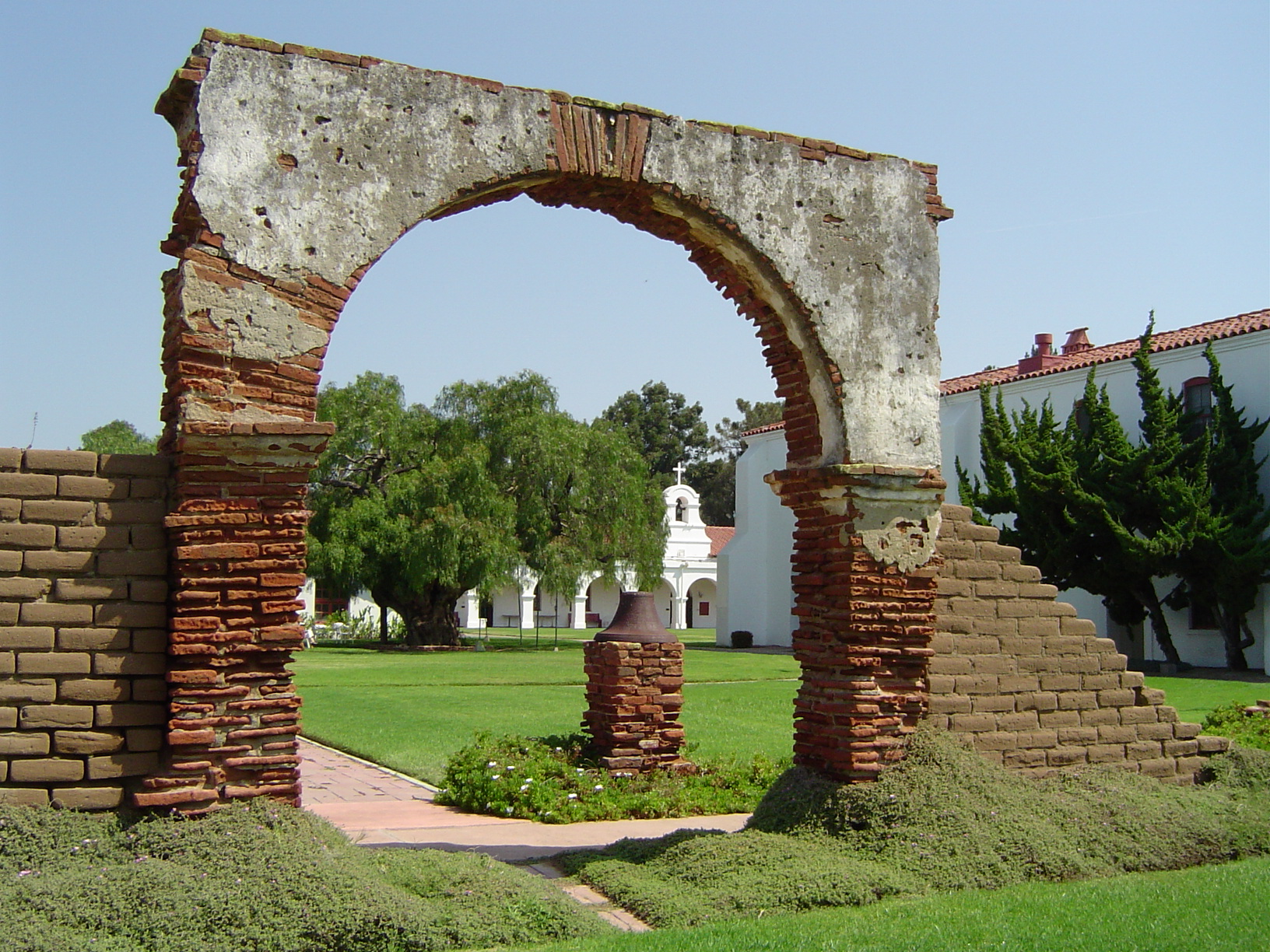
The courtyard of Mission San Luis Rey de Francia, with California's oldest pepper tree (Schinus molle), planted in 1830, visible through the arch.

Because virtually all of the artwork at the missions served either a devotional or didactic purpose, there was no underlying reason for the mission residents to record their surroundings graphically; visitors, however, found them to be objects of curiosity. During the 1850s a number of artists found gainful employment as draftsmen attached to expeditions sent to map the Pacific coastline and the border between California and Mexico (as well as plot practical railroad routes); many of the drawings were reproduced as lithographs in the expedition reports.

In 1875 American illustrator Henry Chapman Ford began visiting each of the twenty-one mission sites, where he created a historically important portfolio of watercolors, oils, and etchings. His depictions of the missions were (in part) responsible for the revival of interest in the state's Spanish heritage, and indirectly for the restoration of the missions. The 1880s saw the appearance of a number of articles on the missions in national publications and the first books on the subject; as a result, a large number of artists did one or more mission paintings, though few attempted a series.

The popularity of the missions also stemmed largely from Helen Hunt Jackson's 1884 novel Ramona and the subsequent efforts of Charles Fletcher Lummis, William Randolph Hearst, and other members of the "Landmarks Club of Southern California" to restore three of the southern missions in the early 20th century (San Juan Capistrano, San Diego de Alcalá, and San Fernando; the Pala Asistencia was also restored by this effort). (Note: Thompson: In the words of Charles Lummis, the historic structures "...were falling to ruin with frightful rapidity, their roofs being breached or gone, the adobe walls melting under the winter rains.") Lummis wrote in 1895,

In ten years from now—unless our intelligence shall awaken at once—there will remain of these noble piles nothing but a few indeterminable heaps of adobe. We shall deserve and shall have the contempt of all thoughtful people if we suffer our noble missions to fall.

In acknowledgement of the magnitude of the restoration efforts required and the urgent need to have acted quickly to prevent further or even total degradation, Lummis went on to state,

It is no exaggeration to say that human power could not have restored these four missions had there been a five-year delay in the attempt.

In 1911 author John Steven McGroarty penned The Mission Play, a three-hour pageant describing the California missions from their founding in 1769 through secularization in 1834, and ending with their "final ruin" in 1847.

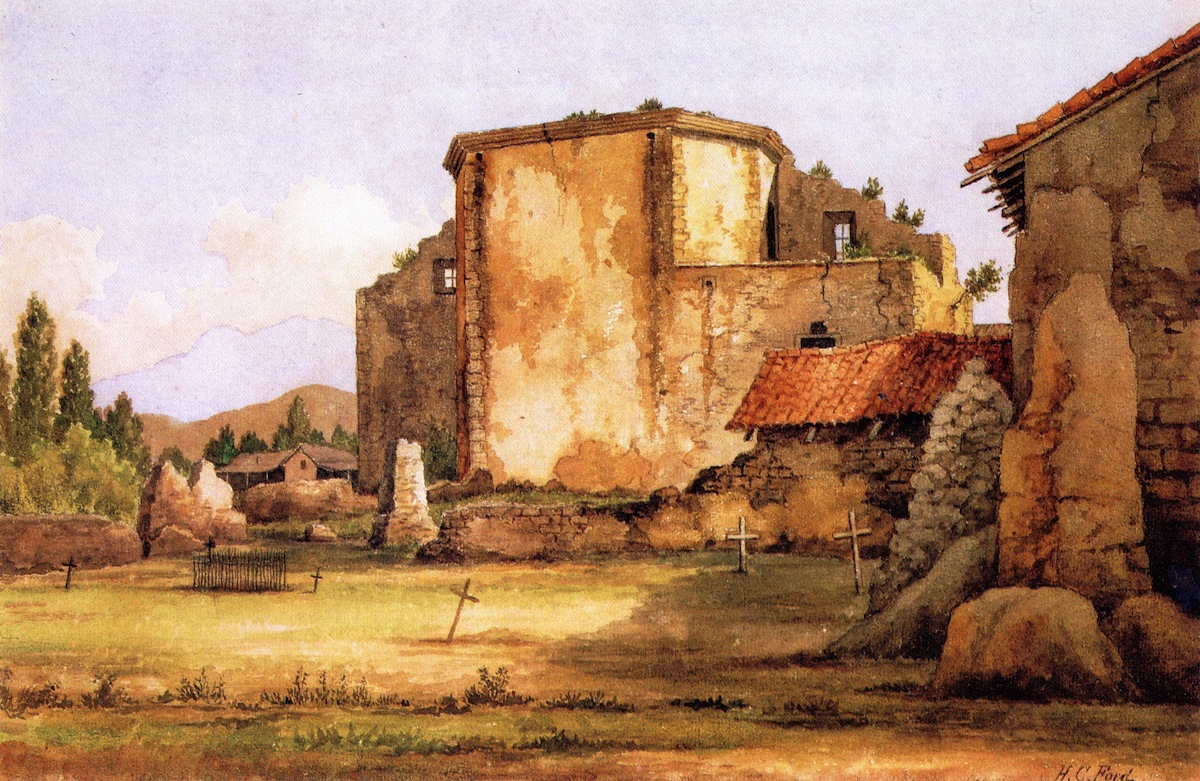
Misión San Juan de Capistrano by Henry Chapman Ford, 1880. The work depicts the rear of the "Great Stone Church" and part of the mission's campo santo.

Today, the missions exist in varying degrees of architectural integrity and structural soundness. The most common extant features at the mission grounds include the church building and an ancillary convento (convent) wing. In some cases (in San Rafael, Santa Cruz, and Soledad, for example), the current buildings are replicas constructed on or near the original site. Other mission compounds remain relatively intact and true to their original, Mission Era construction.

A notable example of an intact complex is the now-threatened Mission San Miguel Arcángel: its chapel retains the original interior murals created by Salinan Indians under the direction of Esteban Munras, a Spanish artist and last Spanish diplomat to California. This structure was closed to the public from 2003 to 2009 due to severe damage from the San Simeon earthquake. Many missions have preserved (or in some cases reconstructed) historic features in addition to chapel buildings.

The missions have earned a prominent place in California's historic consciousness, and a steady stream of tourists from all over the world visit them. In recognition of that fact, on November 30, 2004, President George W. Bush signed HR 1446, the California Mission Preservation Act, into law. The measure provided $10 million over a five-year period to the California Missions Foundation for projects related to the physical preservation of the missions, including structural rehabilitation, stabilization, and conservation of mission art and artifacts. The California Missions Foundation, a volunteer, tax-exempt organization, was founded in 1998 by Richard Ameil, an eighth generation Californian. A change to the California Constitution has also been proposed that would allow the use of State funds in restoration efforts.

== Structures gallery ==
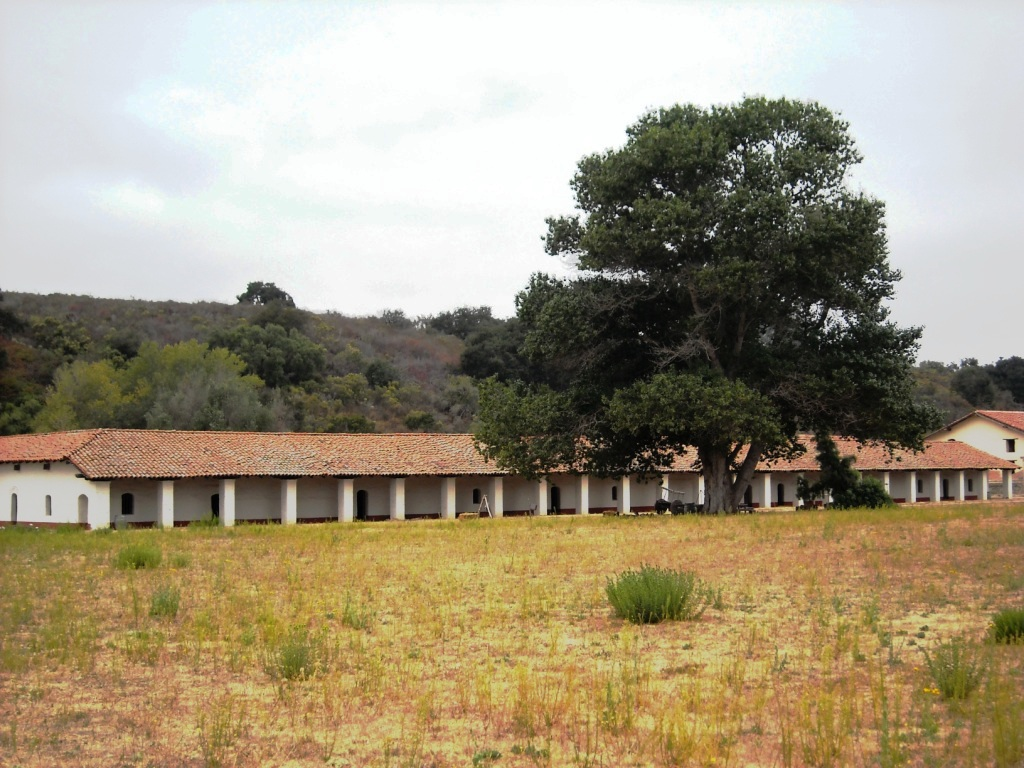
Mission La Purísima Concepción, located northeast of Lompoc.

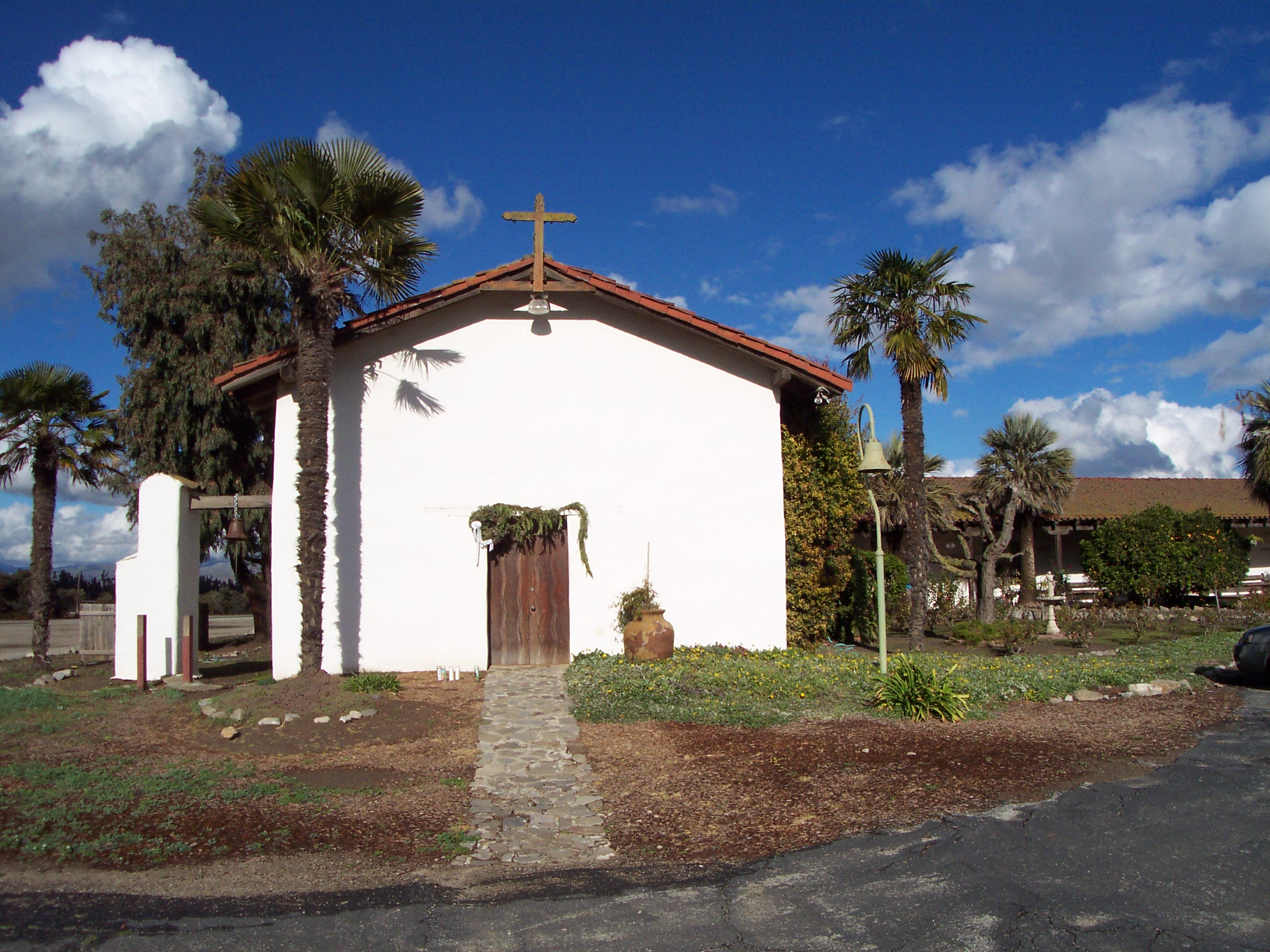
Mission Nuestra Señora de la Soledad, located south of Soledad.

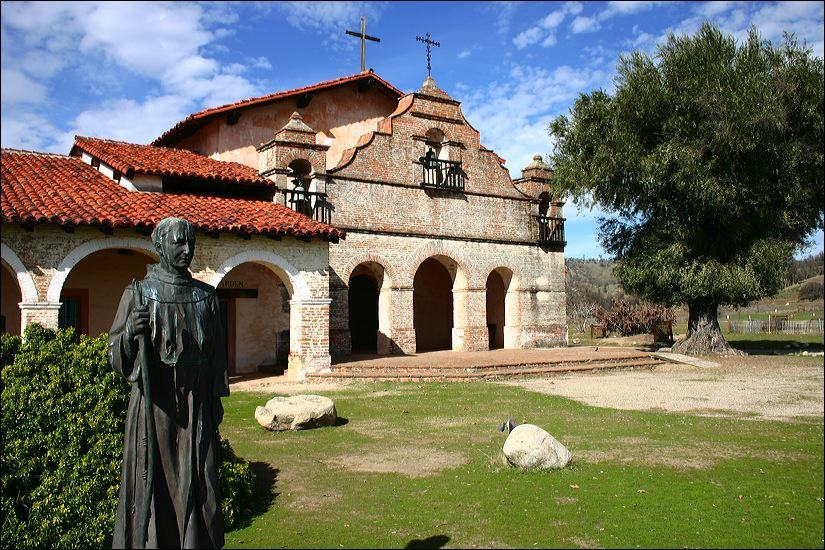
Mission San Antonio de Padua, located northwest of Jolon.

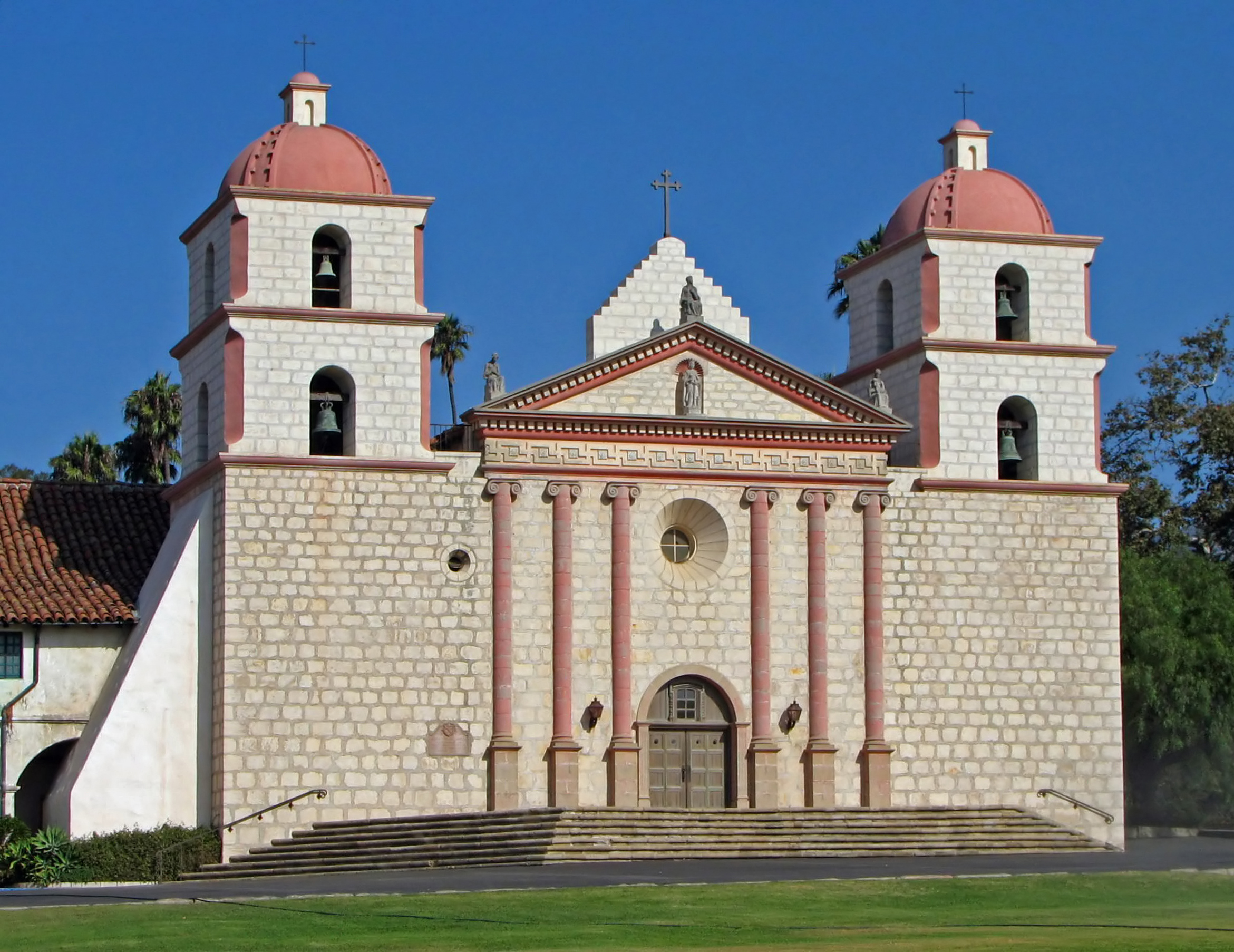
Mission Santa Barbara, located in Santa Barbara.

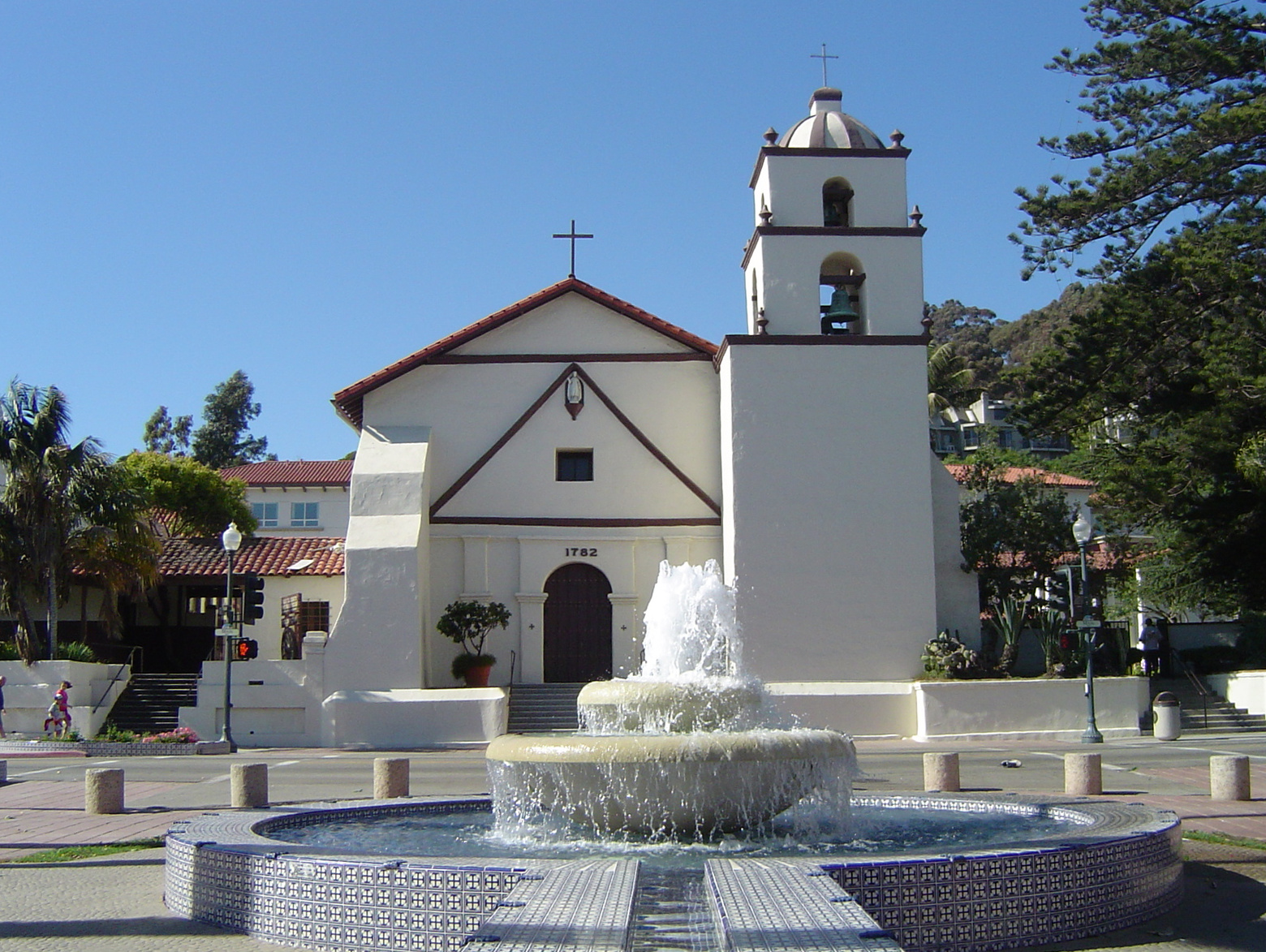
Mission San Buenaventura, located in Ventura.

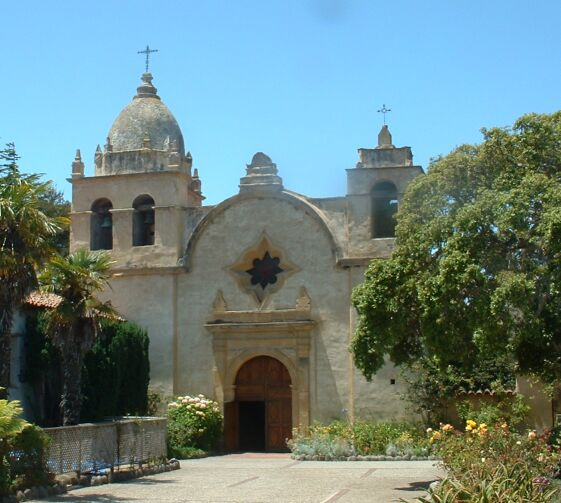
Mission San Carlos Borromeo de Carmelo, located south of Carmel.

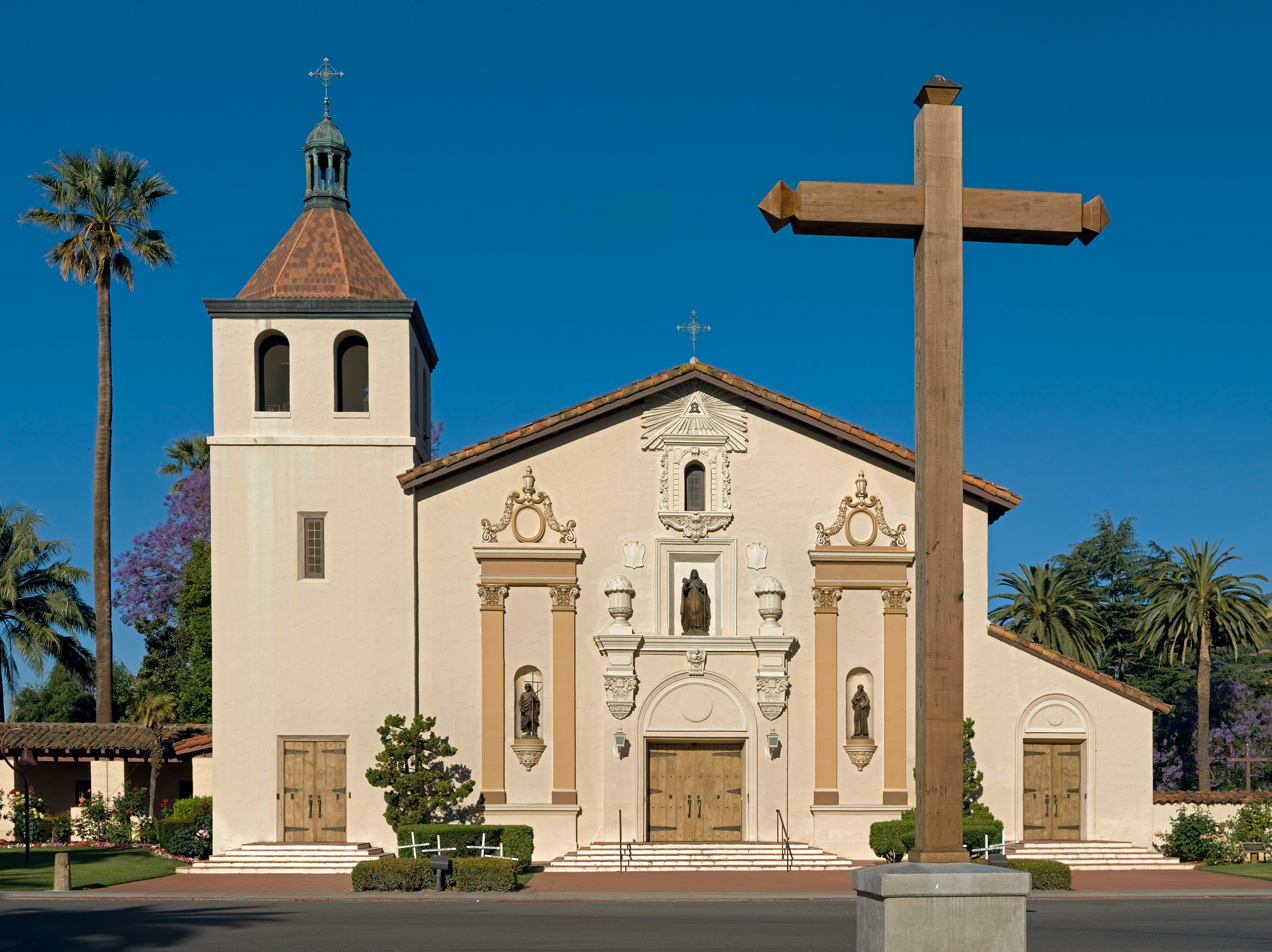
Mission Santa Clara de Asís, located in Santa Clara.

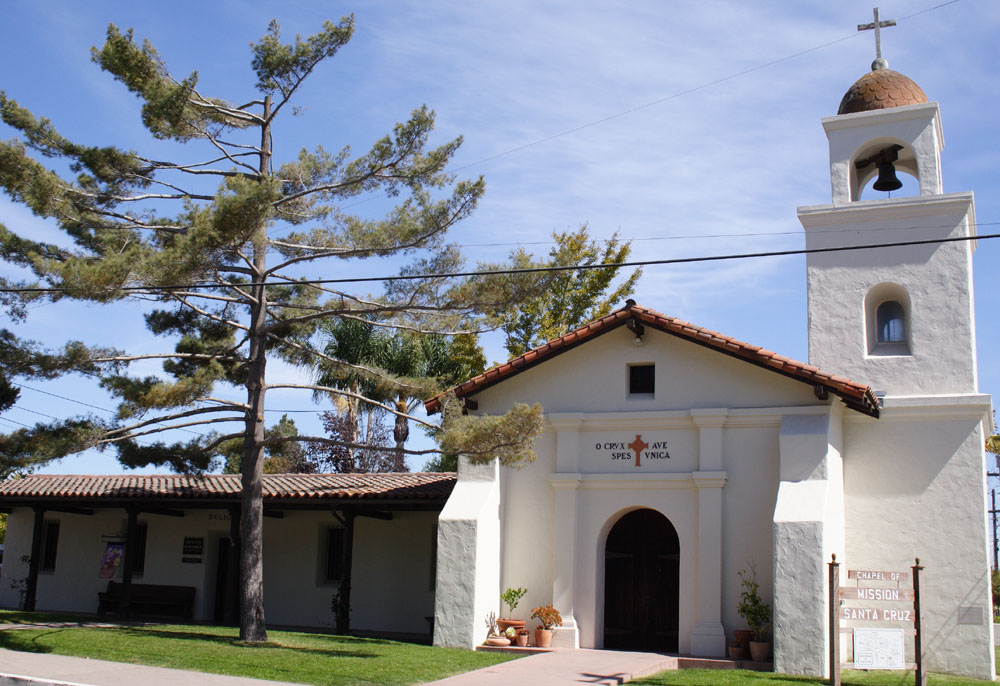
Scale replica of Mission Santa Cruz chapel, located in Santa Cruz.

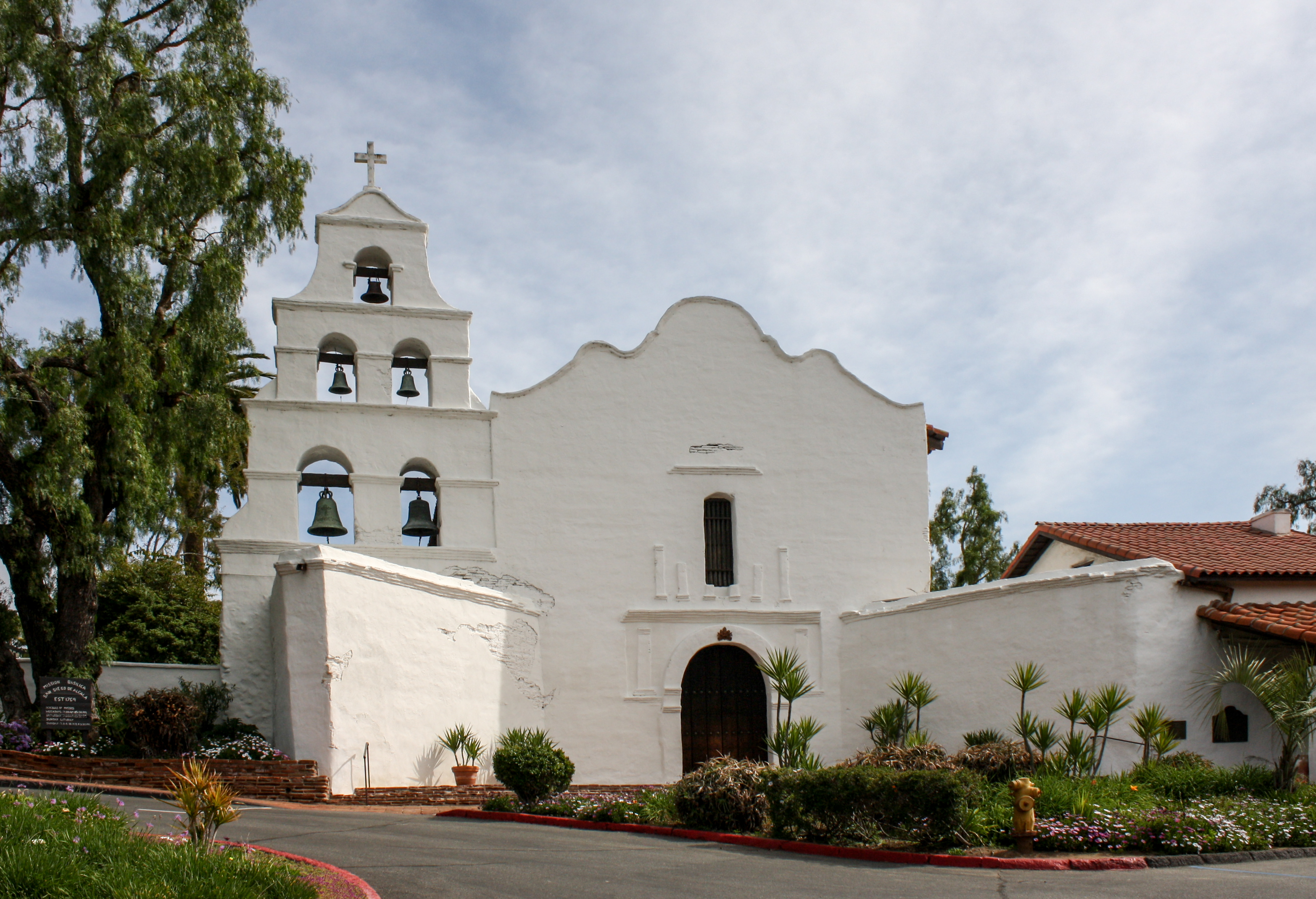
Mission San Diego de Alcalá, located in San Diego.

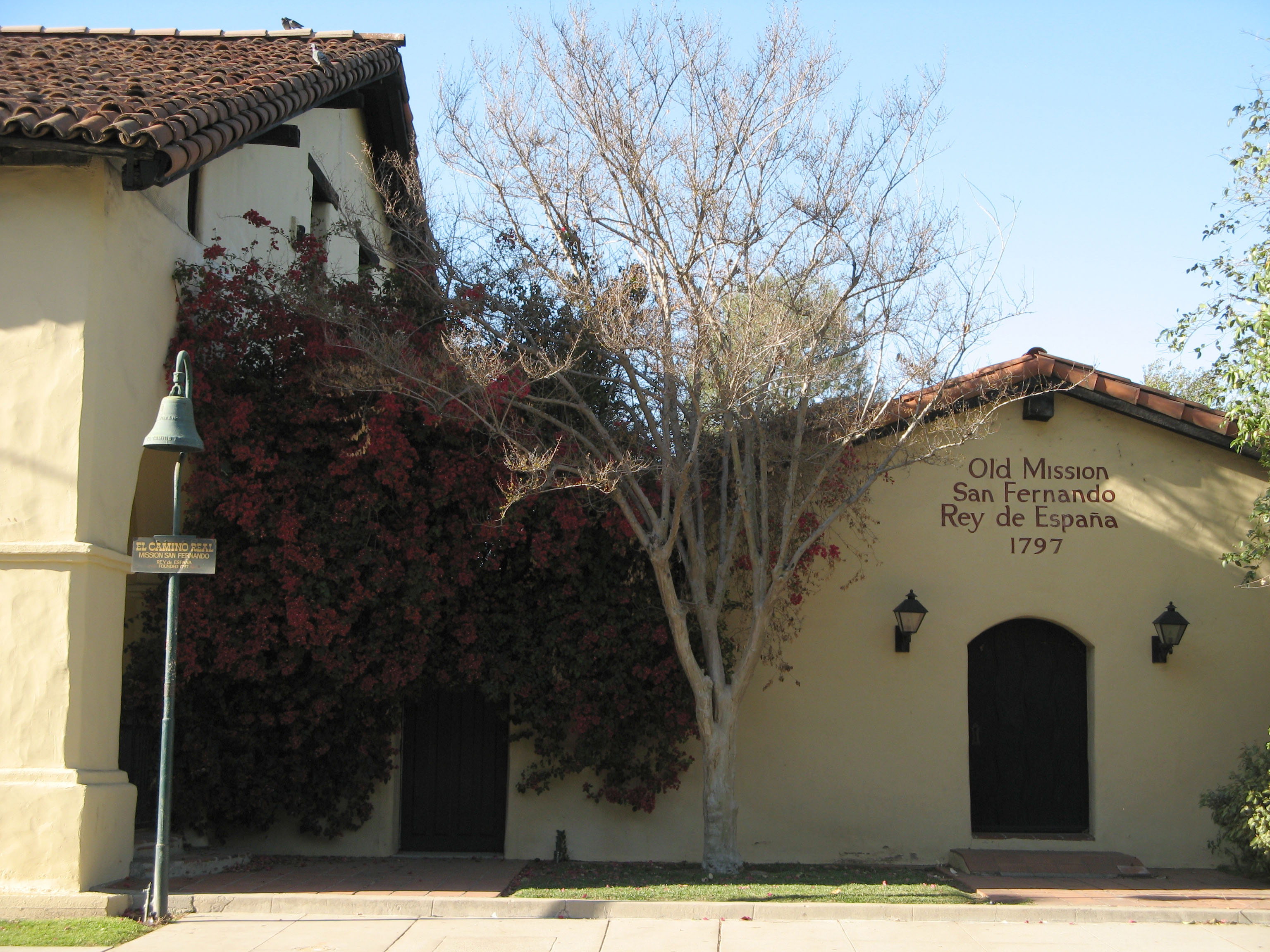
Mission San Fernando Rey de España, located in Mission Hills (Los Angeles).

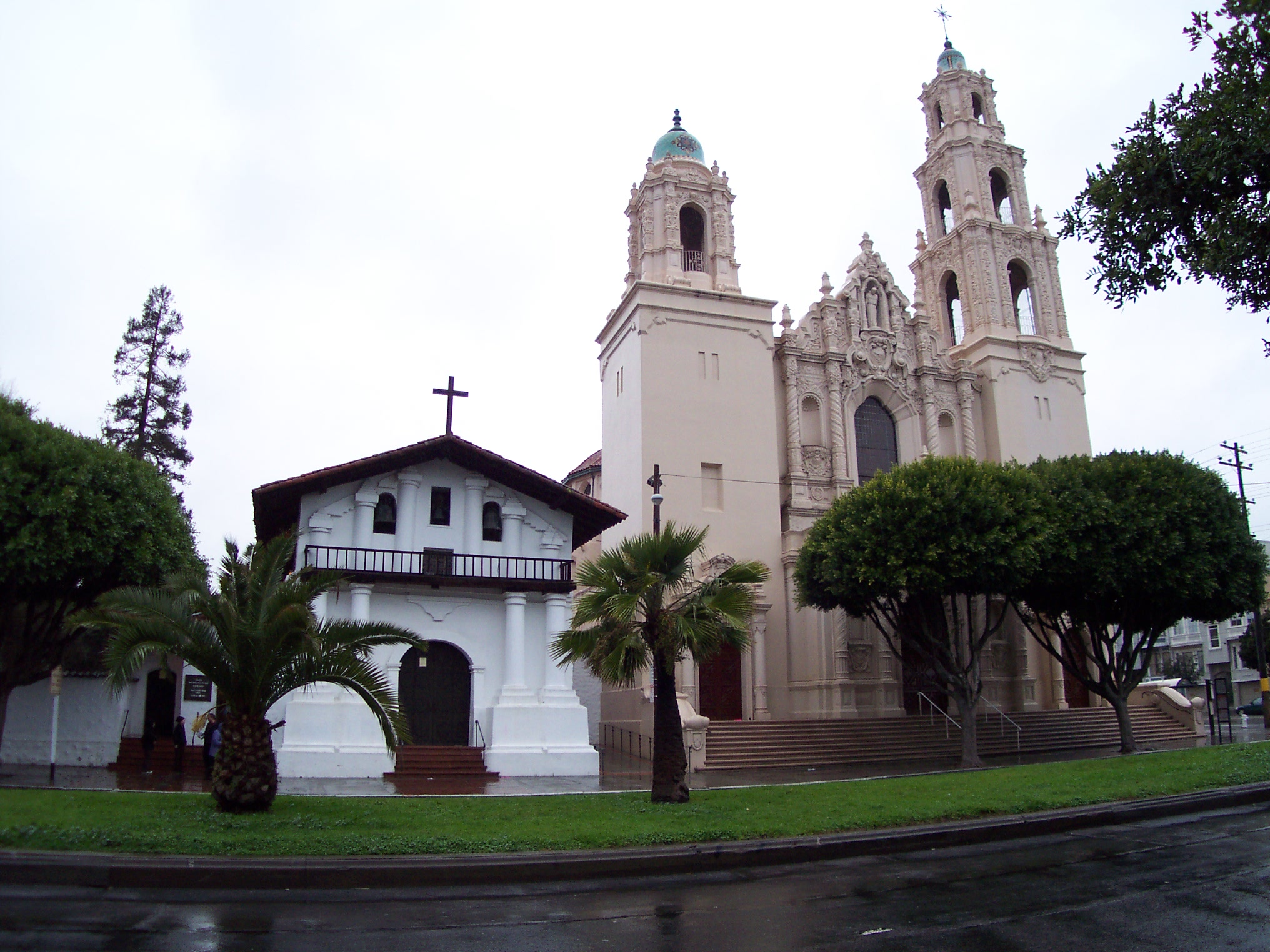
Mission San Francisco de Asís, located in San Francisco.

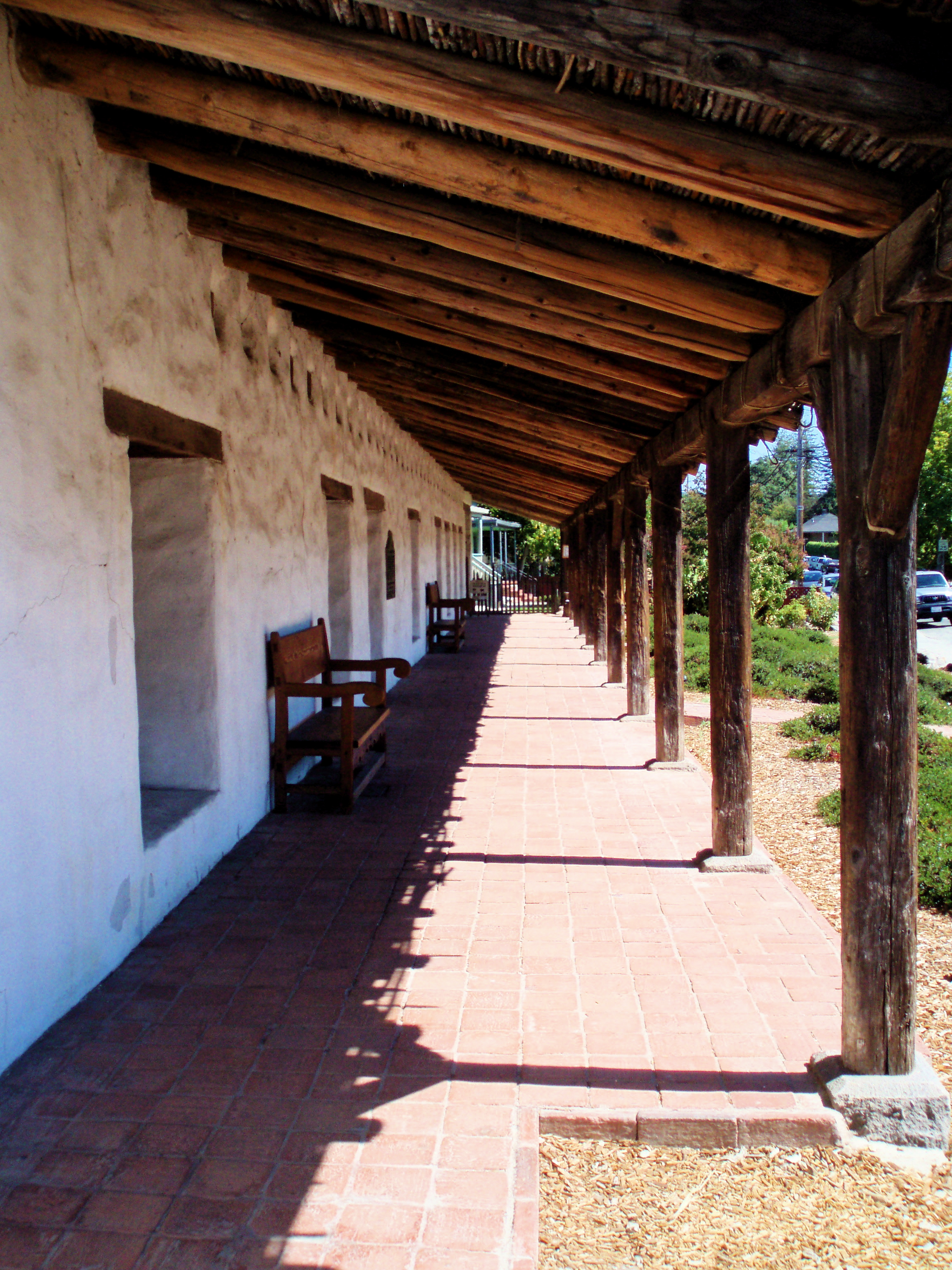
Mission San Francisco Solano, located in Sonoma.

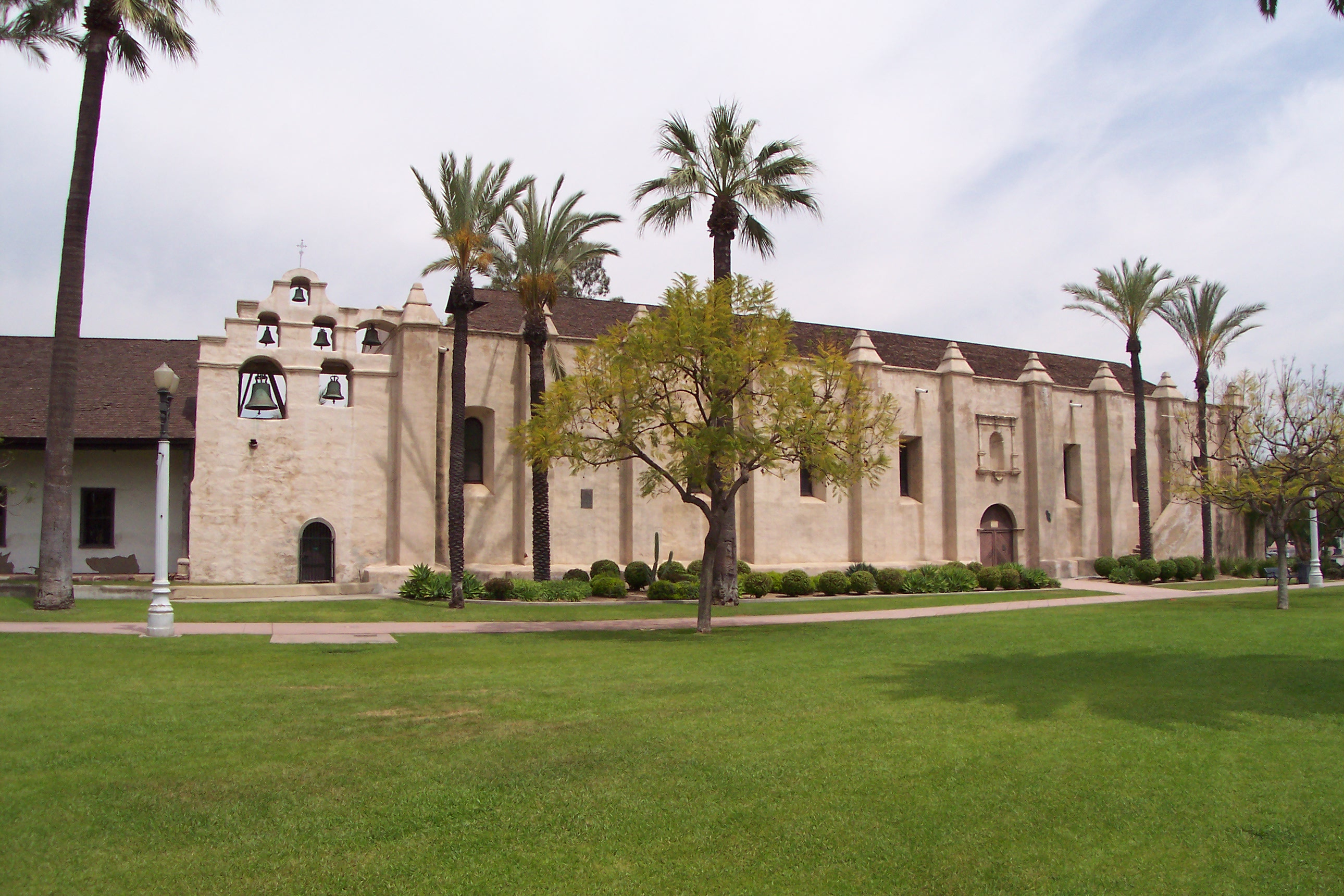
Mission San Gabriel Arcángel, located in San Gabriel.

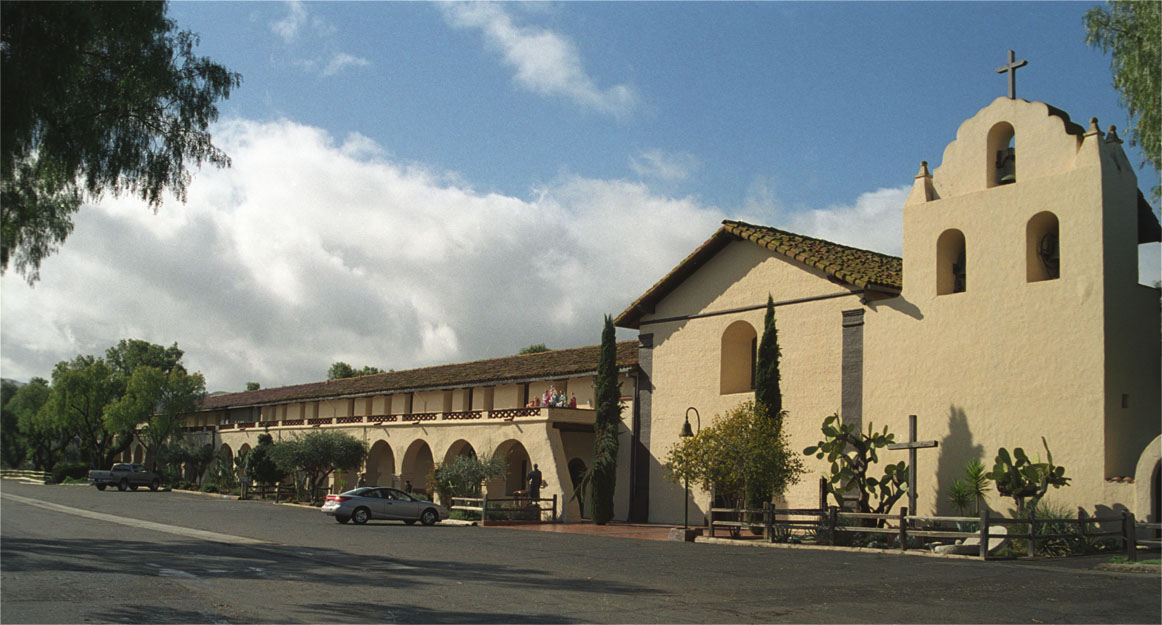
Mission Santa Inés, located in Solvang.

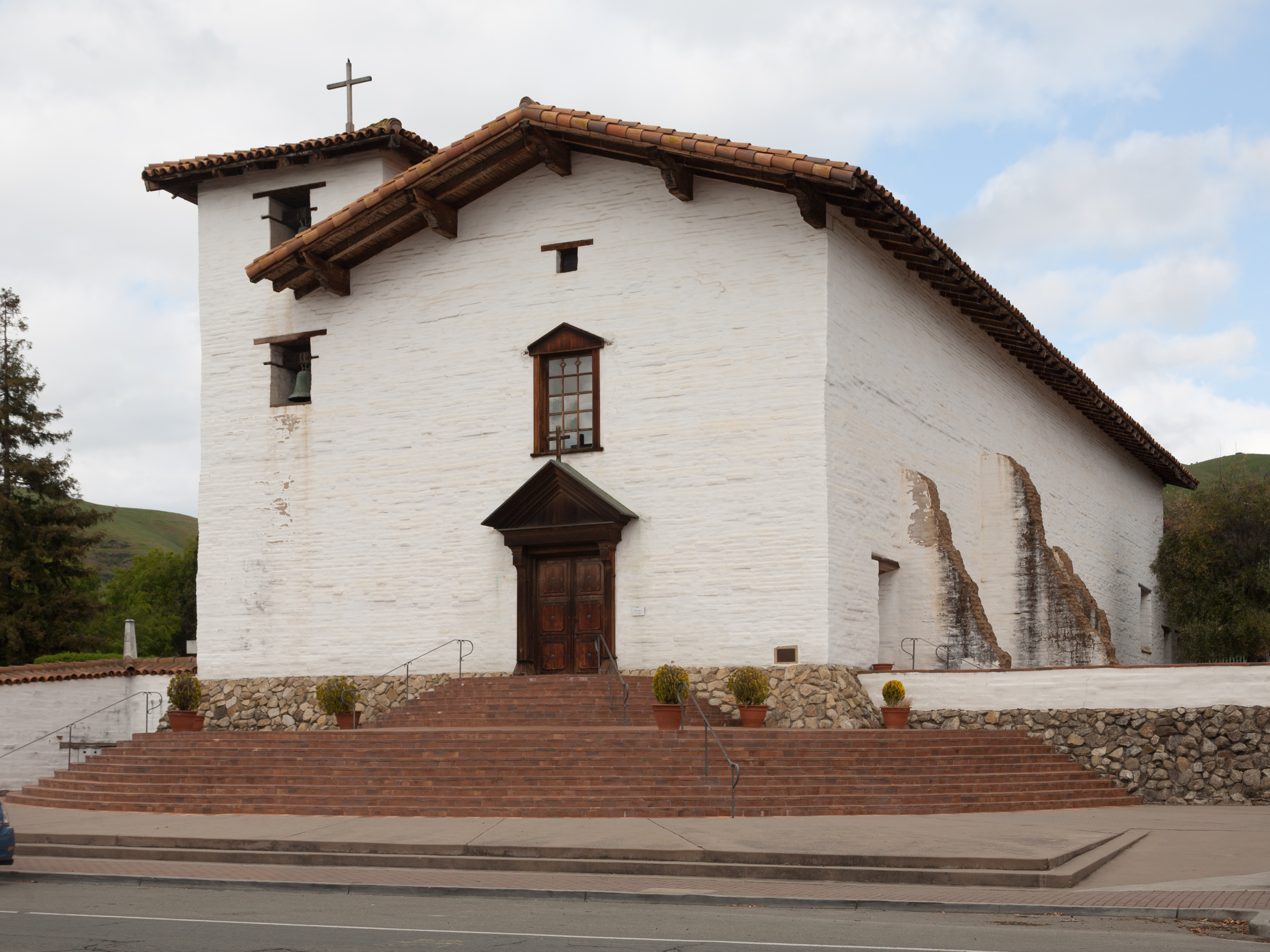
Mission San José, located in Fremont.

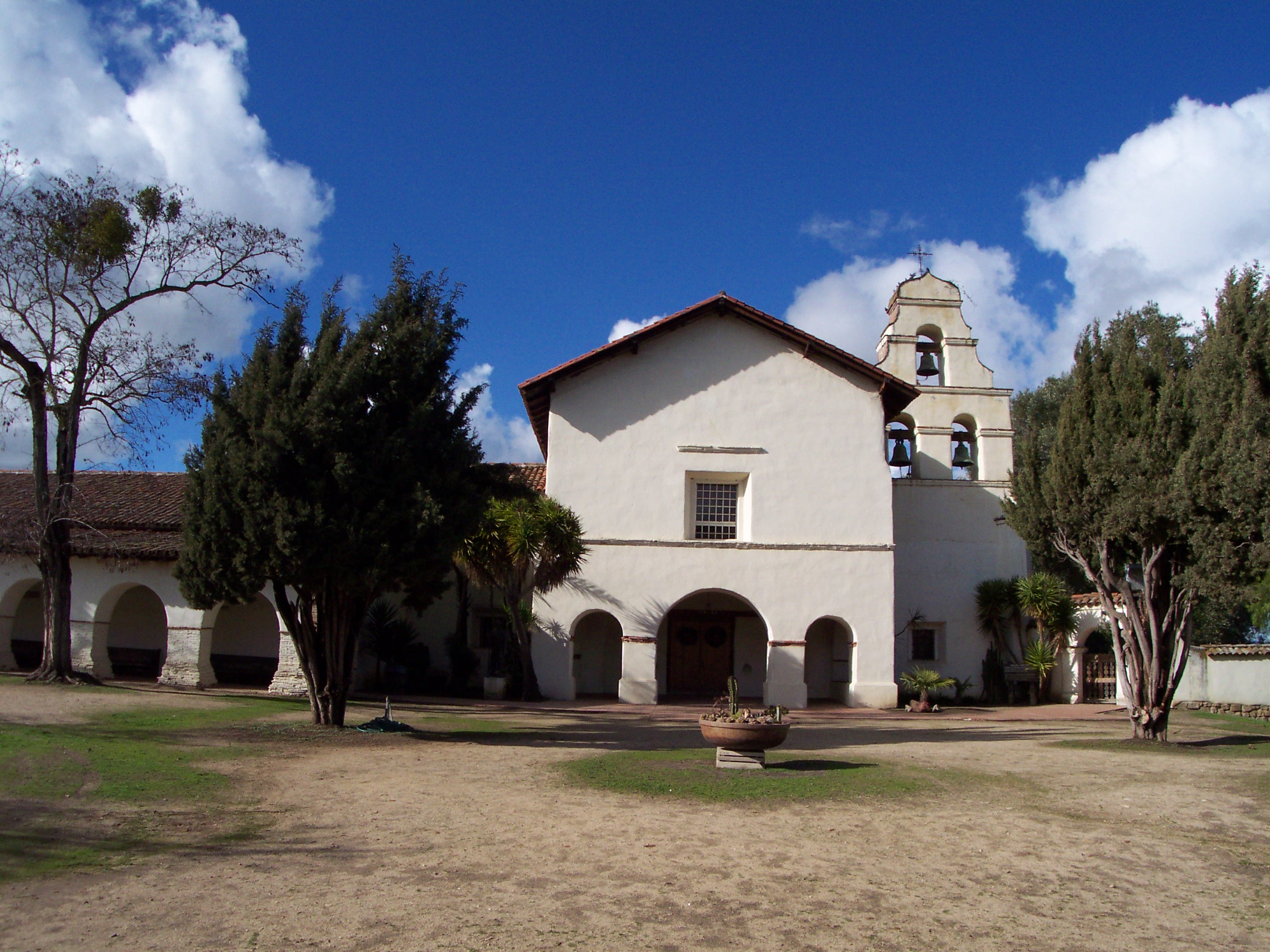
Mission San Juan Bautista, located in San Juan Bautista.

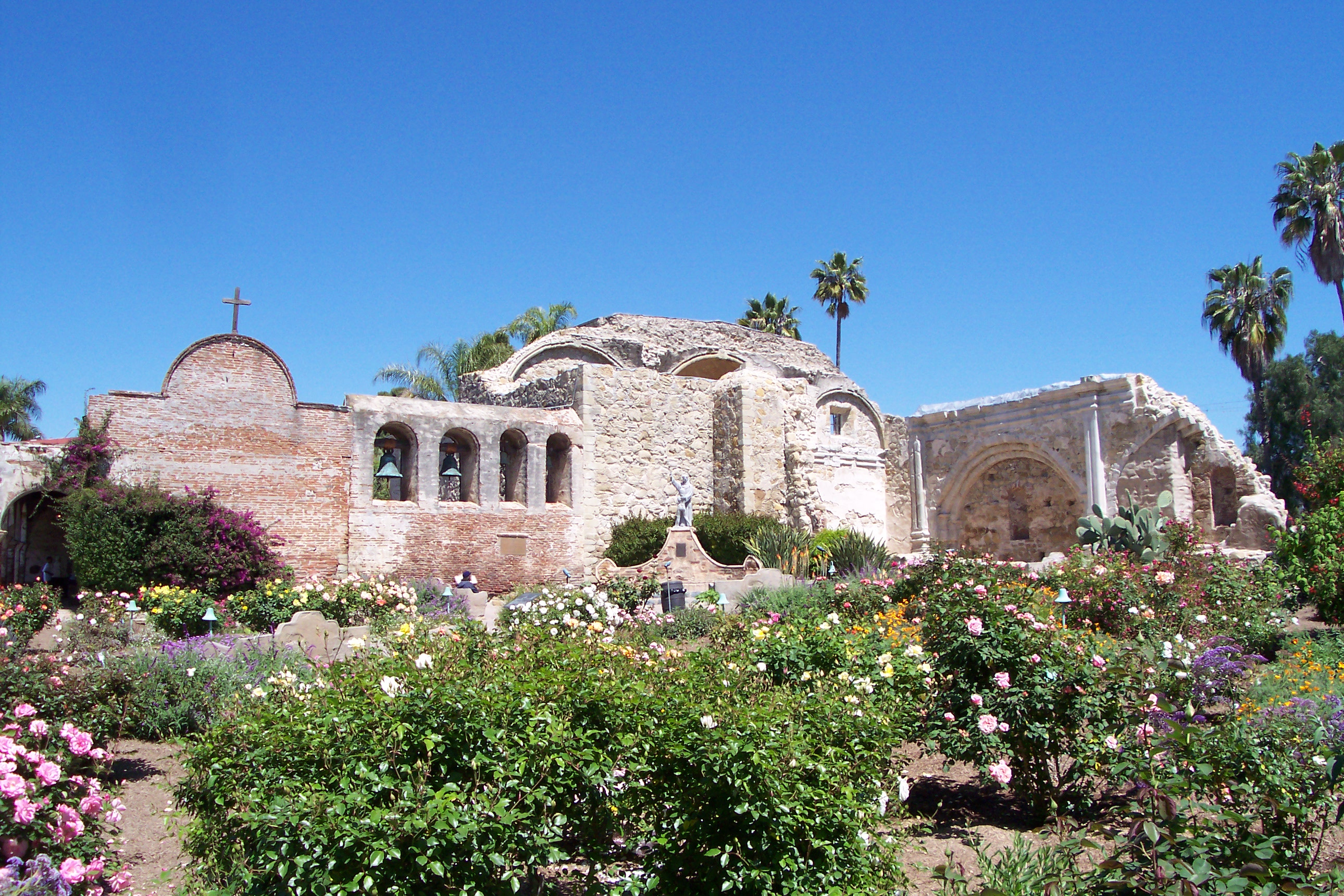
Mission San Juan Capistrano, located in San Juan Capistrano.

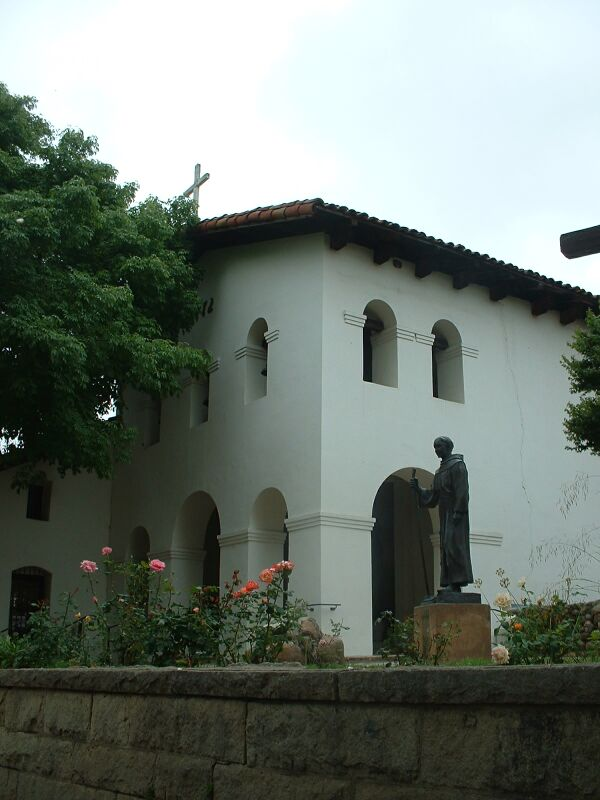
Mission San Luis Obispo de Tolosa, located in San Luis Obispo.

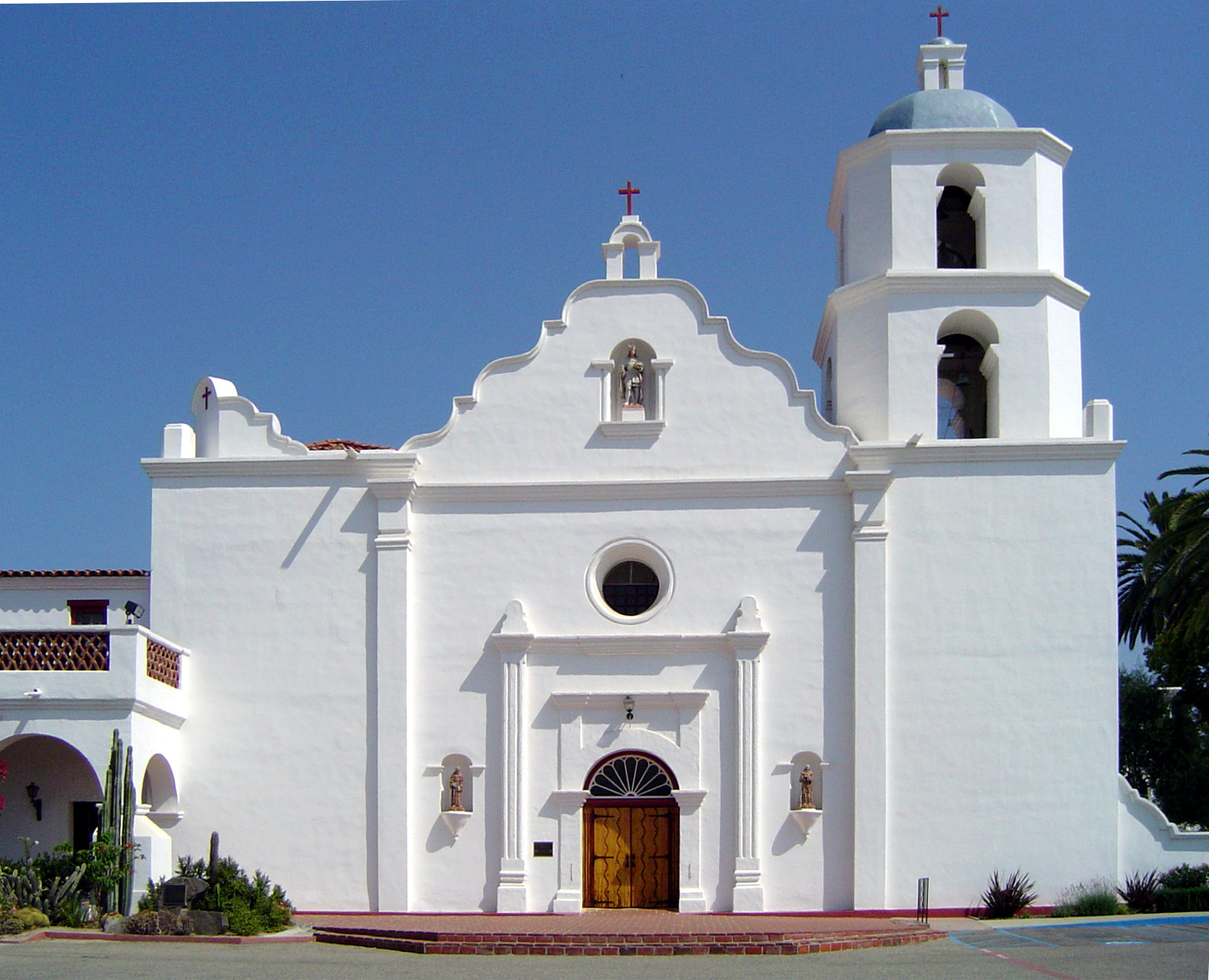
Mission San Luis Rey de Francia, located in Oceanside.

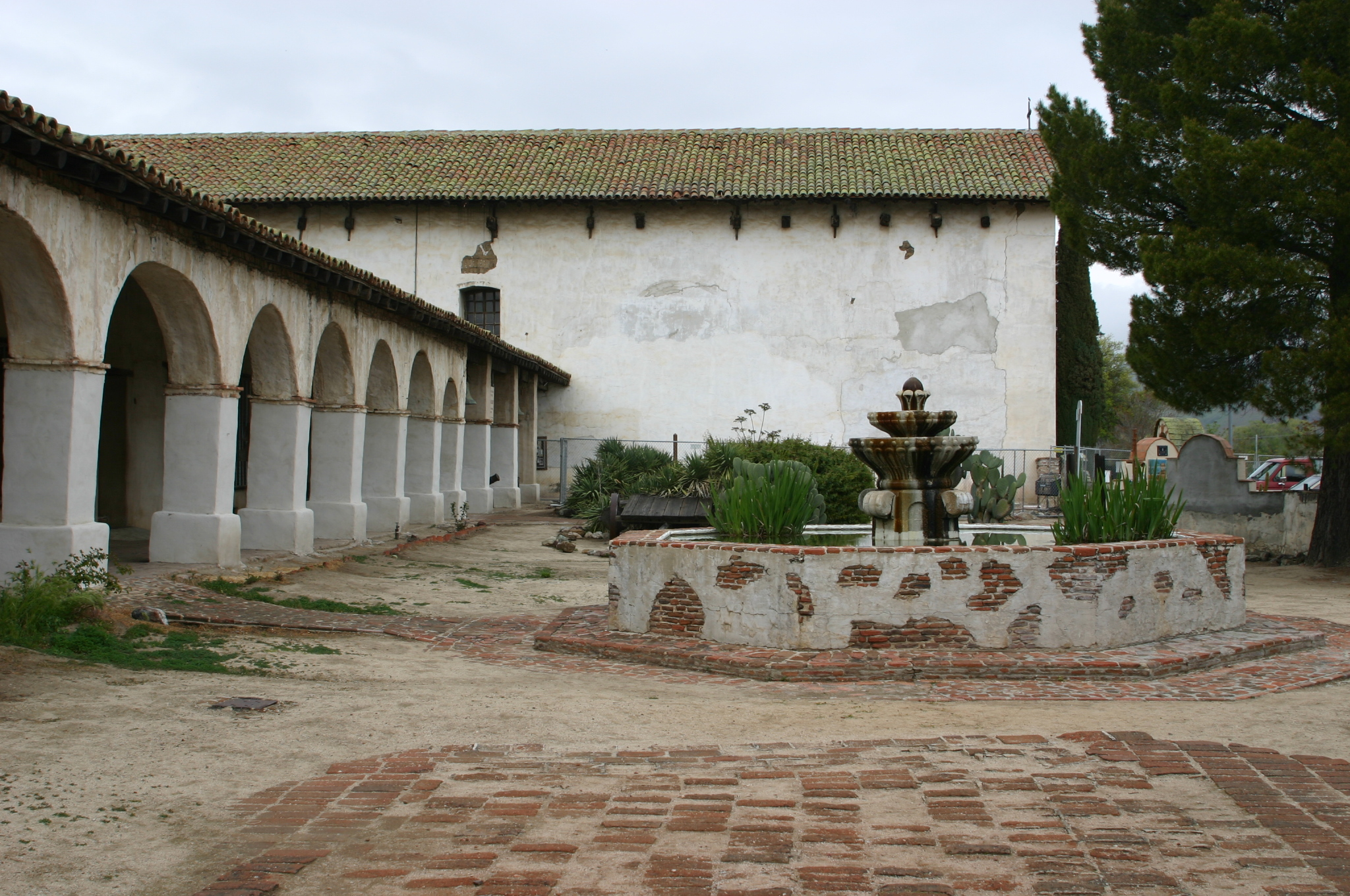
Mission San Miguel Arcángel, located in San Miguel.

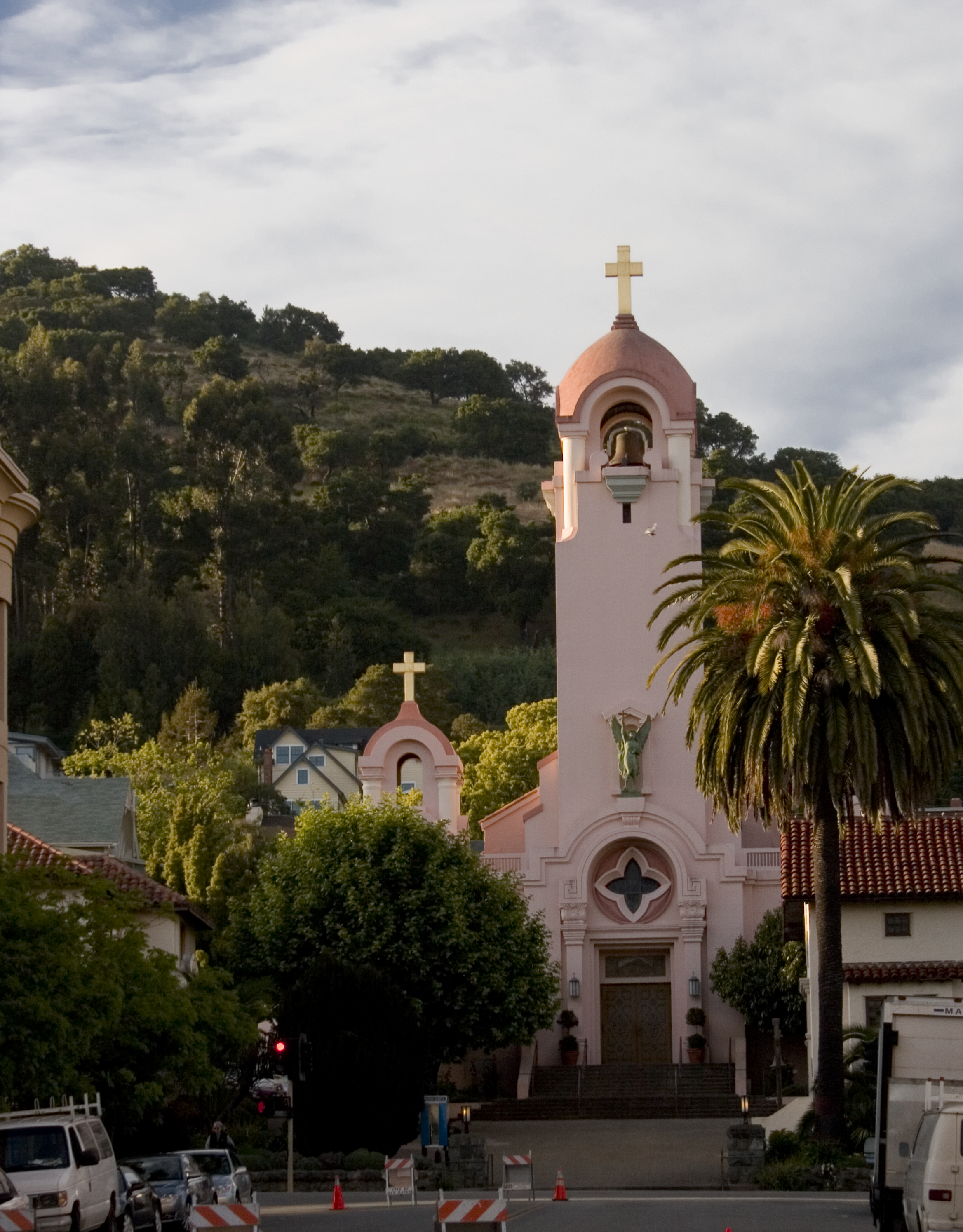
Mission San Rafael Arcángel, located in San Rafael.

== See also ==
On California Missions:

- List of Spanish missions in California
- San Antonio de Pala Asistencia, not a full mission, but still serving the Pala reservation

On California history:

- Juan Bautista de Anza National Historic Trail
- History of California through 1899
- History of the west coast of North America
- Mission Vieja

On general missionary history:

- Catholic Church and the Age of Discovery
- History of Christian Missions
- List of the oldest churches in Mexico
- Missionary

On colonial Spanish American history:

- Spanish colonization of the Americas
- California mission clash of cultures
- Indian Reductions
- California genocide
- Native Americans in the United States
