= Mission San Juan Capistrano (California) =

18th-century Spanish mission in California

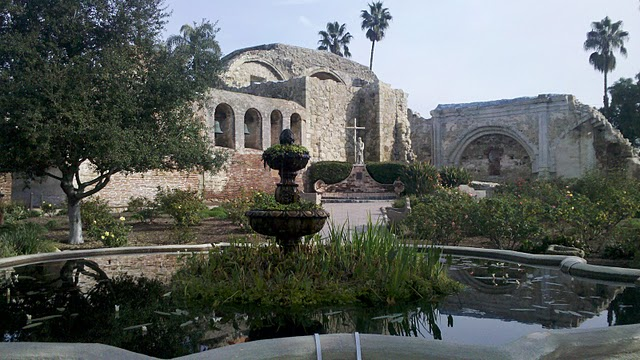
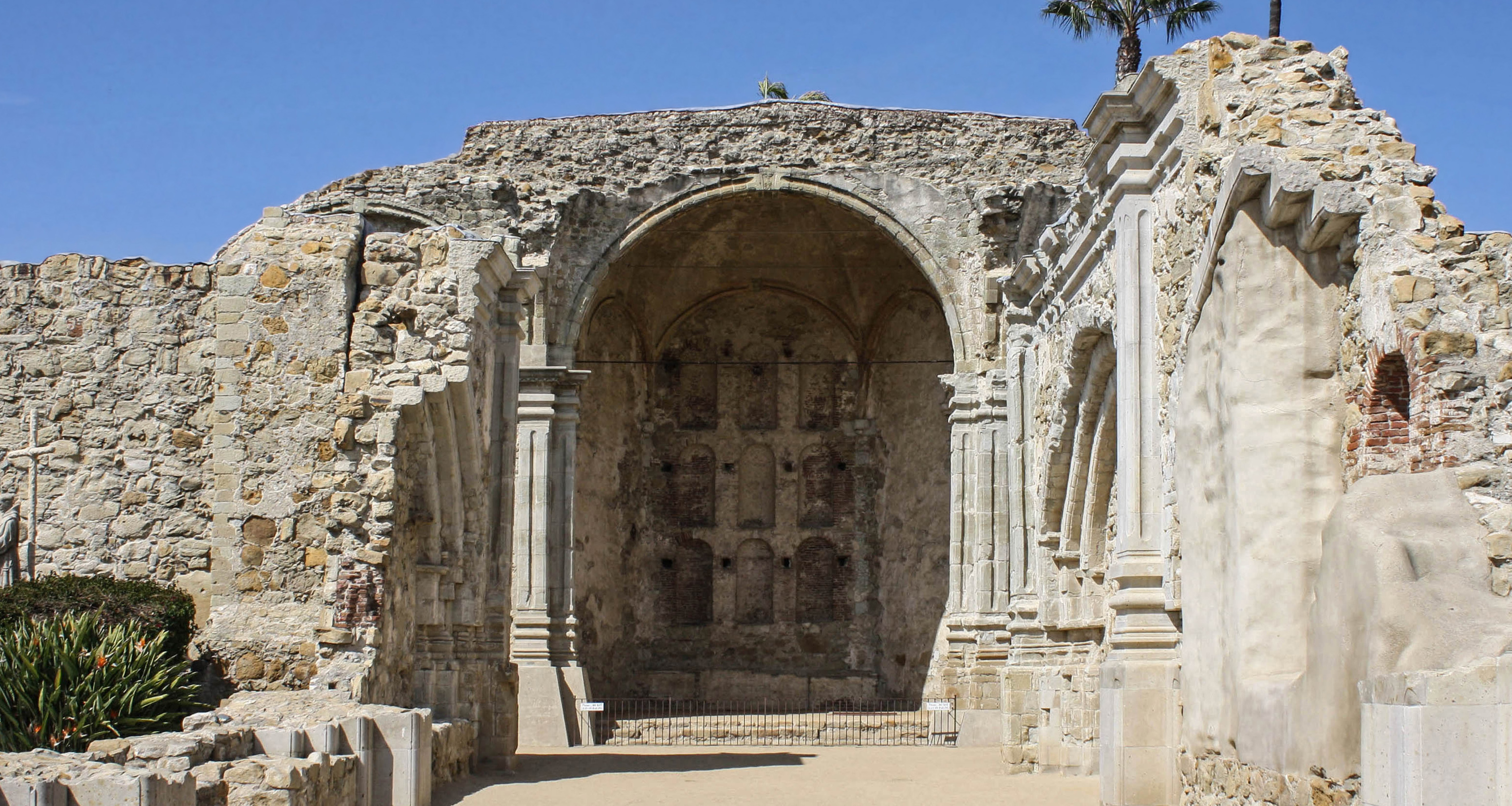
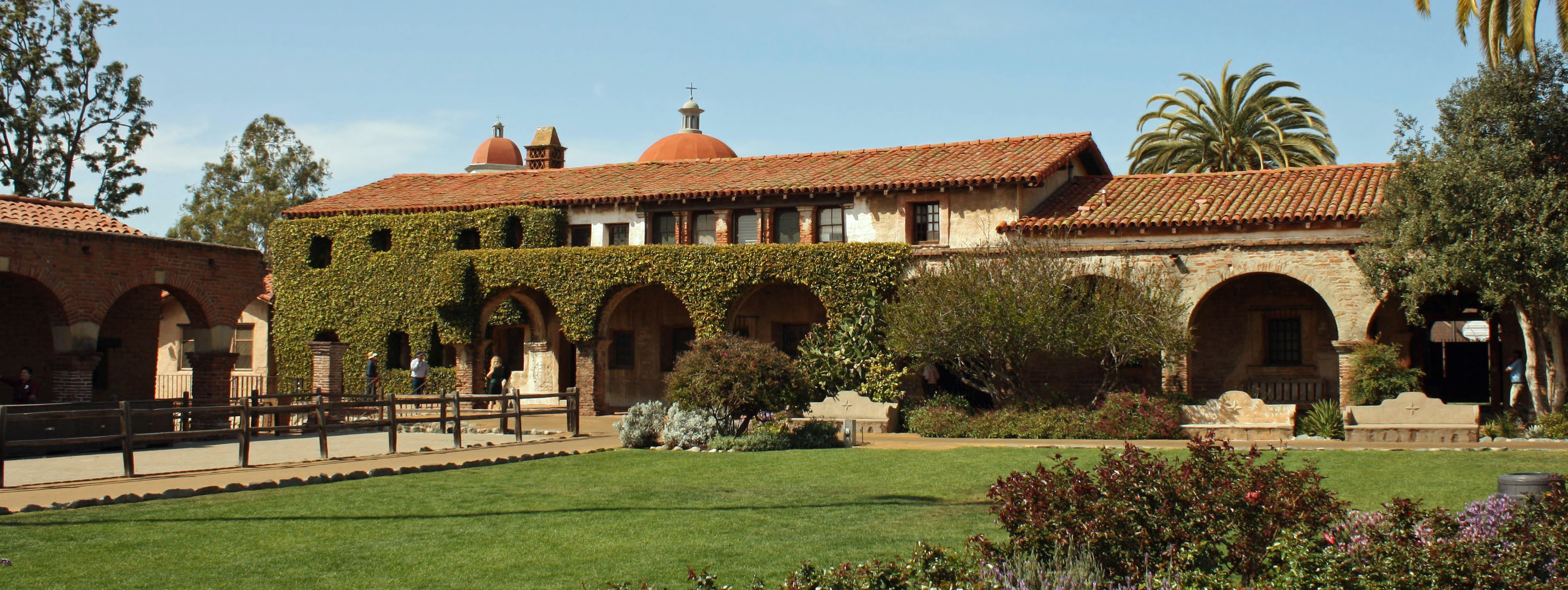
- Mission San Juan Capistrano

- Location in Orange County Location in California Mission San Juan Capistrano (the United States)
- Location: 26801 Ortega Hwy. San Juan Capistrano, California 92675
- Coordinates: 33°30′10″N 117°39′46″W
- Name as founded: La Misión de San Juan Capistrano de Sajavit
- English translation: The Mission of Saint John Capistrano of Sajavit
- Patron: Saint John of Capestrano
- Nicknames: "Jewel of the Missions" "Mission of the Swallow" "Mission of the Tragedies"
- Founded: November 1, 1776 it was the 7th mission.
- Founded by: Fermín Lasuén (1st); Father Presidente Junípero Serra and Gregório Amúrrio (2nd)
- Founding Order: Seventh
- Military district: First
- Native tribe: Acjachemen; Juaneño
- Native place name: Quanís Savit, Sajavit
- Baptisms: 4,340
- Confirmations: 1,182
- Marriages: 1,153
- Burials: 3,126
- Neophyte population: 900
- Secularized: 1833
- Returned to the Church: 1865
- Governing body: Roman Catholic Diocese of Orange
- Current use: Chapel / Museum

U.S. National Register of Historic Places
- Designated: September 3, 1971
- Reference no.: 71000170

California Historical Landmark
- Reference no.: #200

Website
- http://www.missionsjc.com

Mission San Juan Capistrano (Spanish: Misión San Juan Capistrano) is a Spanish mission in San Juan Capistrano, Orange County, California. Founded November 1, 1776 in colonial Las Californias by Spanish Catholic missionaries of the Franciscan Order, it was named for Saint John of Capistrano, a 15th-century Italian priest. The Spanish Colonial Baroque style church was located in the Alta California province of the Viceroyalty of New Spain. The Mission was founded less than 60 yards from the village of Acjacheme. The Mission was secularized by the Mexican government in 1833, and returned to the Roman Catholic Church by the United States government in 1865. The Mission was damaged over the years by a number of natural disasters, but restoration and renovation efforts date from around 1910. It functions today as a museum.

== Introduction ==
The mission was founded in 1776, by the Spanish Catholics of the Franciscan Order. Named for Saint John of Capistrano, a 14th-century theologian and "warrior priest" who resided in the Abruzzo region of Italy, San Juan Capistrano has the distinction of being home to the oldest building in California still in use, a chapel built in 1782. "Father Serra's Church", also known as "Serra's Chapel", is the only extant structure where it has been documented that Junipero Serra celebrated Mass. The mission is one of the best known in Alta California, and one of the few to have actually been founded twice – the others being Mission San Gabriel Arcángel and Mission La Purísima Concepción. The site was originally consecrated on October 30, 1775, by Fermín Lasuén, but was quickly abandoned due to unrest among the indigenous population in San Diego.

The success of the settlement's population is evident in its historical records. Prior to the arrival of the missionaries, some 550 indigenous Acjachemen people lived in this area of their homeland. By 1790, the number of Indian reductions had grown to 700 Mission Indians, and just six years later nearly 1,000 "neophytes" (recent converts) lived in or around the Mission compound. Baptisms in that year alone numbered 1,649 out of the none total 4,639 people converted between 1776 and 1847.

More than 69 former inhabitants, mostly Juaneño Indians, have marked graves in the Mission's cemetery (campo santo). The remains of (later Monsignor) St. John O'Sullivan, who recognized the property's historic value and working tirelessly to conserve and rebuild its structures, are buried at the entrance to the cemetery on west side of the property, and a statue raised in his honor stands at the head of the crypt. The surviving chapel also serves as the final resting place of three priests who passed on while serving at the Mission: José Barona, Vicente Fustér, and Vicente Pascual Oliva are all entombed beneath the sanctuary floor.

The Criolla or "Mission grape," was first planted at San Juan Capistrano in 1779, and in 1783 the first wine produced in Alta California was from the Mission's winery.

The Mission entered a long period of gradual decline after Mexican government secularization in 1833. After 1850 U.S. statehood, numerous efforts were made over the latter 19th century to restore the Mission to its former state, but none achieved much success until the arrival of O'Sullivan in 1910. Restoration efforts continue, and the chapel called "Father Serra Church" is still used for religious services.

Over 500,000 visitors, including 80,000 school children, come to the Mission each year. And while the ruins of "The Great Stone Church" (which was all but leveled by an 1812 earthquake) are a renowned architectural wonder, the Mission is perhaps best known for the annual "Return of the Swallows" which is traditionally observed every March 19 (Saint Joseph's Day). Mission San Juan Capistrano has served as a favorite subject for many notable artists, and has been immortalized in literature and on film numerous times.

In 1984, a modern church complex was constructed just north and west of the Mission compound and is now known as Mission Basilica San Juan Capistrano. Today, the mission compound serves as a museum, with the Serra Chapel within the compound serving as a chapel for the mission parish.

== History ==
=== Indigenous peoples ===
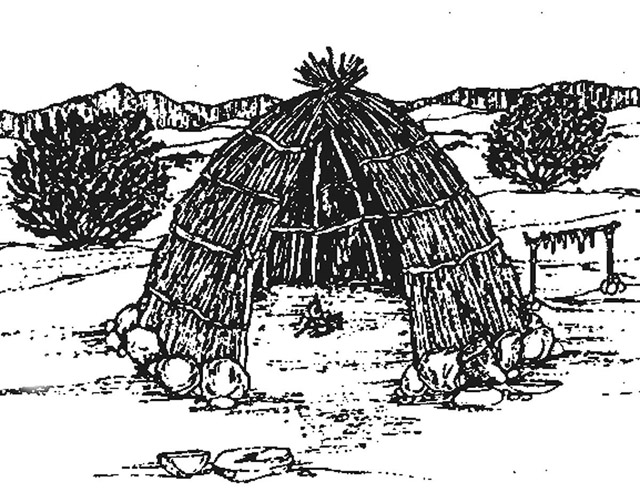
Pre-contact Acjachemen built cone-shaped huts made of willow branches covered with brush or mats made of tule leaves. Known as Kiichas (or wikiups), the temporary shelters were used for sleeping or as refuge in cases of inclement weather. When a dwelling reached the end of its practical life it was simply burned, and a replacement erected in its place in about a day's time.

The former Spanish settlement at Sajavit lies within that area occupied during the late Paleoindian period and continuing on into the present day by the Native American society commonly known as the Juaneño; the name denotes those people who were ministered by the priests at Mission San Juan Capistrano. Many contemporary Juaneño, who identify themselves as descendants of the indigenous society living in the local San Juan and San Mateo Creek drainage areas, have adopted the indigenous term Acjachemen. Their language was related to the Luiseño language spoken by the nearby Luiseño tribe.

The Acjachemen territory extended from Las Pulgas Creek in northern San Diego County up into the San Joaquin Hills along Orange County's central coast, and inland from the Pacific Ocean up into the Santa Ana Mountains. The bulk of the population occupied the outlets of two large creeks, San Juan Creek (and its major tributary, Trabuco Creek) and San Mateo Creek (combined with Arroyo San Onofre, which drained into the ocean at the same point). The highest concentration of villages was along the lower San Juan, where Mission San Juan Capistrano was ultimately situated and is preserved today. The Acjachemen resided in permanent, well-defined villages and seasonal camps. Village populations ranged from between 35 and 300 inhabitants, consisting of a single lineage in the smaller villages, and of a dominant clan joined with other families in the larger settlements.

Each clan had its own resource territory and was "politically" independent; ties to other villages were maintained through economic, religious, and social networks in the immediate region. The elite class (composed chiefly families, lineage heads, and other ceremonial specialists), a middle class (established and successful families), and people of disconnected or wandering families and captives of war comprised the three hierarchical social classes. Native leadership consisted of the Nota, or clan chief, who conducted community rites and regulated ceremonial life in conjunction with the council of elders (Puuplem), which was made up of lineage heads and ceremonial specialists in their own right. This body decided upon matters of the community, which were then carried out by the Nota and his underlings. While the placement of residential huts in a village was not regulated, the ceremonial enclosure (Vanquech) and the chief's home were most often centrally located.

Much has been discovered about the native inhabitants in recent centuries, thanks in part to the efforts of the Spanish explorer Juan Rodríguez Cabrillo, who documented his observations of life in the coastal villages he encountered along the Southern California coast in October 1542. Fray Gerónimo Boscana, a Franciscan scholar who was stationed at San Juan Capistrano for more than a decade beginning in 1812, compiled what is widely considered to be the most comprehensive study of prehistoric religious practices in the San Juan Capistrano valley. Religious knowledge was secret, and the prevalent religion, called Chinigchinich, placed village chiefs in the position of religious leaders, an arrangement that gave the chiefs broad power over their people. Boscana divided the Acjachemen into two classes: the "Playanos" (who lived along the coast) and the "Serranos" (who inhabited the mountains, some three to four leagues from the Mission). The religious beliefs of the two groups as related to creation differed quite profoundly. The Playanos held that an all-powerful and unseen being called "Nocuma" brought about the earth and the sea, together with all of the trees, plants, and animals of sky, land, and water contained therein. The Serranos, on the other hand, believed in two separate but related existences: the "existence above" and the "existence below." These states of being were "altogether explicable and indefinite" (like brother and sister), and it was the fruits of the union of these two entities that created "...the rocks and sands of the earth; then trees, shrubbery, herbs and grass; then animals". In 1908, noted cultural anthropologist Alfred L. Kroeber published the following observations with regard to the Juaneño religious observances:

We know that they adore a large bird similar to a kite, which they raise with the greatest of care from the time it is young, and they hold to many errors regarding it.

When a new moon shows itself they make a great outcry, which manifests their interest ("negosijo"). If there is an eclipse of the sun or of the moon, they shout with still louder outcries, beating the ground, skins, or mats with sticks, which shows their concerns and uneasiness.

=== Mission Period (1776–1833) ===
Juan Crespí, as a member of the 1769 Spanish Portolà expedition, authored the first written account of interaction between Europeans and the indigenous population in the region that today makes up Orange County. The expedition arrived at the site from the northeast, traveling down San Juan Creek, and camped near the future mission site on July 23. At the time, Crespi named the campsite after Santa Maria Magdalena (though it would also come to be called the Arroyo de la Quema and Cañada del Incendio, "Wildfire Hollow").

In early 1775, Don Antonio María de Bucareli y Ursúa, Viceroy of New Spain, authorized the establishment of a mission at a logical halfway point between Mission San Diego de Alcalá and Mission San Gabriel Arcángel. By that time, the site was already known by the name of its patron saint, "San Juan Capistrano".

Up from the south slow filed a train,

Priests and Soldiers of Old Spain,
Who, through sunlit lomas wound
With cross and lance, intent to found
A mission in the wild to John
Soldier-Saint of Capistrano.

— Saunders and Chase, The California Padres and Their Missions, p. 65

At the proposed site, located approximately 26 leguas (Spanish Leagues) north of San Diego, 18 leagues south of San Gabriel, and half a league from the Pacific Ocean, an enramada (arbor) was constructed, two bronze bells were hung from the branch of a nearby tree, and a wooden cross was erected. The grounds were consecrated by Fermín Lasuén of Mission San Carlos Borromeo de Carmelo on October 30, 1775 (the last day of the octave after the feast of San Juan Capistrano), near an Indian settlement named "Sajavit"; thus, La Misión de San Juan Capistrano de Sajavit was founded.

Assisting clergy Gregório Amúrrio of Mission San Luis Obispo arrived from San Gabriel eight days later with a supply of goods and cattle. Unfortunately, word arrived from San Diego at the same time that a group of natives attacked the mission and brutally murdered one of the missionaries (Luís Jayme). Since it was feared at the time that any hostile action by the natives against the few burgeoning outposts might break Spain's tenuous hold on Alta California, the priests quickly buried the San Juan Capistrano Mission bells. Lieutenant José Francisco Ortega, military leader of the expedition, led all but a small contingent of Spanish soldiers back to El Presidio de San Diego to help quell the uprising; the priests, along with the few remaining soldiers as an escort, gathered up their belongings and fled to the safety of the Presido, where they were given further details of the disaster.

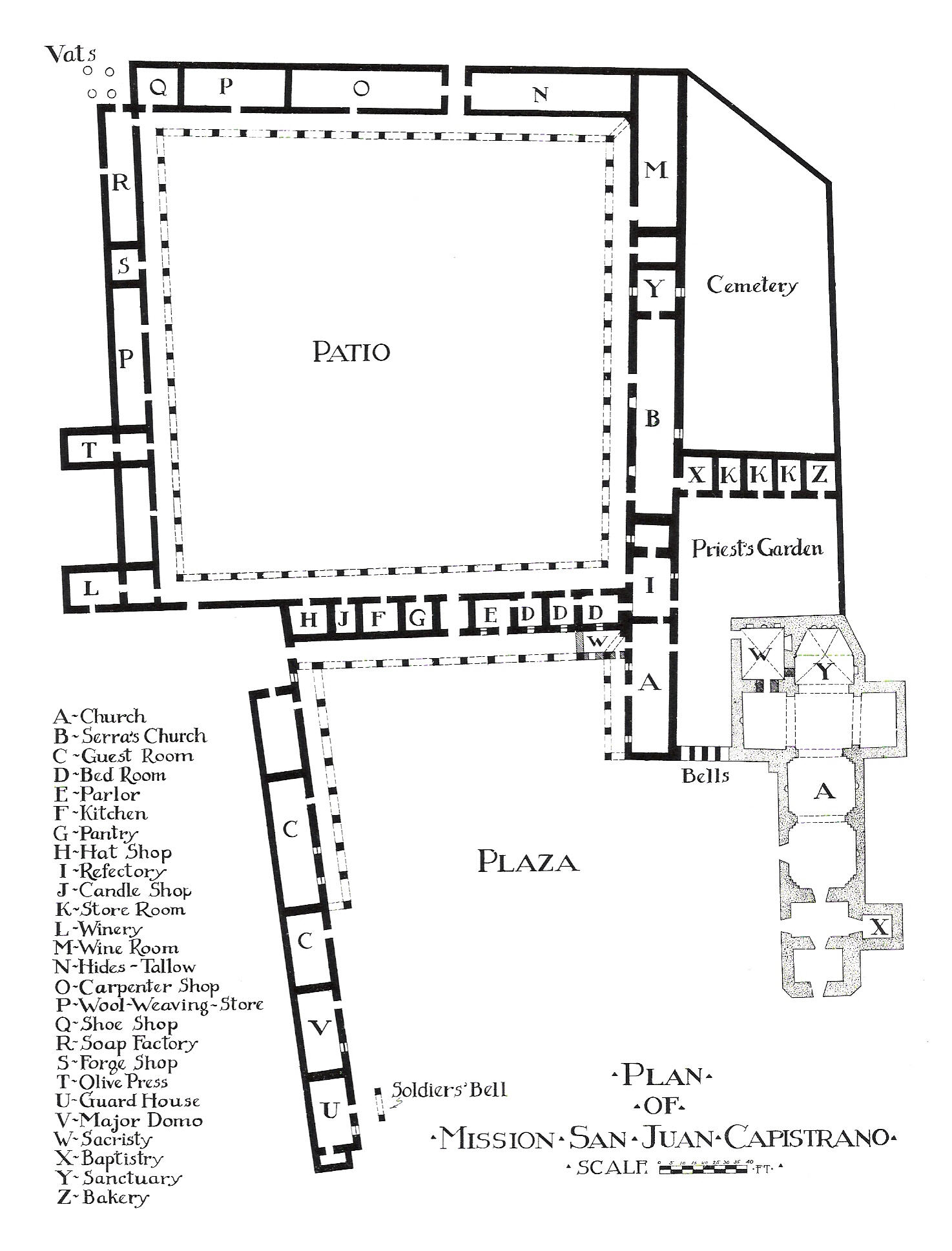
A plan view of the Mission San Juan Capistrano complex (including the footprint of the "Great Stone Church") prepared by architectural historian Rexford Newcomb in 1916.

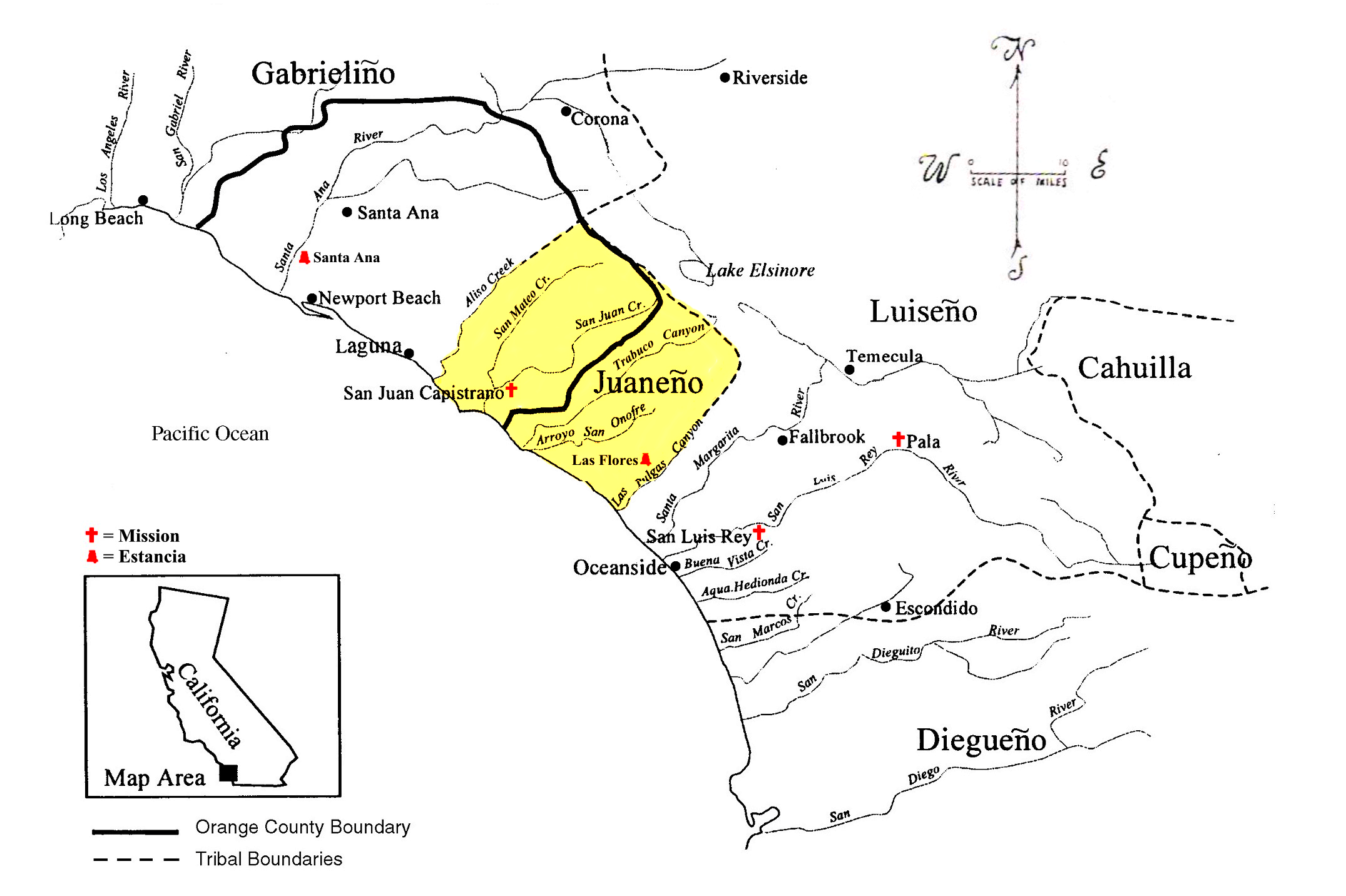
The territorial boundaries of the Southern California Indian tribes based on dialect, including the Cahuilla, Cupeño, Diegueño, Gabrieliño, Juaneño (highlighted), and Luiseño language groups.

One year later Serra himself, along with Amúrrio and Pablo de Mugártegui, took up work on the Mission at San Juan Capistrano; the contingent, accompanied by eleven soldiers, arrived on October 30 or 31, 1776. Upon their return to the site today known as "Mission Vieja," the party excavated the bells and constructed a new arbor; the original wooden cross was, to their surprise, still standing. Serra celebrated High Mass in thanksgiving on November 1, 1776—celebrated ever since as the official founding date. Due to an inadequate water supply the Mission site was subsequently relocated approximately three miles to the west less than 60 yards from the village of Acágcheme. The new venue was strategically placed above two nearby streams, the Trabuco and the San Juan. Mission San Gabriel provided cattle and neophyte labor to assist in the development of the new Mission. Amúrrio performed the Mission's first baptism on December 19 of that year (a total of 4,639 souls were converted at the Mission between 1776 and 1847.) The first Indian marriage was blessed by Mugártegui on the feast of the "Espousals of the Blessed Virgin Mary," January 23, 1777. Mugártegui also presided over the first burial ceremony on July 13 (the first burial on Mission grounds would not take place until March 9, 1781). The Registers of Baptisms, Marriages, and Burials are all intact and preserved at the Mission, as is the Confirmation Register (San Juan Capistrano is one of the few Missions to have retained this document). Serra visited the Mission for the first time since its founding and administered the Sacrament of Confirmation on October 22. In 1778, the first adobe capilla (chapel) was blessed. It was replaced by a larger, 115-foot (35 m) long house of worship in 1782, which is regarded as the oldest standing building in California. Known proudly as the "Serra Chapel," it also has the distinction of being the only remaining church in which Serra is known to have officiated ("Mission Dolores" was still under construction at the time of Serra's visit there). Serra presided over the confirmations of 213 people on October 12 and 13, 1783. By the time of the chapel's completion, living quarters, kitchens (pozolera), workshops, storerooms, soldiers' barracks (cuartels), and a number of other ancillary buildings had also been erected, effectively forming the main cuadrángulo (quadrangle).

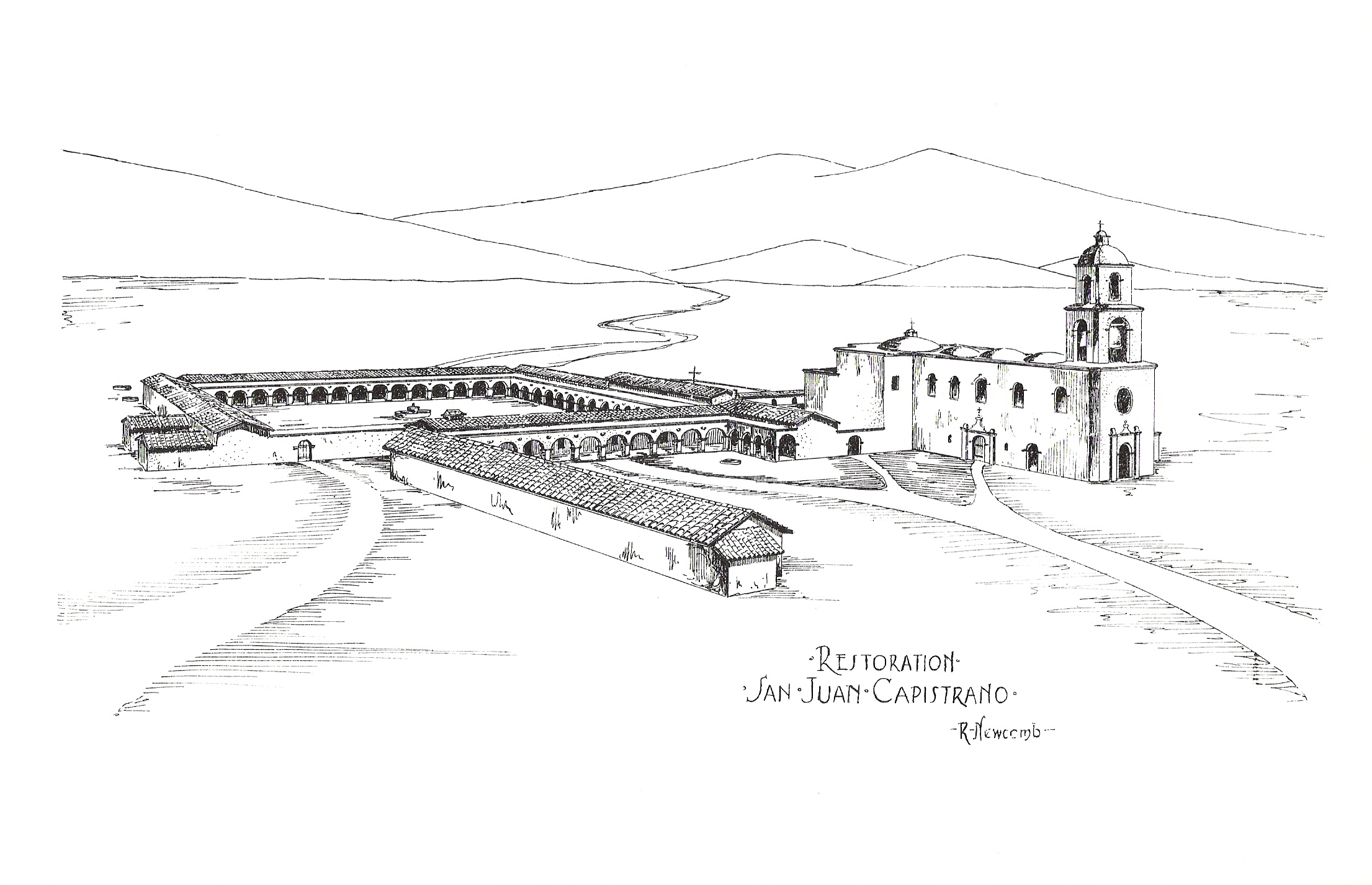
Artist Rexford Newcomb's conception of Mission San Juan Capistrano in its heyday. The intact "Great Stone Church" is depicted at the far right. No contemporary drawing or painting of the Mission was ever completed.

California's first vineyard was located on the Mission grounds, with the planting of the "Mission" or "Criollo" grape in 1779, one grown extensively throughout Spanish America at the time but with "an uncertain European origin." It was the only grape grown in the Mission system throughout the mid-19th century. The first winery in Alta California was built in San Juan Capistrano in 1783; both red and white wines (sweet and dry), brandy, and a port-like fortified wine called Angelica were all produced from the Mission grape. In 1791, the Mission's two original bells were removed from the tree branch on which they had been hanging for the previous fifteen years and placed within a permanent mounting. Over the next two decades the Mission prospered, and in 1794 over seventy adobe structures were built in order to provide permanent housing for the Mission Indians, some of which comprise the oldest residential neighborhood in California. It was decided that a larger, European-style church was required to accommodate the growing population. Hoping to construct an edifice of truly magnificent proportions, the priests retained the services of maestro albañil (master stonemason) Isídro Aguilár of Culiacán. Aguílar took charge of the church's construction and set about incorporating numerous design features not found at any other California Mission, including the use of a domed roof structure made of stone as opposed to the typical flat wood roof. His elegant roof design called for six vaulted domes (bovedas) to be built.

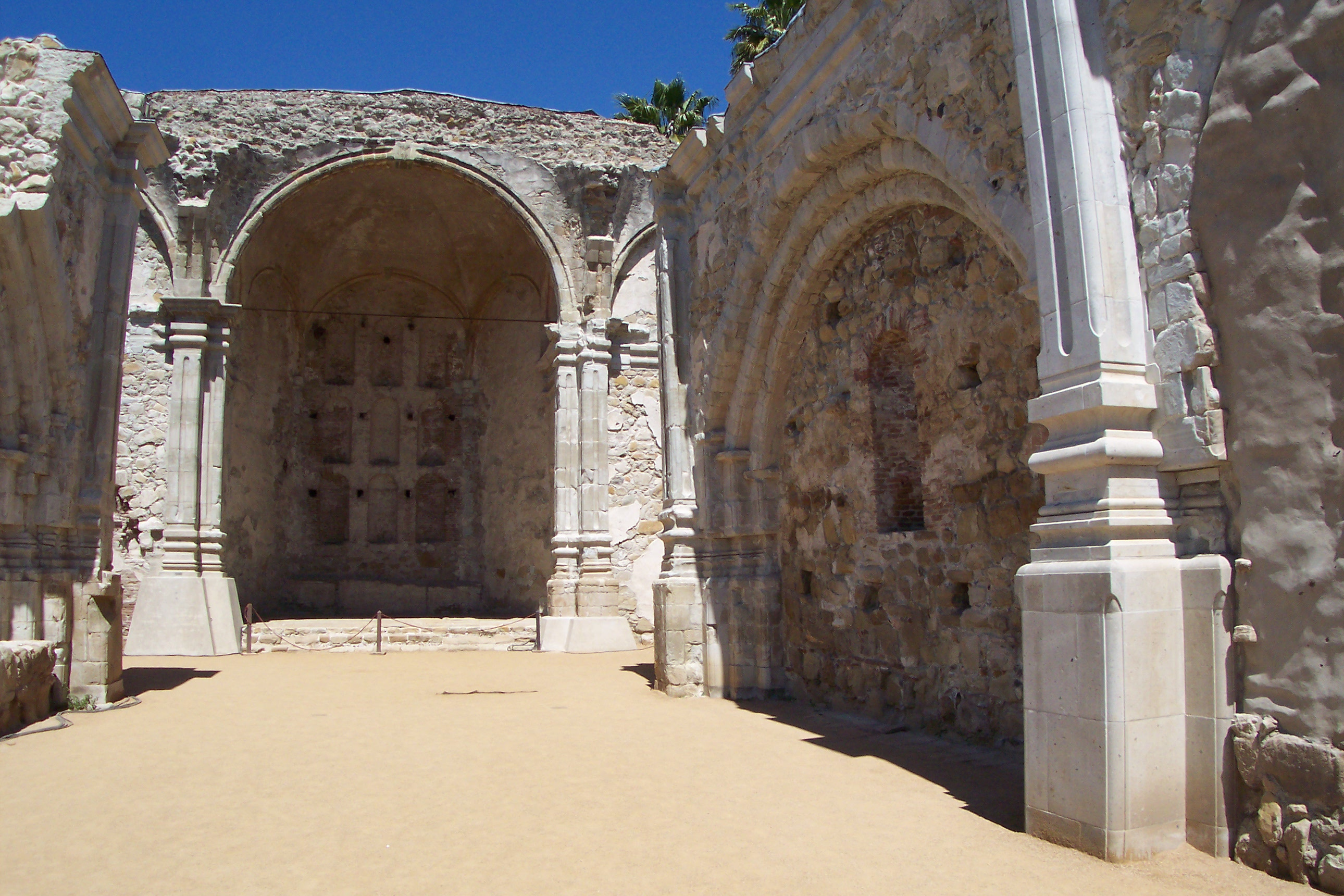
A close-up view of the ruins of Mission San Juan Capistrano's "Great Stone Church," dubbed by architects the "American Acropolis" in reference to its classical Greco-Roman style. "The most important and pretentious building of the whole Mission period ..." was modeled after the Byzantine cathedrals scattered throughout Europe and Western Asia.

==== The Great Stone Church ====
Work was begun on "The Great Stone Church" (the only chapel building in Alta California not constructed out of adobe) on February 2, 1797. It was laid out in the shape of a cross, measuring 180 feet (55 m) long by 40 feet (12 m) wide with 50-foot (15 m) high walls, and included a 120-foot (37 m) tall campanile (bell tower) located adjacent to the main entrance. Local legend has it that the tower could be seen for ten miles (16 km) or more, and that the bells could be heard from even farther away. The sandstone building sat on a foundation seven feet thick. Construction efforts required the participation of the entire neophyte population. Stones were quarried from gullies and creek beds up to six miles (9.7 km) away and transported in carts (carretas) drawn by oxen, carried by hand, and even dragged to the building site. Limestone was crushed into a powder on the Mission grounds to create a mortar that was more erosion-resistant than the actual stones.

On the afternoon of November 22, 1800, tremors from the 6.5-magnitude San Diego earthquake cracked the walls of the rising edifice, necessitating that repair work be performed. Unfortunately, Señor Aguilár died six years into the project; his work was carried on by the priests and their charges, who made their best attempts to emulate the existing construction. Lacking the skills of a master mason, however, led to irregular walls and necessitated the addition of a seventh roof dome. The church was finally completed in 1806, and blessed by Fray Estévan Tapís on the evening of September 7; a two-day-long fiesta followed. The sanctuary floors were paved with diamond-shaped tiles, and brick-lined niches displayed the statues of various saints. It was by all accounts the most magnificent in all of California and a three-day feast was held in celebration of this monumental achievement.

On the morning of December 8, 1812, the "Feast Day of the Immaculate Conception of the Blessed Virgin", a series of large earthquakes shook Southern California during the first Sunday service. The 7.5-magnitude San Juan Capistrano earthquake racked the doors to the church, pinning them shut. When the ground finally stopped shaking, the bulk of the nave had come crashing down, and the bell tower was obliterated. Forty native worshipers who were attending Mass and two boys who had been ringing the bells in the tower were buried under the rubble and lost their lives, and were subsequently interred in the Mission cemetery. This was the second major setback the outpost had suffered, and followed severe storms and flooding that had damaged Mission buildings and ruined crops earlier in the year.

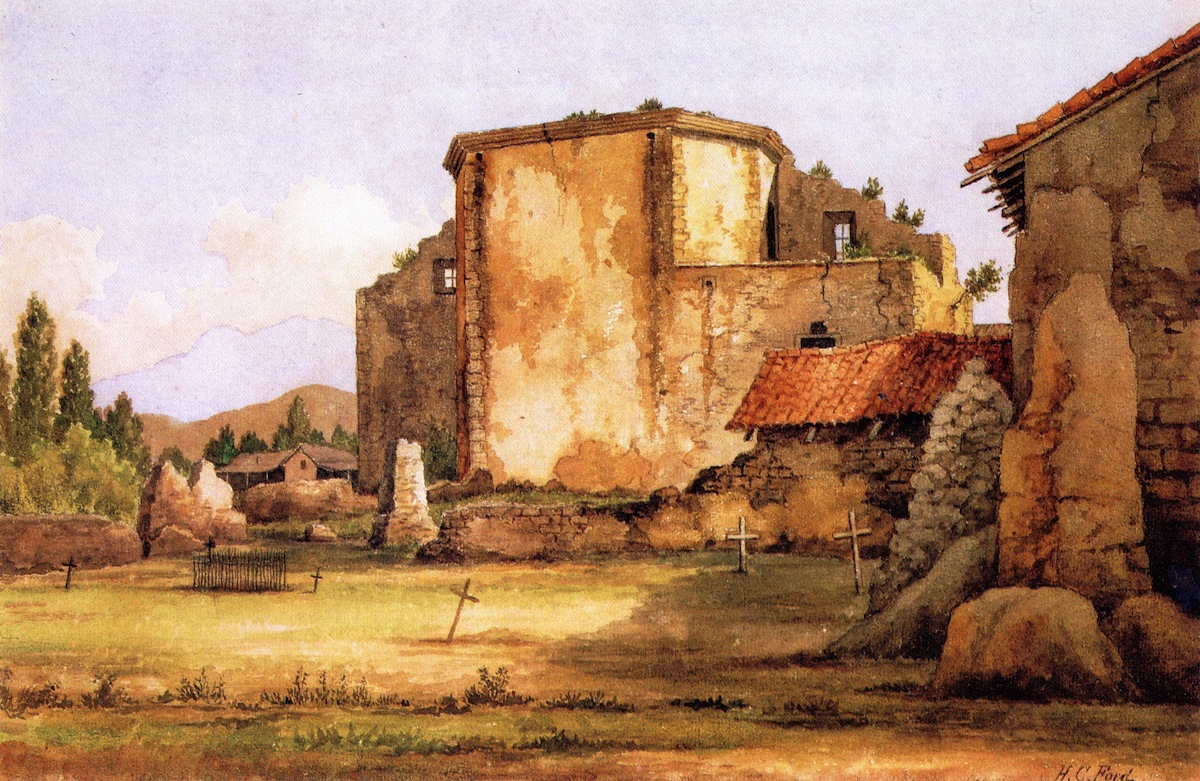
Misión San Juan de Capistrano by Henry Chapman Ford, 1880. The work depicts the rear of the ruined "Great Stone Church" as well as part of the mission's campo santo. A portion of "Serra's Church" is also visible at right. Oil on canvas.

The priests immediately resumed holding services in Serra's Church. Within a year a brick campanario ("bell wall") had been erected between the ruins of the stone church and the Mission's first chapel to support the four bells salvaged from the rubble of the campanile. As the transept, sanctuary (re-do's), and sacristia (sacristy) were all left standing, an attempt was made to rebuild the stone church in 1815 which failed due to a lack of construction expertise (the latter is the only element that is completely intact today). Consequently, all of the construction work undertaken at the Mission grounds thereafter was of a strictly utilitarian nature. José Barona and Boscana oversaw the construction of a small infirmary (hospital) building (located just outside the northwestern corner of the quadrangle) in 1814, "for the convenience of the sick." It is here that Juaneño medicine men used traditional methods to heal the sick and injured. Archaeological excavations in 1937 and 1979 unearthed what are believed to be the building's foundations.

==== The Day That Pirates Sacked The Mission ====
On December 14, 1818, the French privateer Hipólito Bouchard, sailing under the flag of the "United Provinces of Rio de la Plata" (Argentina), brought his ships La Argentina and Santa Rosa to within sight of the Mission; aware that Bouchard (today known as "California's only pirate") had recently conducted raids on the settlements at Monterey and Santa Barbara, Comandante Ruíz had sent forth a party of thirty men (under the leadership of a young Spanish lieutenant named Santiago Argüello) to protect the Mission at first news of the approach on the 13th. Two members of Bouchard's contingent made contact with the garrison soldiers and made their demand for provisions, which was rebuffed with added threats: Lieutenant Argüello replied that if the ships did not sail away the garrison would gladly provide "an immediate supply of shot and shell". In response, "Pirata Buchar" (as he was referred to by the Californios) ordered an assault on the Mission, sending some 140 men and two or three violentos (light howitzer cannon) to take the needed supplies by force. The Mission guards engaged the attackers but were overwhelmed; the marauders looted the Mission warehouses and left minor damage to several Mission buildings in their wake, and reportedly set fire to a few of the outlying straw houses. Reinforcements from Santa Barbara and Los Angeles, led by Comandante Guerra from El Presidio Real de Santa Bárbara, arrived the next day to no avail as the ships had already set sail.

Though the mission was spared, all ammunition, supplies and valuables in the area were taken. Regarded today as one of the more colorful events in the Mission's history, an annual celebration is held to memorialize "The Day that Pirates Sacked the Mission."

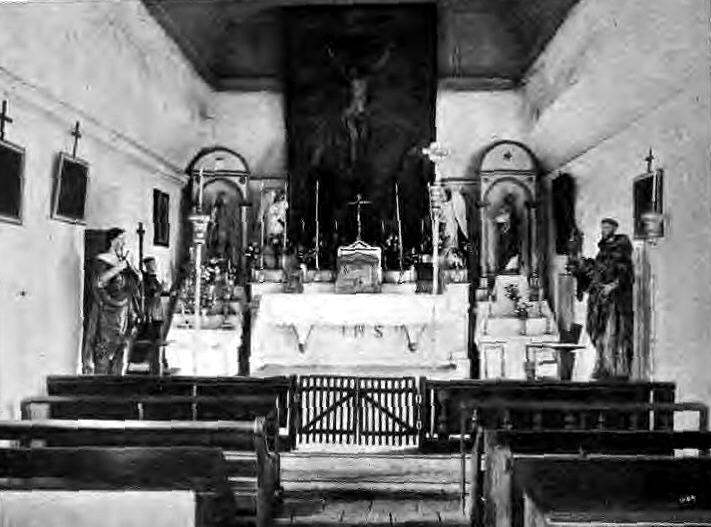
The sanctuary in "Serra's Chapel" (the former "sala") as it looked prior to its being enlarged in 1922. The building is the only extant structure wherein it has been documented that Serra celebrated Mass, and is the oldest building in California in continuous use.

==== Mexican independence ====
Mexico gained its independence from Spain in 1821. The 1820s and 30s saw a gradual decline in the Mission's status. Disease thinned out the once ample cattle herds, and a sudden infestation of mustard weed made it increasingly difficult to cultivate crops. Floods and droughts took their toll as well. But the biggest threat to the Mission's stability came from the presence of Spanish settlers who sought to take over Capistrano's fertile lands. Over time the disillusioned Indian population gradually left the Mission, and without regular maintenance its physical deterioration continued at an accelerated rate. Nevertheless, there was sufficient activity along El Camino Real to justify the construction of the Las Flores Asistencia in 1823. This facility, situated halfway between San Juan Capistrano and the Mission at San Luis Rey, was intended to act primarily as a rest stop for traveling clergy. Around 1820 an estancia (station) was established a few miles north on the banks of the Santa Ana River to accommodate the Mission's sizeable cattle herd. The adobe structure built to house the mayordomo and vaqueros (cowboys) who tended the Mission herds is known today as the Diego Sepúlveda Adobe. Upon his death in 1825, Don José Antonio Yorba I (a prominent Spanish land owner and member of the Portolà Expedition), was buried in the Mission's cemetery in an unmarked grave; a cenotaph was later placed in Yorba's honor.

José María de Echeandía, the first native Mexican to be elected Governor of Alta California, issued his "Proclamation of Emancipation" (or "Prevenciónes de Emancipacion") on July 25, 1826. All Indians within the military districts of San Diego, Santa Barbara, and Monterey who were found qualified were freed from missionary rule and made eligible to become Mexican citizens; those who wished to remain under mission tutelage were exempted from most forms of corporal punishment. Catholic historian Zephyrin Engelhardt referred to Echeandía as "...an avowed enemy of the religious orders." Despite the fact that Echeandía's emancipation plan was met with little encouragement from the neophytes who populated the southern missions, he was nonetheless determined to test the scheme on a large scale at Mission San Juan Capistrano. To that end, he appointed a board of comisianados (commissioners) to oversee the emancipation of the Indians. In response to the proclamation, Barona refused to take the oath of allegiance to what he saw as the "bogus republic of Mexico" despite the fact that he, along with all but two of the other Spanish missionaries, had previously sworn to the Independence of Mexico. The Mexican government passed legislation on December 20, 1827, that mandated the expulsion of all Spaniards younger than sixty years of age from Mexican territories; Governor Echeandía nevertheless intervened on Barona's behalf in order to prevent his deportation once the law took effect in California.

Even before Mexico had gained its independence, the Mission had begun its decline. Although Governor José Figueroa (who took office in 1833) initially attempted to keep the mission system intact, the Mexican Congress passed An Act for the Secularization of the Missions of California on August 17, 1833. The Act also provided for the colonization of both Alta and Baja California, the expenses of this latter move to be borne by the proceeds gained from the sale of the mission property to private interests. Mission San Juan Capistrano was the very first to feel the effects of this legislation the following year when, on August 9, 1834, Governor Figueroa issued his "Decree of Confiscation."

=== Rancho Period (1834–1849) ===
On November 22, 1834, commissioner Juan José Rocha formally acknowledged receipt of the Decree of Confiscation. The final inventory for Mission San Juan Capistrano was compiled by José Maria de Zalvidea and four of the commissioners, and included:

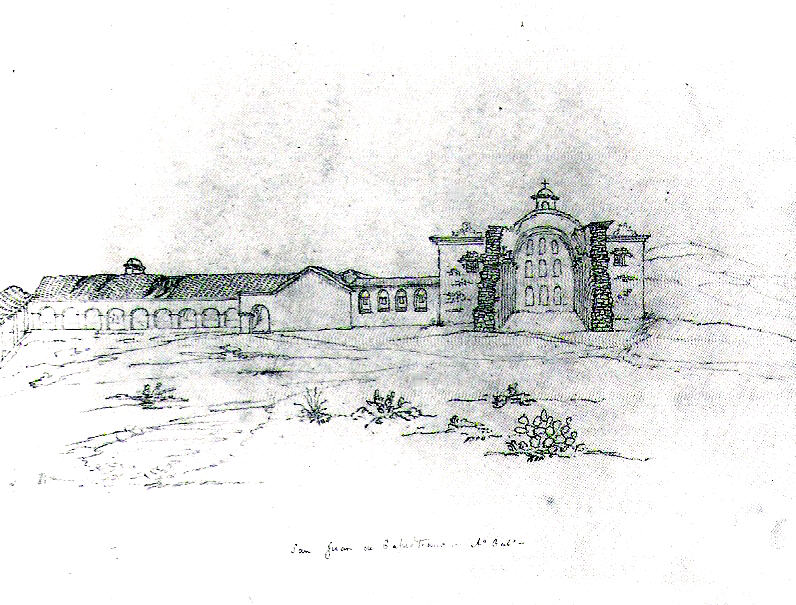
A pencil sketch of Mission San Juan Capstrano drawn by H.M.T. Powell in 1850 shows the domes over the sanctuary and transept, and much of the side walls, as being intact at the time. The rendition omits the mounds of rubble that would have been present at the time of Powell's visit. The structure was reduced very nearly to its present state during the 1860s in a misguided attempt to restore the edifice to its original glory The picture shows that more of the Great Stone Church survived the quake than what is presently standing.

- buildings ($7,298);
- chapel ($1,250);
- furnishings, tools, and implements ($14,768);
- contents of chapel and sacristy ($15,568);
- ranchos of San Mateo and Mission Viejo ($12,019); and
- library holdings ($490)

for a total valuation of $54,456. Mission credits totaled $13,123 while debts equaled a mere $1,410. The Mission library included three volumes of Juan de Torquemada and twelve volumes of the Año Cristiano. The names of 2,000 neophytes were carried on the Mission rolls. Mission agricultural holdings for that year consisted of:

- 8,000 head of cattle;
- 4,000 sheep;
- 80 pigs;
- 50 horses;
- 9 mules;
- 150 fanegas of maize;
- 20 fanegas of beans; and
- 50 barrels of wine and brandy.

Thereafter, the Franciscans all but abandoned the Mission, taking with them most everything of value, after which the locals plundered many of the Mission buildings for construction materials. According to Bancroft, "The population of San Juan Capistrano in 1834 had decreased to 861 souls, and in 1840 it was probably less than 500 with less than 100 at the pueblo proper; while in its crops San Juan (Capistrano) showed a larger deterioration than any other (missionary) establishment." By 1835, little of the Mission's assets remained, though the manufacture of hides and tallow continued in full swing as described in Richard Henry Dana's classic novel Two Years Before the Mast. The Mission was declared to be "in a ruinous state" and the Indian pueblo dissolved in 1841. San Juan Capistrano was officially designated by Governor Juan B. Alvarado as a secular Mexican town on July 29, at which time those few who still resided at the Mission were granted sections of land to use as their own. Following this change in status, the area around the Mission began to decay rapidly; Santiago Argüello (then prefect of the southern District of Los Angeles) complained to the Commandant of the Presidio of Santa Barbara, Don José de la Guerra y Noriega, that "...the unfortunate missions of San Gabriel and San Juan Capistrano [have] been converted into brothels of the mayordomos.

Four years later, the Mission property was auctioned off under questionable circumstances for $710 worth of tallow and hides (equivalent to $15,000 in 2004 dollars) to Englishman John (Don Juan) Forster (Governor Pío Pico's brother-in-law, whose family would take up residence in the friars' quarters for the next twenty years) and his partner James McKinley. More families would subsequently take up residence in other portions of the Mission buildings. José María Zalvidea left San Juan Capistrano on or about November 25, 1842, when Mission San Luis Rey de Francia's Ibarra died, leaving the Mission without a resident priest for the first time (Zalvidea had been the Mission's sole priest ever since the death of Josef Barona in 1831.) The first secular priest to take charge of the mission, Reverend José Maria Rosáles, arrived on October 8, 1843; Vicente Pascual Oliva, the last resident missionary, died on January 2, 1848.

=== California statehood (1850–1900) ===
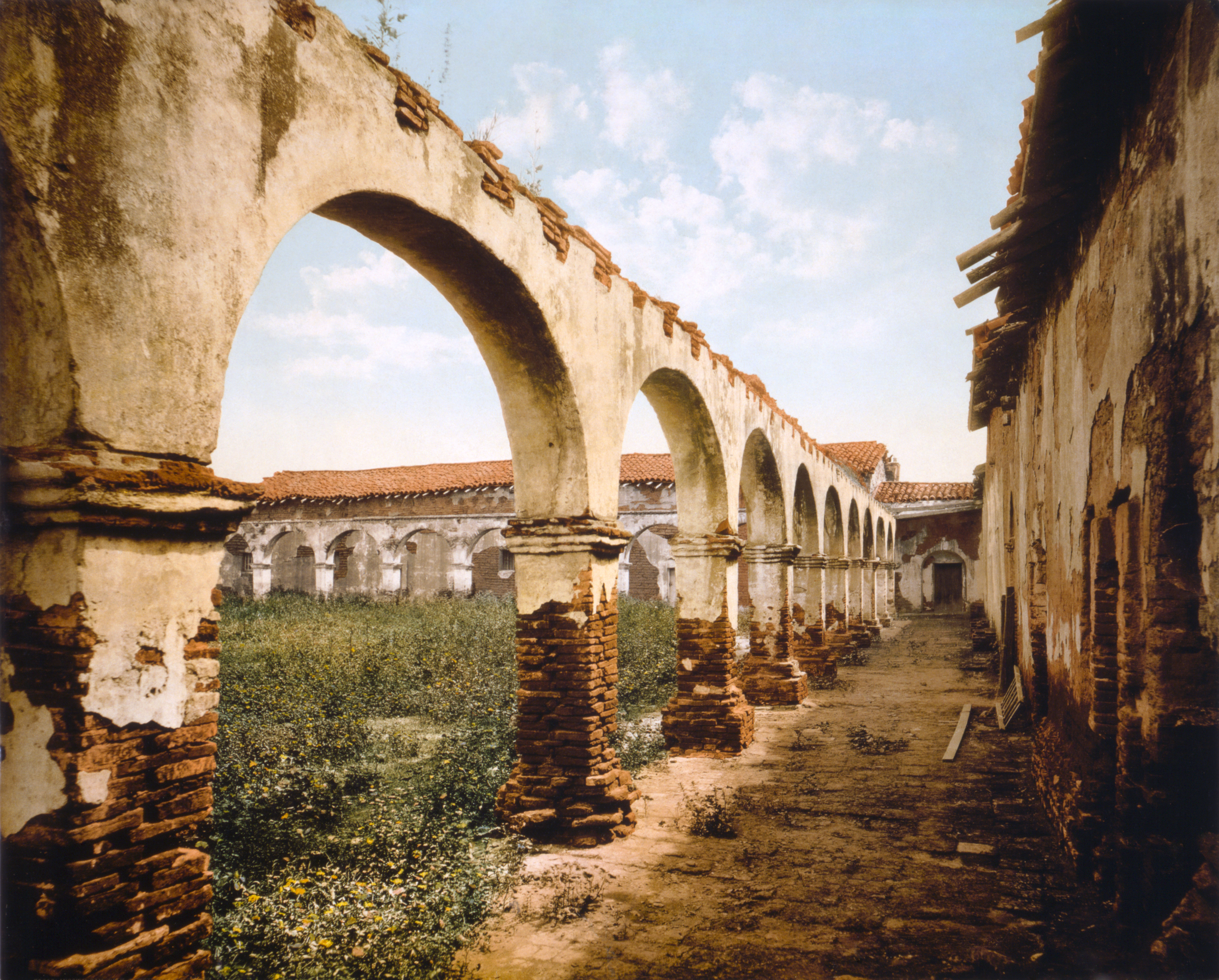
Mission San Juan Capistrano, photochrom print by William Henry Jackson c. 1899

Because virtually all of the artwork at the missions served either a devotional or didactic purpose, there was no underlying reason for the mission residents to record their surroundings graphically; visitors, however, found them to be objects of curiosity. During the 1850s a number of artists found gainful employment as draftsmen attached to expeditions sent to map the Pacific coastline and the border between California and Mexico (as well as plot practical railroad routes); many of the drawings were reproduced as lithographs in the expedition reports. The oldest surviving sketch of the Mission, dating back to 1850 and now in the collection of the Bancroft Library, shows that the domes above the stone church's transept, along with the main dome and cupola (lantern house) located above the sanctuary, survived the 1812 earthquake. The earliest known photograph of San Juan Capistrano was taken by German-born artist Edward Vischer in 1860. Even before that time, however, the ruins at San Juan Capistrano and its stone church had been romanticized by landscape painters, writers, and historians. The ruins have been compared to those of Greece and Rome, and have at various times been referred to as the "Alhambra of America," the "American Acropolis," and the "Melrose Abbey of the West." Also in 1860, an abortive attempt at restoring the stone church was the cause of its additional disintegration, forcing the domes over the transept and sanctuary to collapse.

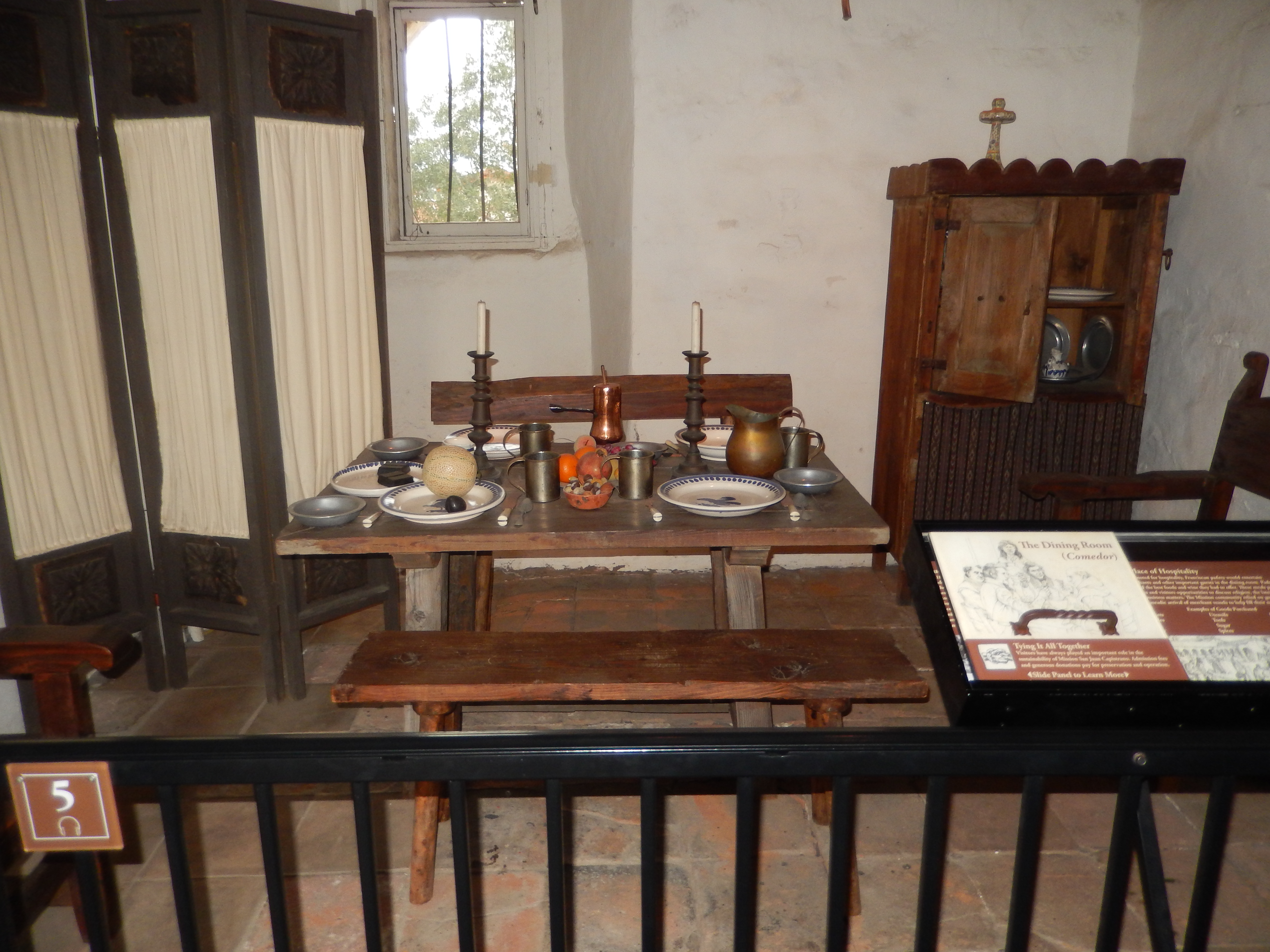
José Mut's dining room as it is thought to have looked during his twenty-year stay at the mission. Some years later, furniture maker and architect Gustav Stickley (the leading spokesperson for the American Arts and Crafts movement) developed a reputation for fine, hand-crafted furnishings that were inspired by pieces such as these.

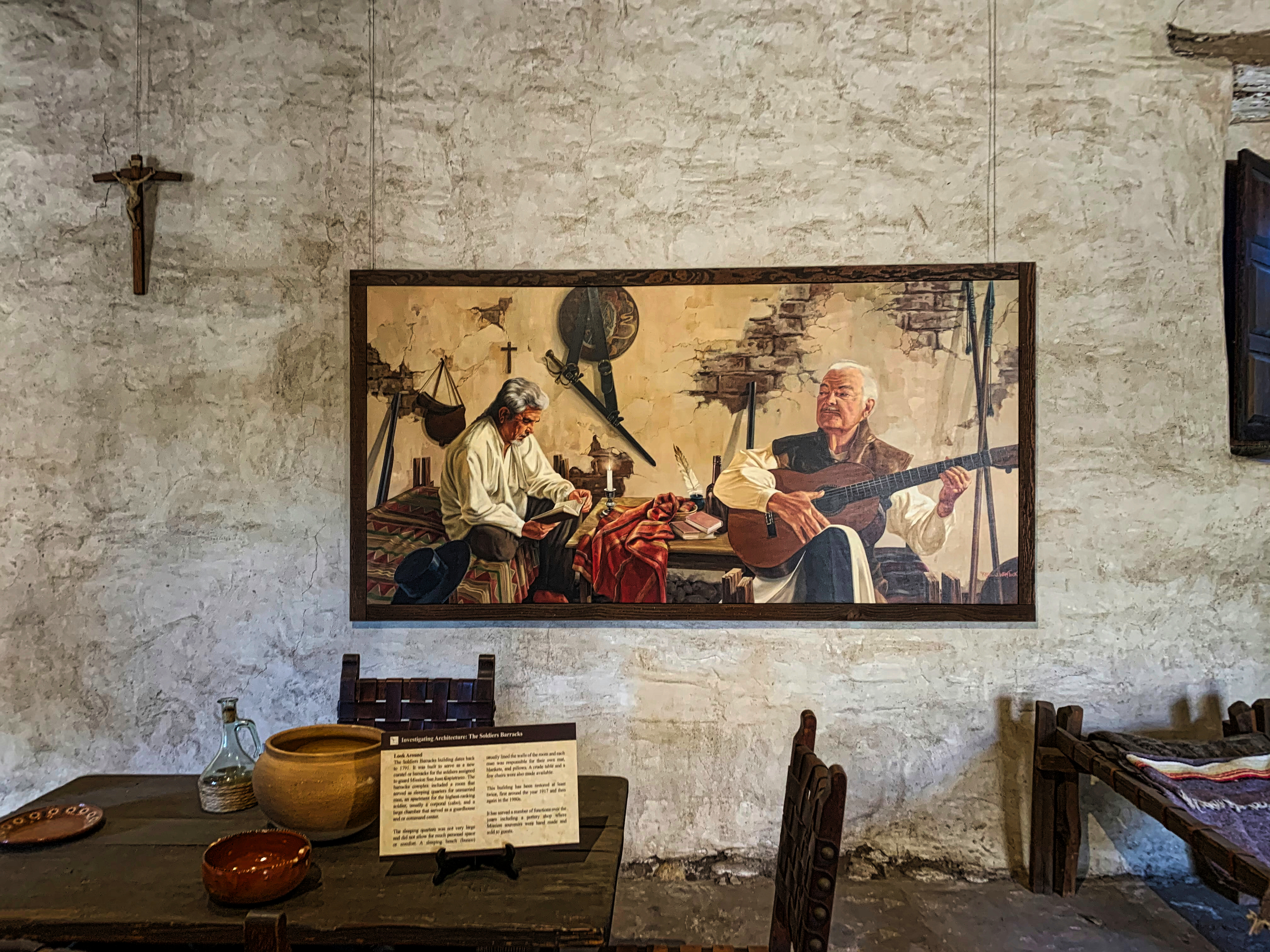
The Soldiers Barracks exhibit

A smallpox epidemic swept through the area in 1862, nearly wiping out the remaining Juaneño Indians. President Abraham Lincoln signed a proclamation on March 18, 1865, that restored ownership of the Mission proper to the Roman Catholic Church. The document remains on display in the Mission's barracks cum museum. Ownership of 44.40 acres (179,700 m^{2}) was conveyed to the Church, for all practical intents being the exact area of land occupied by the original Mission buildings, cemeteries, and gardens. The Mission's sole resident from April 1866, to April 1886, was its pastor, José Mut. Mut made certain changes in order to accommodate his own needs, but little was accomplished to prevent further deterioration of the Mission buildings. Around 1873, some forty Juaneño were still associated with the Mission; however, many of those of mixed Spanish/Mexican and Juaneño heritage were not taken into consideration, and several native villages still existed in the interior valleys. During this same era, the Mission priests established a circuit-riding ministry to these interior villages to the south, and on the other side of the Palomar Mountain Range. A wave of migration by the Juaneño out of San Juan occurred in 1880–1900 as towns in northern Orange County started to form and needed laborers.

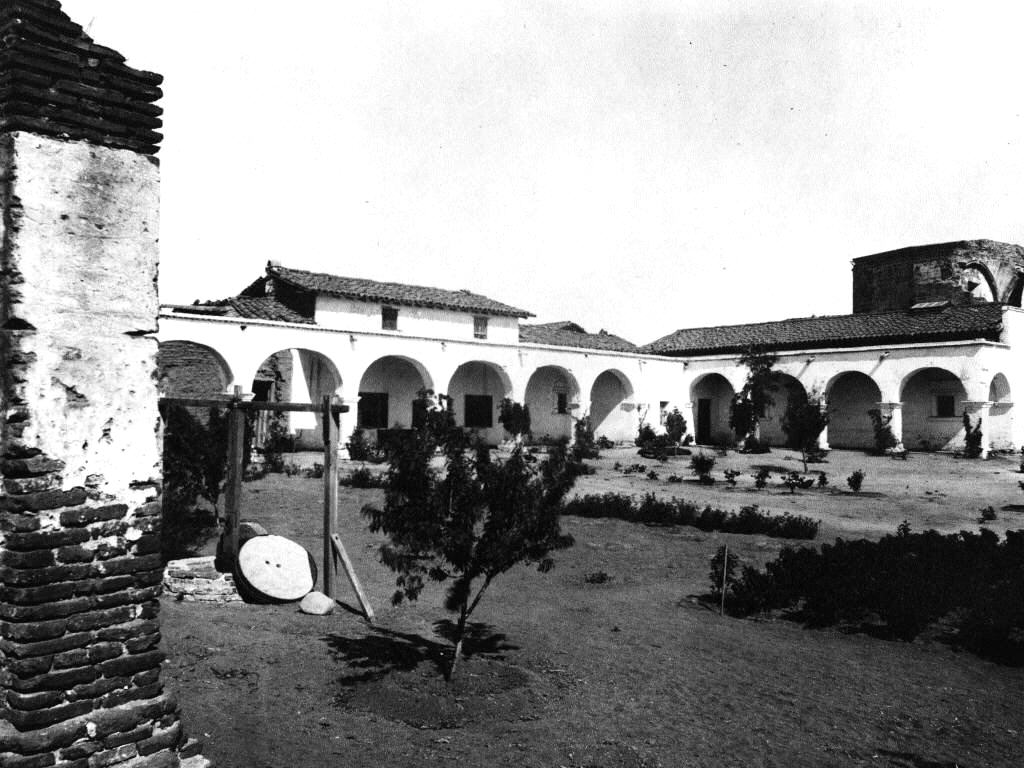
The partially restored plaza at Mission San Juan Capistrano as it appeared around 1896. To the right is the sala, which served as the Mission chapel from 1891 until Serra's chapel was restored in the mid-1920s; the building also housed the Forster family during their time at the Mission. Just left of center is Mut's former residence, including the loft he had constructed.

The 1880s also saw the appearance of a number of articles on the missions in national publications and the first books on the subject; as a result, a large number of artists did one or more mission paintings, though few attempted series. By 1891 a roof collapse required that the Serra Chapel be abandoned completely. Modifications were made to the original adobe church (including the addition of a cross-topped espadaña at the south end, a feature that has been retained in the present iteration of the Mission compound) in order to render it suitable for use as a parish church. In 1894, the Atchison, Topeka and Santa Fe Railway constructed a new depot in the emerging "Mission Revival Style" mere blocks from the Mission. It is rumored that the stonework, bricks, and roof tiles were salvaged from the decaying buildings. The following year, a group calling itself the "Landmarks Club of Southern California" (under the direction of acclaimed American journalist, historian, and photographer Charles Fletcher Lummis) made the first real efforts in over fifty years at preserving the Mission and restoring it to its original state. Over 400 tons of debris was cleared away, holes in the walls were patched, and new shake cedar roofs were placed over a few of the derelict buildings; nearly a mile of walkways were repaved with asphalt and gravel as well.

=== 20th century and beyond (since 1901) ===
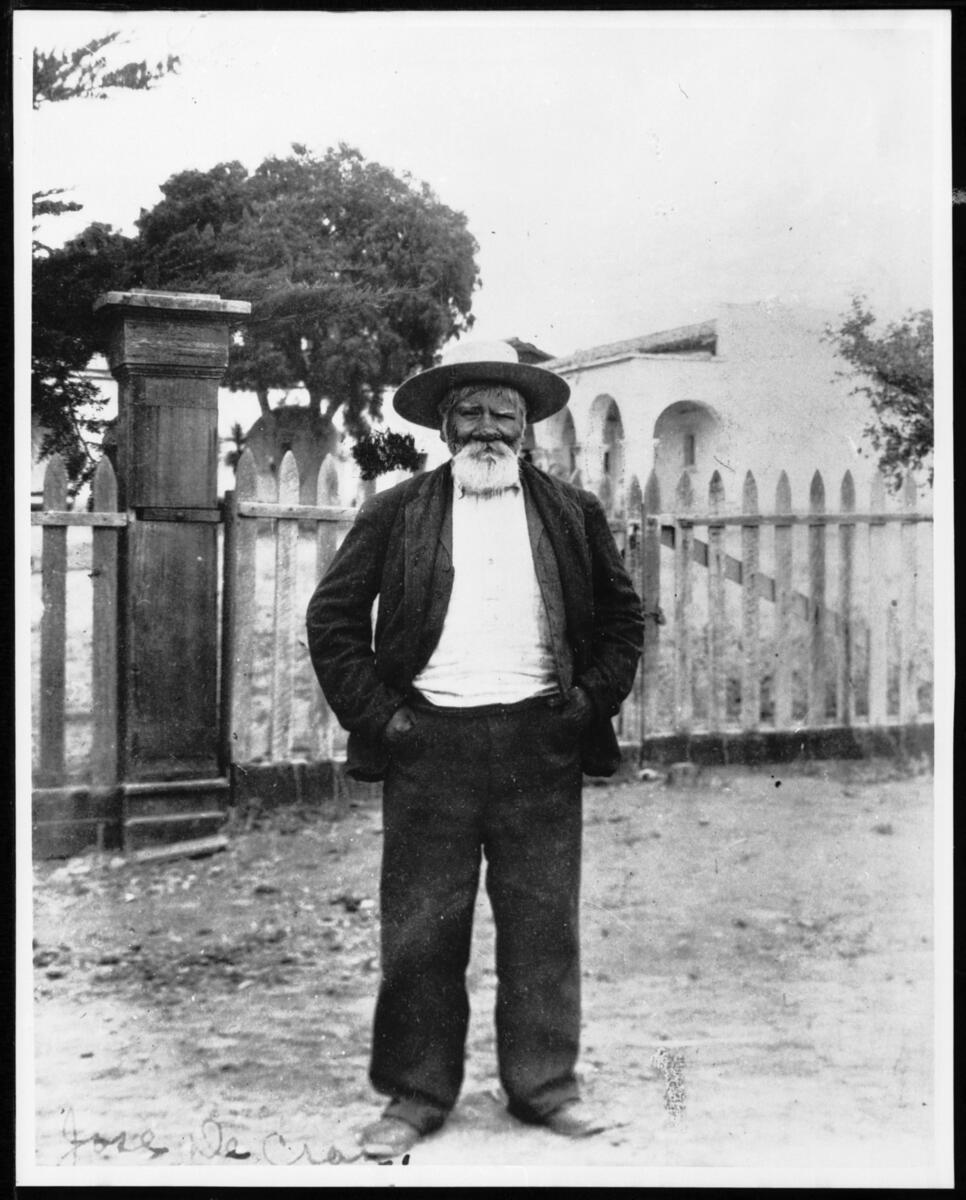
Portrait of José de Grácia Cruz, a San Juan Capistrano Mission Indian bell ringer, ca. June 1909. Source: University of Southern California. Libraries and California Historical Society.

After Mut's departure in 1886 the parish found itself without a permanent pastor, and the Mission languished during this period. St. John O'Sullivan arrived in San Juan Capistrano in 1910 to recuperate from a recent stroke, and to seek relief from chronic tuberculosis. He became fascinated by the scope of the Mission and soon set to work on rebuilding it a section at a time. O'Sullivan's first task was to repair the roof of the Serra Chapel (which was being employed as a granary and storeroom) using sycamore logs to match those that were used in the original work; in the process, the roof of the apse was raised to allow for the inclusion of a window so that natural light could be brought into the space. Other refurbishments were made as time and funds permitted. Arthur B. Benton, a Los Angeles architect, strengthened the chapel walls through the addition of heavy masonry buttresses. The centerpiece of the chapel is its spectacular retablo which serves as the backdrop for the altar. A masterpiece of Baroque art, the altarpiece was hand-carved of 396 individual pieces of cherry wood and overlaid in gold leaf in Barcelona and is estimated to be 400 years old. It was originally imported from Barcelona in 1806 for the Los Angeles cathedral but was never used. It was later donated by Archbishop John Joseph Cantwell of Los Angeles and installed sometime between 1922 and 1924 (the north end of the building had to be enlarged to accommodate this piece due to its height). Although the retablo had been relayered over the centuries, most of the original gilding remains underneath the modern materials (extensive restoration was begun in June 2006).

The first of many Hollywood productions to use San Juan Capistrano as a backdrop was D.W. Griffith's 1910 western film The Two Brothers (the first film ever shot in Orange County). On January 7, 1911, the film's leading lady, silent film star Mary Pickford, secretly wed fellow actor Owen Moore in the Mission chapel. Artist Charles Percy Austin often stayed in San Juan Capistrano and donated several of his works, the most notable being his memorialization of Pickford's wedding ceremony, appropriately entitled Mary Pickford's Wedding, which he painted after O'Sullivan performed the marriage rites. Noted portraitist Joseph Kleitsch also resided at the Mission for a time, and painted a portrait of O'Sullivan in 1924 (among other works). The third and final act of John Steven McGroarty's The Mission Play (1911) is set "...amid the broken and deserted walls of Mission San Juan Capistrano (the Mission of the Swallow), in 1847."

Severe flooding destroyed a portion of the Mission's front arcade in 1915, and heavy storms a year later washed away one end of the barracks building (which O'Sullivan rebuilt in 1917), incorporating minor modifications such as an ornamental archway in order to make the edifice more closely resemble a church. The Mission grounds were enclosed with a wood picket fence, and beginning on May 9, 1916, a ten-cent admission fee was charged to help defray preservation costs. In 1918, the Mission was given parochial status, with O'Sullivan serving as its first modern pastor. It was on April 21 of that year that the San Jacinto Earthquake caused moderate structural damage to some of the buildings. In 1919, author Johnston McCulley created the character "Zorro" and chose Mission San Juan Capistrano as the setting for the first novella, The Curse of Capistrano. In 1920, the "Sacred Garden" was created in the courtyard adjacent to the stone church, and in 1925 the full restoration of the Serra Chapel was completed. O'Sullivan died in 1933 and was interred in the Mission cemetery (campo santo) amongst more than 2,000 former inhabitants (mostly Juaneño Indians), who are buried in unmarked graves. O'Sullivan's tomb lies at the foot of a Celtic cross that O'Sullivan himself erected as a memorial to the Mission's builders.

After O'Sullivan's death, Arthur J. Hutchinson (another pastor with a love of California history) assumed leadership of the Mission, and played a central role in raising needed funds to continue the Mission's preservation work. Pastor Hutchinson made key archeological discoveries on the Mission grounds during his tenure (he died on July 27, 1951), after which time his work was continued by the next two pastors, Monsignors Vincent Lloyd-Russell and Paul M. Martin. In 1937, representatives of the U.S. National Park Service's Historic American Buildings Survey, as a part of the Historic Sites Act of 1935, surveyed and photographed the grounds and structures extensively. Their efforts laid the groundwork for future excavation and reconstruction of the west wing industrial complex. Monsignor Martin began a comprehensive preservation effort following the 1987 Whittier Narrows earthquake.

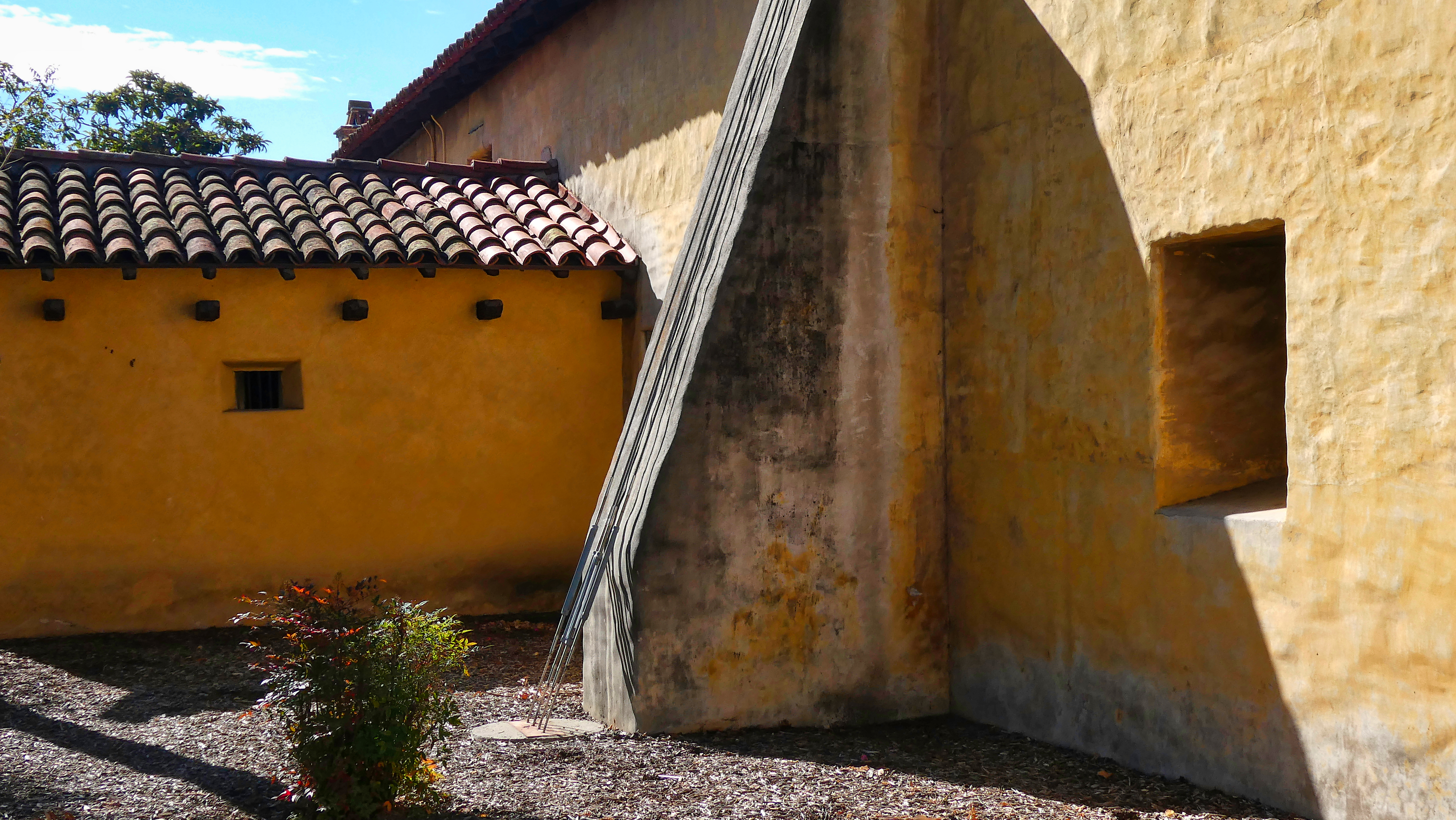
Outer wall - reinforcing rods

The prestigious World Monuments Fund placed "The Great Stone Church" on its List of 100 Most Endangered Sites in 2002. The most recent series of seismic retrofits at the Mission were completed at a cost of $7.5 million in 2004. About half a million visitors, including 80,000 school children, come to the Mission each year.

A number of events are held at the mission today. The main fundraising event, Battle of the Mariachis, has been held since 2004 and started as a way to honor its heritage.

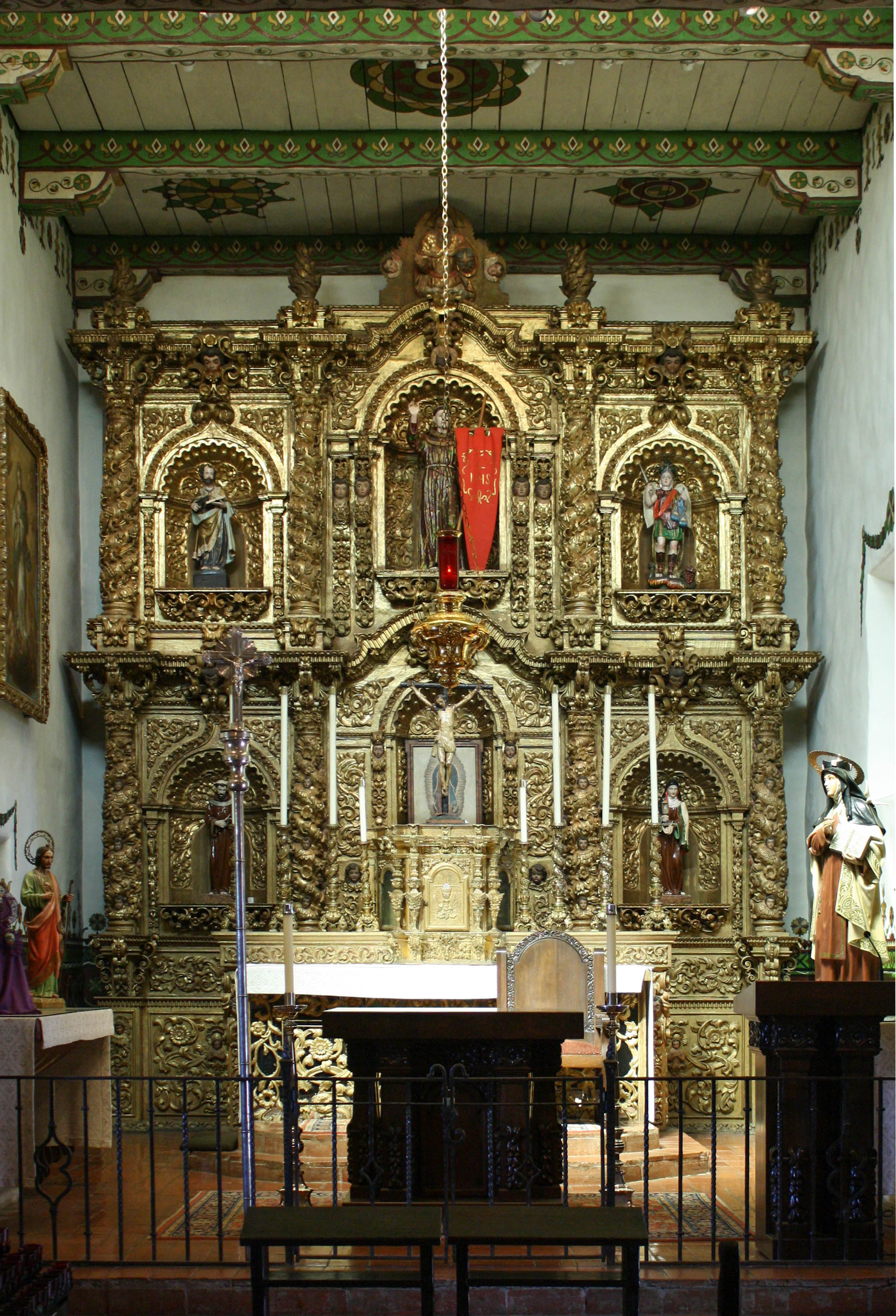
The "Golden Altar", an early Baroque-style retablo (altarpiece) situated at the north-end sanctuary of "Father Serra's Church".

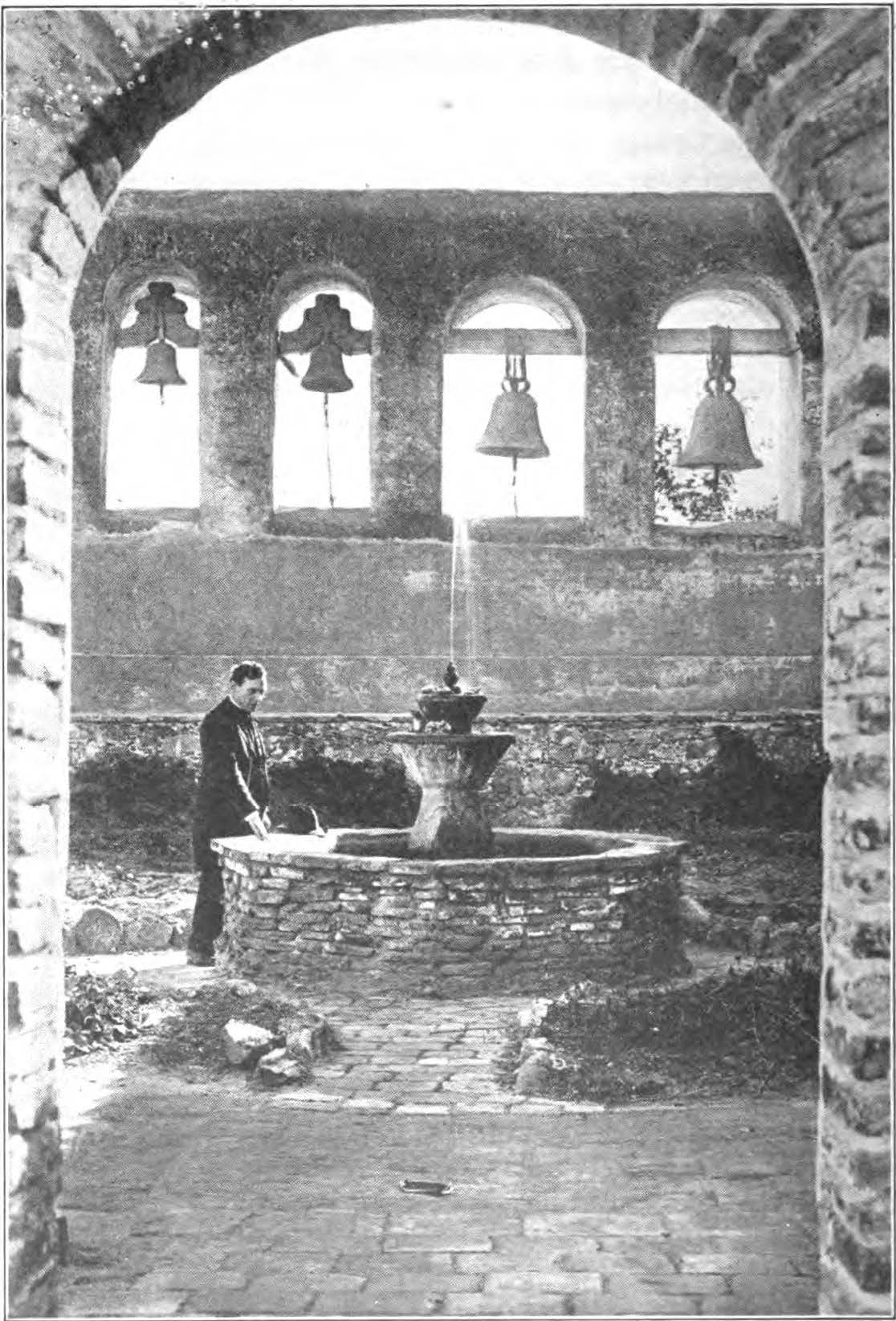
St. John O'Sullivan spends time in Mission San Juan Capistrano's "Sacred Garden".

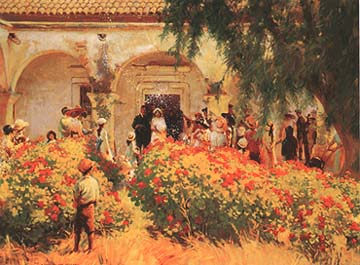
Mary Pickford's Wedding by American artist Charles Percy Austin. Oil on canvas.

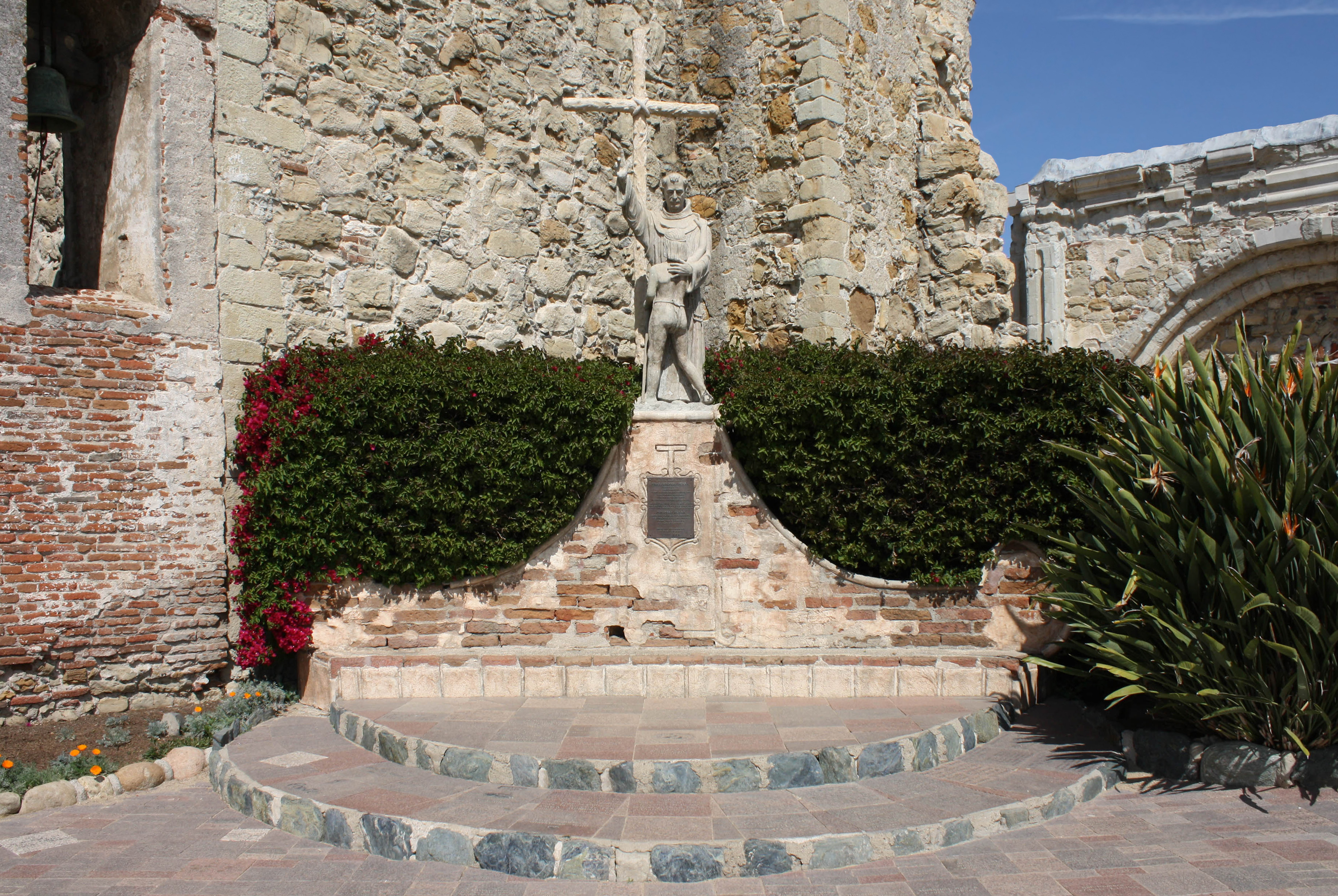
Statue of Junípero Serra in the Mission.

== Other historic designations ==
- California Historical Landmark #227 – Diego Sepúlveda Adobe Estancia
- ASM International Historical Landmark (1988) – "Metalworking Furnaces"
- World Monuments Fund List of 100 Most Endangered Sites (2002); "The Great Stone Church"
- Orange County Historic Civil Engineering Landmark (1992)

== Mission industries ==
The cattle brand used at Mission San Juan Capistrano, as registered with the U.S. Land Surveyor's Office in San Francisco.

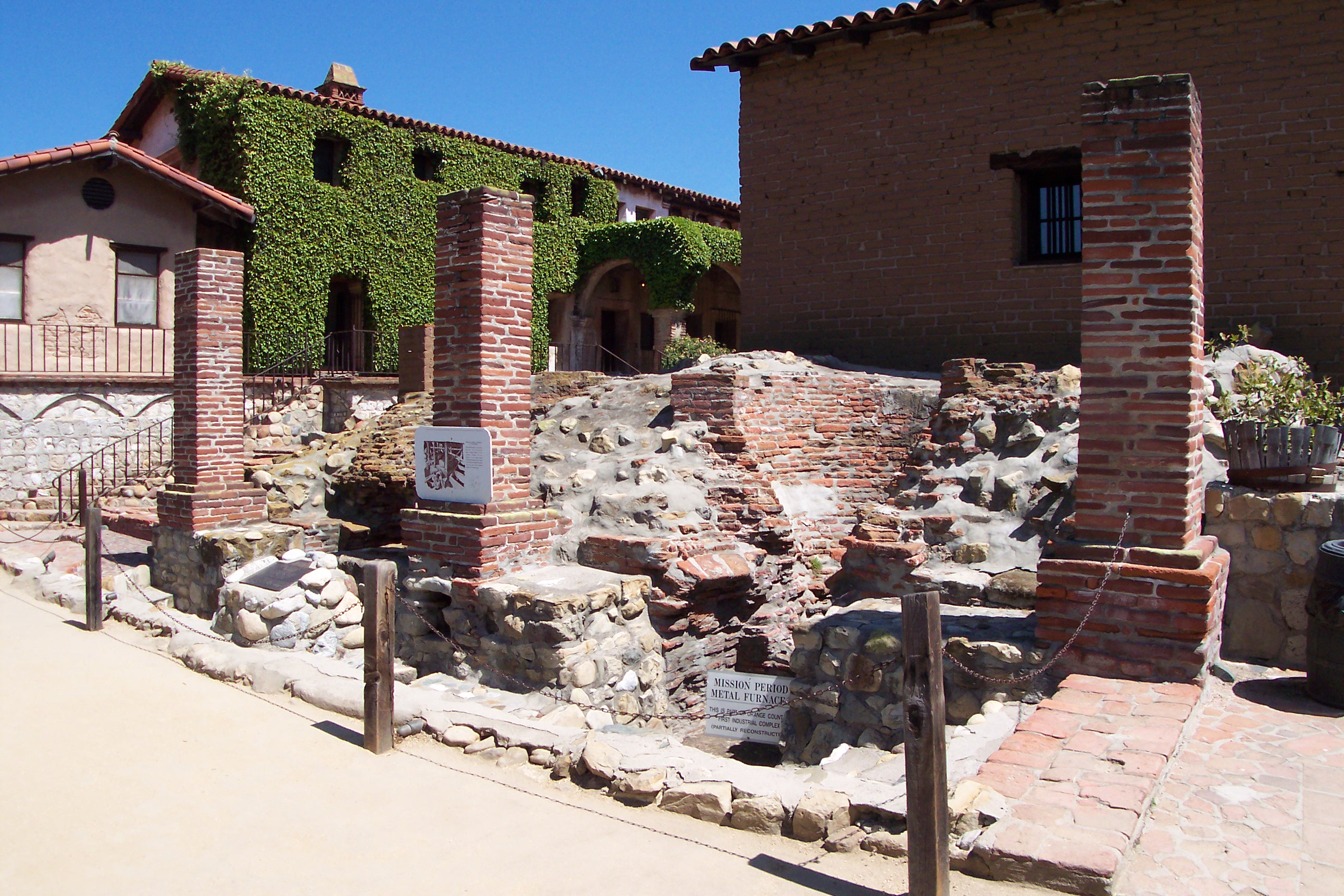
A view of the Catalan forges at Mission San Juan Capistrano, the oldest existing facilities (1790s) of their kind in the State of California. The sign at the lower right-hand corner proclaims the site as being "...part of Orange County's first industrial complex."

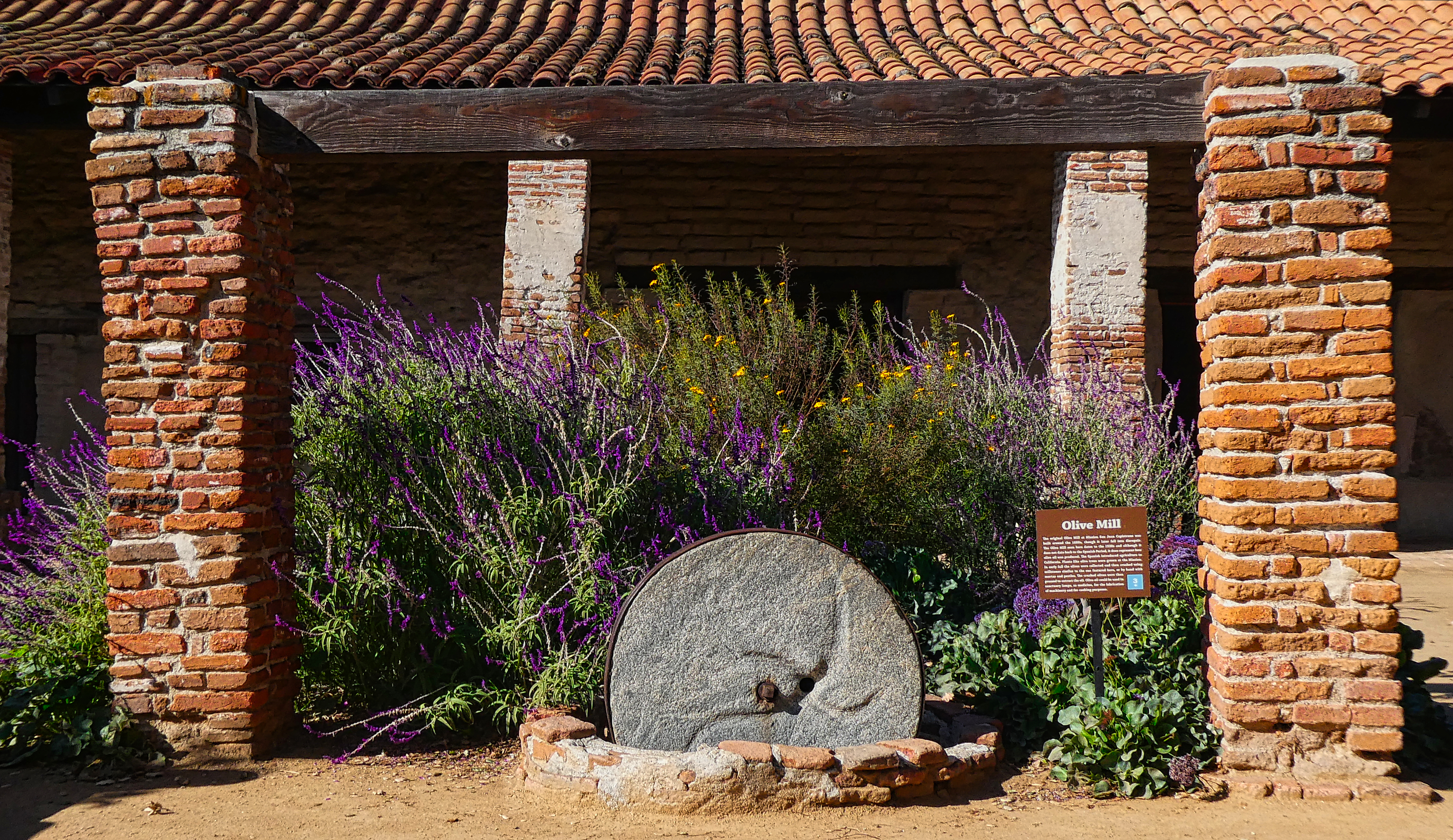
Olive millstone and site of Olive Mill

The goal of the missions was, above all, to become self-sufficient in relatively short order. Farming, therefore, was the most important industry of any mission. Barley, maize, and wheat were the principal crops grown at San Juan Capistrano; cattle, horses, mules, sheep, and goats were all raised by the hundreds as well. In 1790, the Mission's herd included 7,000 sheep and goats, 2,500 cattle, and 200 mules and horses. Olives were grown, cured, and pressed under large stone wheels to extract their oil, both for use at the Mission and to trade for other goods. Grapes were also grown and fermented into wine for sacramental use and again, for trading. The specific variety, called the Criolla or "Mission grape", was first planted at the Mission in 1779; in 1783, the first wine produced in Alta California emerged from San Juan Capistrano's winery. Until about 1850, Mission grapes represented the entirety of viticulture in the state. Cereal grains were dried and ground by stone into flour. The Mission's kitchens and bakeries prepared and served thousands of meals each day. Candles, soap, grease, and ointments were all made from tallow (rendered animal fat) in large vats located just outside the west wing. Also situated in this general area were vats for dyeing wool and tanning leather, and primitive looms for weavings. Large bodegas (warehouses) provided long-term storage for preserved foodstuffs and other treated materials.

Three long zanjas (aqueducts) ran through the central courtyard and deposited the water they collected into large cisterns in the industrial area, where it was filtered for drinking and cooking, or dispensed for use in cleaning. The Mission had to fabricate all of its construction materials as well. Workers in the carpintería (carpentry shop) used crude methods to shape beams, lintels, and other structural elements; more skilled artisans carved doors, furniture, and wooden implements. For certain applications bricks (ladrillos) were fired in ovens (kilns) to strengthen them and make them more resistant to the elements; when tejas (roof tiles) eventually replaced the conventional jacal roofing (densely packed reeds) they were placed in the kilns to harden them as well. Glazed ceramic pots, dishes, and canisters were also made in the Mission's kilns.

Prior to the establishment of the missions, the native peoples' way of life involved the use of bone, seashells, stone, and wood for building, tool making, weapons, and so forth. The missionaries decided that the Indians, who regarded labor as degrading to the masculine sex, had to be taught industry in order to learn how to support their social and economic goals. The result was the establishment of a great manual training school that comprised agriculture, the mechanical arts, and the raising and care of livestock. Everything consumed and otherwise used by the natives was produced at the missions under the supervision of the priests; thus, the neophytes not only supported themselves, but after 1811 sustained the entire military and civil government of California. The foundry at Mission San Juan Capistrano was the first to introduce the Indians to the Iron Age. The blacksmith used the Mission's Catalan furnaces (California's first) to smelt and fashion iron into everything from basic tools and hardware (such as nails) to crosses, gates, hinges, even cannon for Mission defense. Iron was one commodity in particular that the Mission relied solely on trade to acquire, as the missionaries had neither the know-how nor the technology to mine and process metal ores.

== Mission bells ==
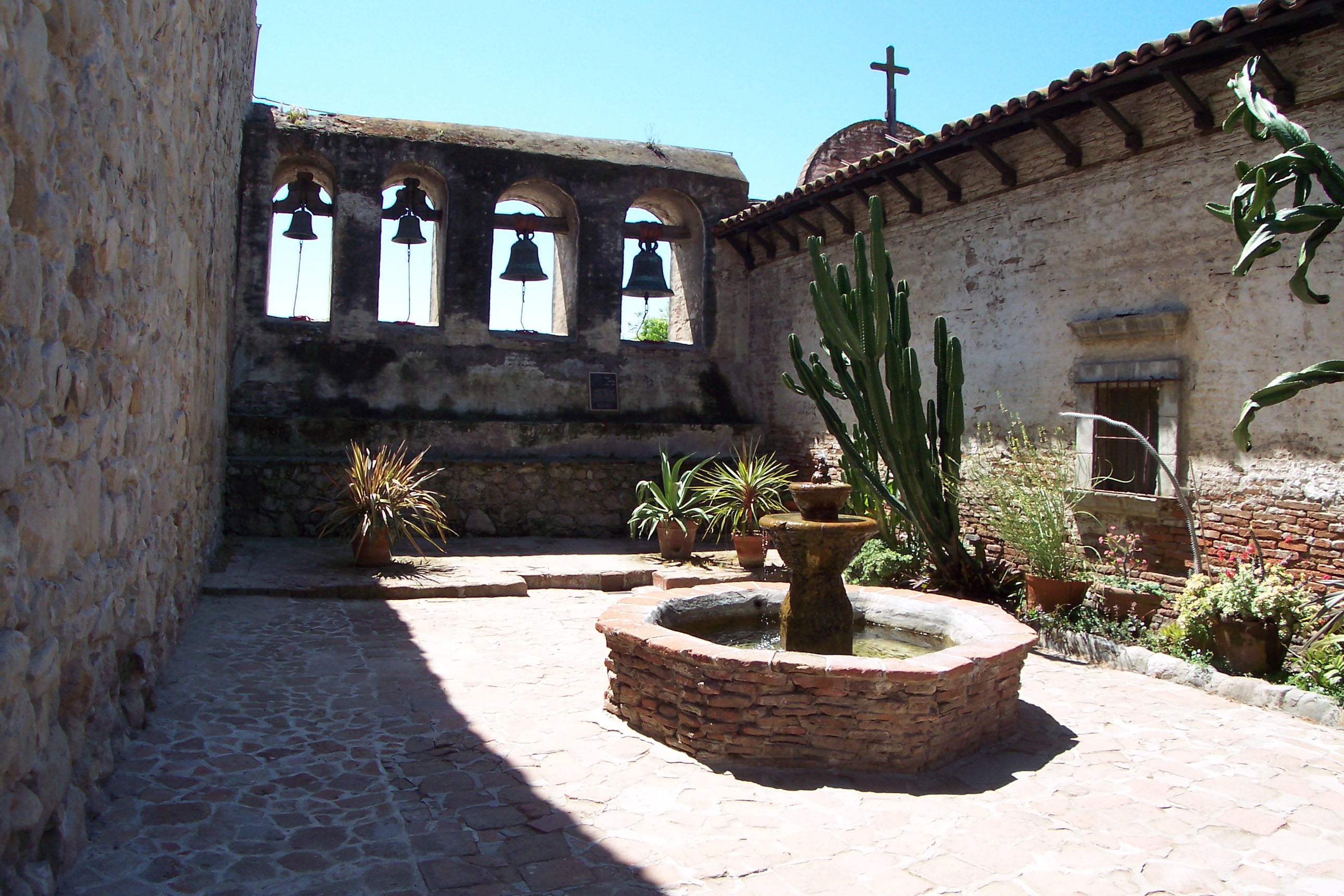
A view of Mission San Juan Capistrano's "Sacred Garden" that was developed in 1920. The four-bell campanario was erected a year after the bell tower at "The Great Stone Church" was toppled in the 1812 earthquake.

A crate label for Mission Bells Brand fruit depicts the ringing of the bells at Mission San Juan Capistrano.

Bells were vitally important to daily life at any mission. The bells were rung at mealtimes, to call the Mission residents to work and to religious services, during births and funerals, to signal the approach of a ship or returning missionary, and at other times; novices were instructed in the intricate rituals associated with the ringing the mission bells. The original bells were hung from a large nearby tree for some fifteen years, until the chapel bell tower was completed in 1791. What ultimately became of the original bells is not known. New bells were cast in Chile for inclusion in the belfry of "The Great Stone Church." All four of Mission San Juan Capistrano's bells are named and all bear inscriptions as follows (from the largest to the smallest; inscriptions are translated from Latin):

- "Praised by Jesus, San Vicente. In honor of the Reverend Fathers, Ministers (of the Mission) Fray Vicente Fustér, and Fray Juan Santiago, 1796."
- "Hail Mary most pure. Ruelas made me, and I am called San Juan, 1796."
- "Hail Mary most pure, San Antonio, 1804."
- "Hail Mary most pure, San Rafael, 1804."

In the aftermath of the 1812 earthquake, the two largest bells cracked and split open. Due to this damage neither produced clear tones. Regardless, they were hung in the campanario that went up the following year. During the Mission's heyday, a lone bell also hung at the west end of the front corridor, next to an entrance gate which has long since eroded away. One of O' Sullivan's companions during his tenure at San Juan Capistrano was José de Gracia Cruz, better known as Acú, who related many stories and legends of the Mission. A descendant of the Juaneño Indians, he served as the Mission's bell ringer until his death in 1924.

On March 22, 1969, President Richard M. Nixon and First Lady Pat Nixon visited the Mission and rang the Bell of San Rafael. A bronze plaque commemorating the event is set in the bell wall. In celebration of the new Mission church being elevated to minor basilica status in 2000, exact duplicates of the damaged bells were cast by Royal Bellfoundry Petit & Fritsen b.v. of Aarle-Rixtel, the Netherlands using molds made from the originals. The replacement bells were placed in the bell wall and the old ones put on display within the footprint of the destroyed Mission campanile ("bell tower").

== Folklore ==
=== Legends ===
The tragedy of "The Great Stone Church" gave rise to its well loved legend, that of a young native girl named Magdalena who was killed in the collapse. Magdalena lived on the Mission grounds and had fallen in love with an artist named Teófilo. However, the pair was deemed too young to marry by their elders and were forced to carry on their relationship in secret. On that terrible December morning, the repentant Magdalena walked ahead of the procession of worshipers carrying a penitent's candle just as the earthquake struck. Teófilo rushed into the church as the walls and roof tumbled to the ground in a vain attempt to save his lover. When the rubble was cleared the pair was found among the dead, locked in a final embrace. It is said that on moonlit nights one can sometimes make out the face of a young girl, seemingly illuminated by candlelight, high up in the ruins. Other, less-pervasive legends include that of a faceless monk who haunted the corridors of the original quadrangle, and of a headless soldier who was often seen standing guard near the front entrance.

=== Return of the swallows ===
The American cliff swallow (Petrochelidon pyrrhonota) is a migratory bird that spends its winters in Goya, Argentina, but makes the 6,000-mile (10,000 km) trek north to the warmer climes of the American Southwest in springtime. According to legend, the birds, who have visited the San Juan Capistrano area every summer for centuries, first took refuge at the Mission when an irate innkeeper began destroying their mud nests (the birds also frequent the Mission San Carlos Borromeo de Carmelo). The Mission's location near two rivers made it an ideal location for the swallows to nest, as there was a constant supply of the insects on which they feed, and the young birds are well-protected inside the ruins of the old stone church.

A 1915 article in Overland Monthly magazine made note of the birds' annual habit of nesting beneath the Mission's eaves and archways from spring through fall, and made the swallows the "signature icon" of the Mission; O'Sullivan used interest in the phenomenon to generate public interest in restoration efforts during his two decades in residence. One of bell ringer Acú's most colorful tales was that the swallows (or las golondrinas, as he called them) flew over the Atlantic Ocean to Jerusalem each winter, carrying small twigs on which they could rest atop the water along the way. On March 13, 1939, a popular radio program was broadcast live from the Mission grounds, announcing the swallows' arrival. Composer Leon René was so inspired by the event that he penned the song "When the Swallows Come Back to Capistrano" in tribute. During its initial release the song spent several weeks atop the Your Hit Parade charts. The song has been recorded by such musicians as The Ink Spots, Fred Waring, Guy Lombardo, Glenn Miller, The Five Satins and Pat Boone. A glassed-off room in the Mission has been designated in René's honor and displays the upright piano on which he composed the tune, the reception desk from his office and several copies of the song's sheet music and other pieces of furniture, all donated by René's family.

Each year the Fiesta de las Golondrinas is held in the City of San Juan Capistrano. Presented by the San Juan Capistrano Fiesta Association, the Fiesta de las Golondrinas is a week-long celebration of this auspicious event culminated by the Swallows Day Parade and Mercado, street fair. Tradition has it that the main flock arrives on March 19 (Saint Joseph's Day), and flies south on Saint John's Day, October 23.

When the swallows come back to Capistrano

That's the day you promised to come back to me
When you whispered, "Farewell," in Capistrano
'twas the day the swallows flew out to sea

— excerpt from "When the Swallows Come Back to Capistrano" by Leon René

In recent years, the swallows have failed to return in large flocks to the Mission. Few birds were counted in the 1990s and 2000s. The reduction has been connected to increased development of the area, including many more choices of nesting place and fewer insects to eat.

=== California pepper tree ===
The largest California pepper tree (Schinus molle) in the United States resided at Mission San Juan Capistrano until 2005, when it was felled due to disease. The 57-foot (17 m) tall specimen, planted in the 1870s, was typical of the early California landscape; it was also listed in the National Register of Big Trees. The oldest pepper tree in California resides in the courtyard of Mission San Luis Rey de Francia.

== Gallery ==
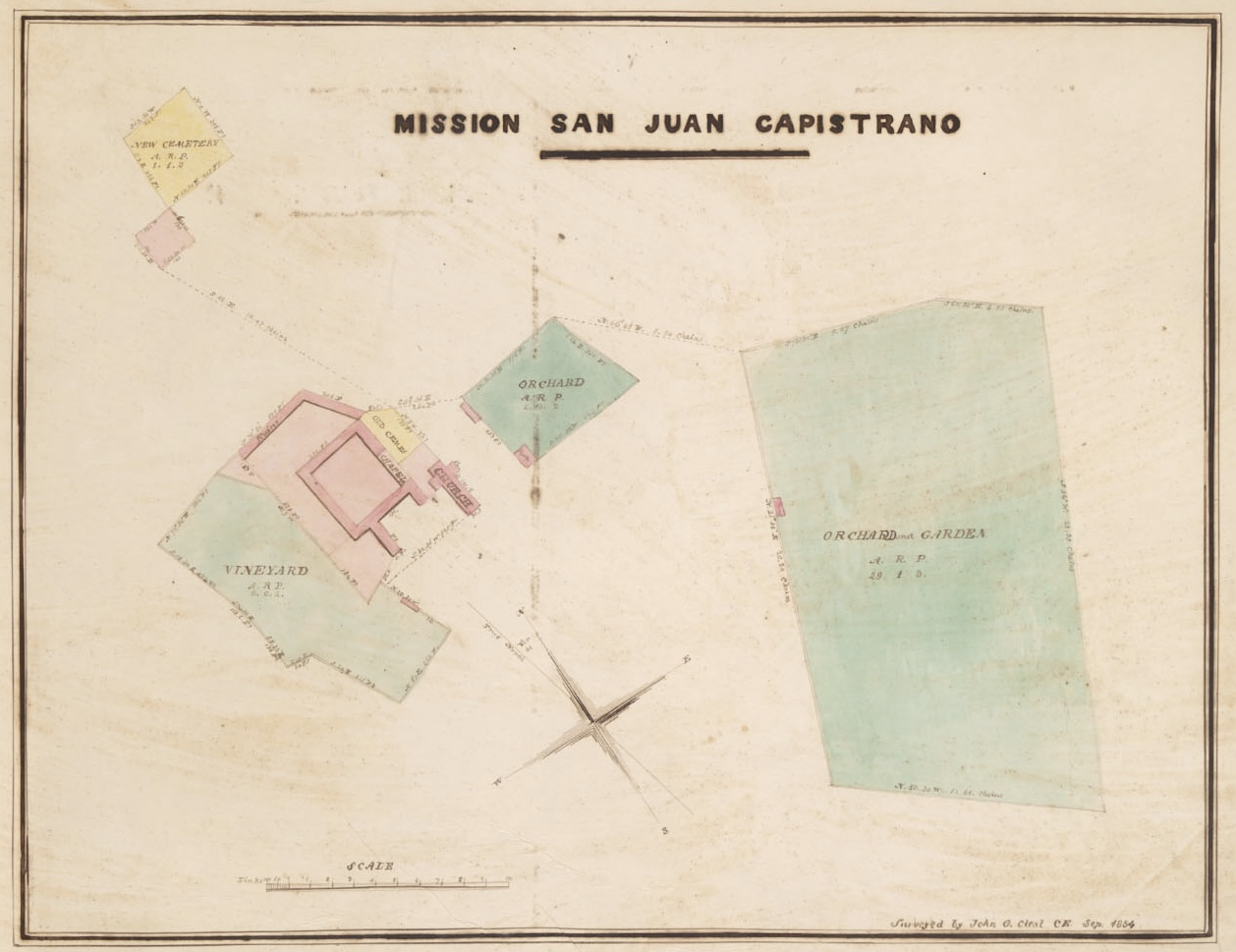
1854 survey of Mission San Juan Capistrano (via Bancroft Library)

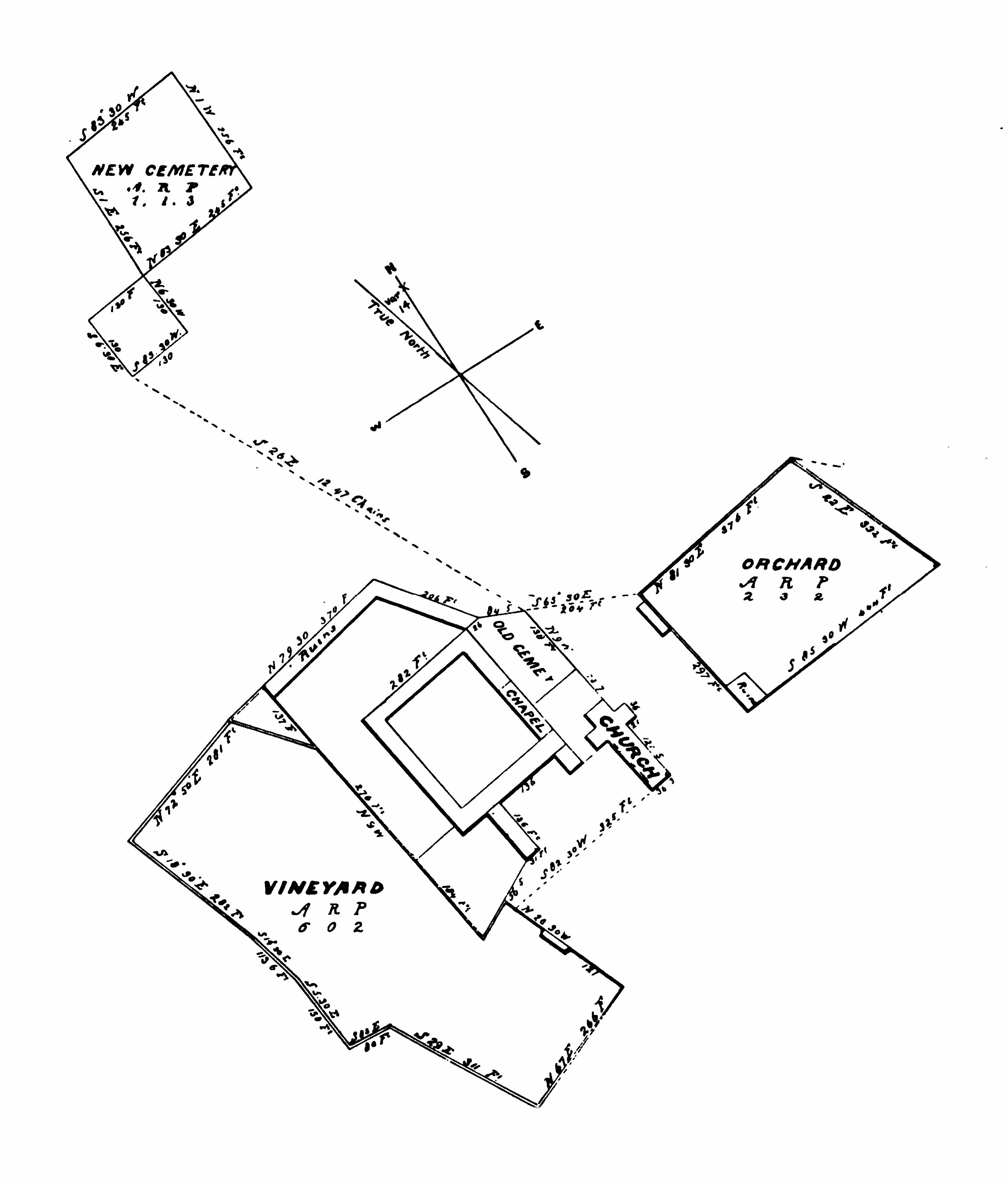
The "Alemany Plat" prepared by the United States General Land Office to define the property restored to the Catholic Church by the Public Land Commission, later confirmed by presidential proclamation on March 18, 1865.

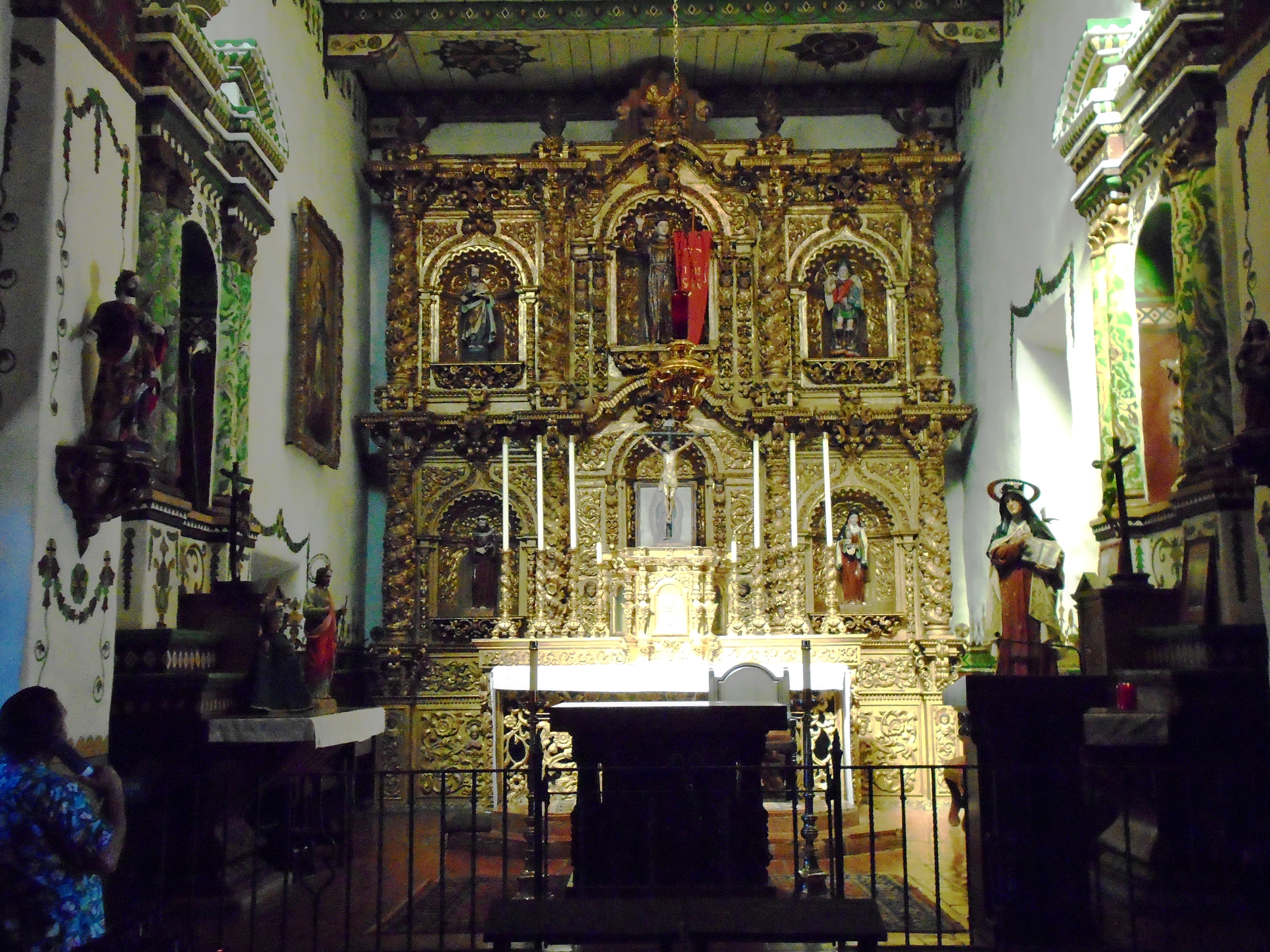
Father Serra Church at the mission (2019)

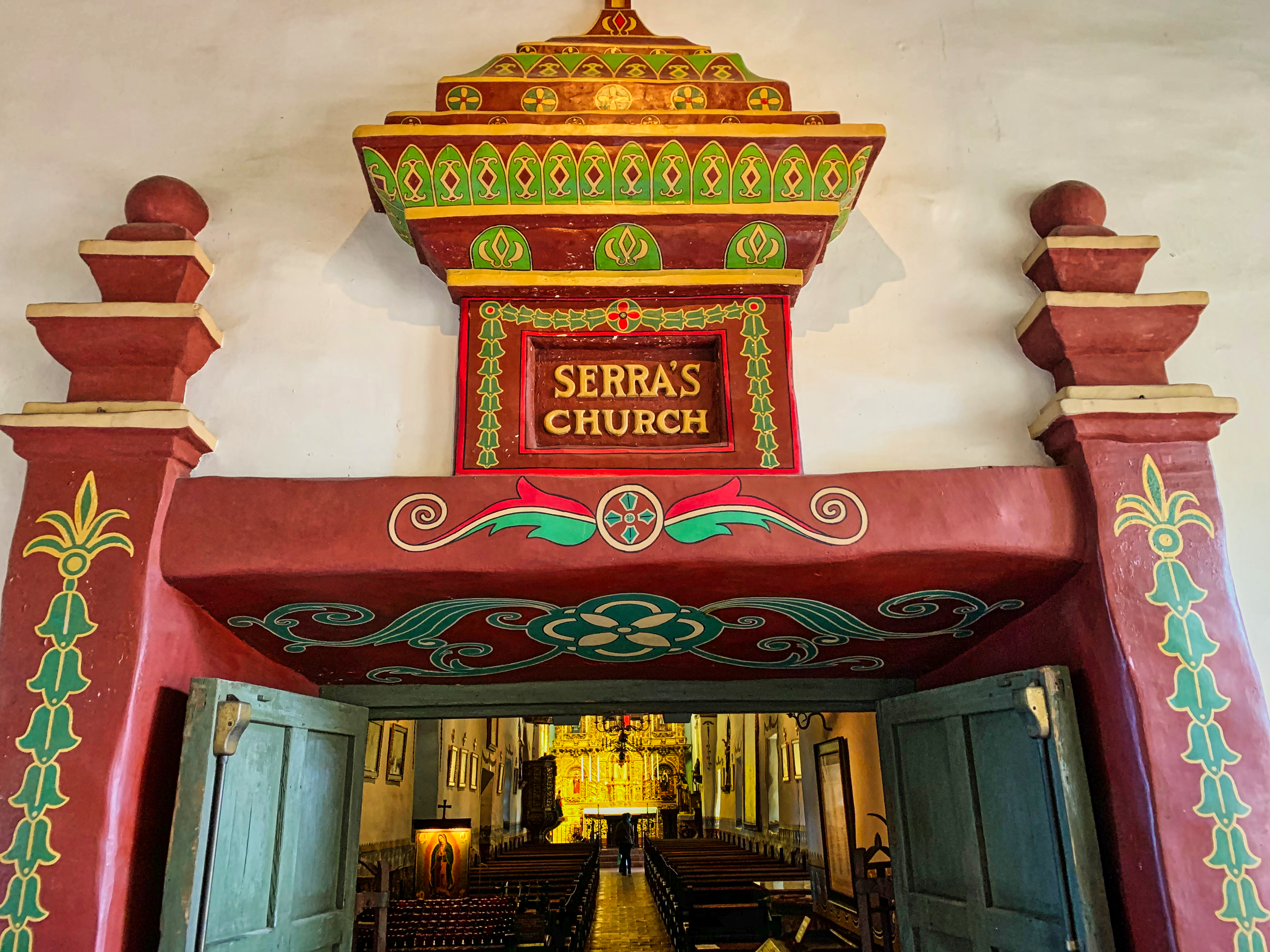
Entrance - Father Serra's Church

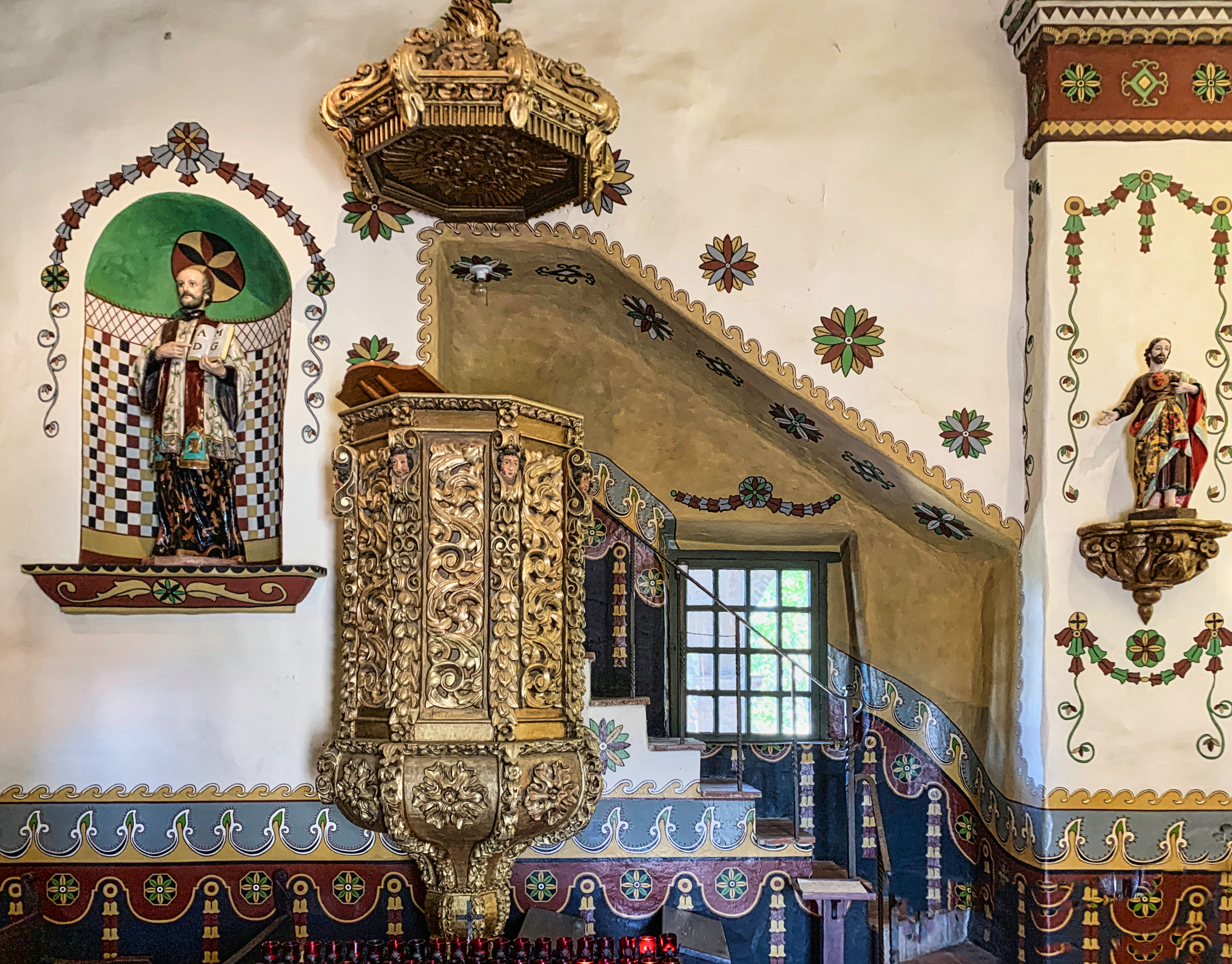
Left wall detail - Father Serra's Church

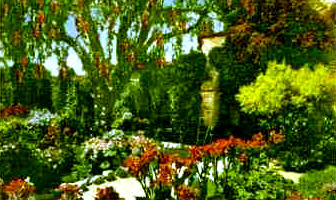
A postcard image of San Juan Capistrano's once-prized California pepper tree, formerly a focal point of the Mission gardens.

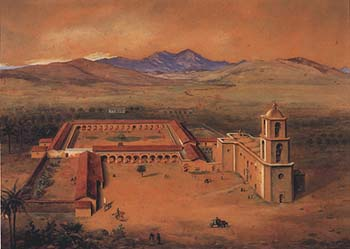
An 1894 painting by Frederick Behre features a wildly improbable steeple over the entrance of San Juan Capistrano's "Great Stone Church" (it was incorrectly believed to portray the way the church looked before the 1812 earthquake; archaeological excavations in 1938 revealed that the steeple placement as shown in the painting was impossible). The landscape in the background of this painting was later modified by John Gutzon Borglum. Watercolor and gouache.

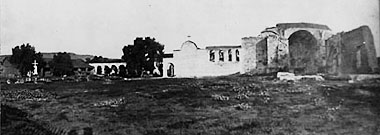
An overall view of the "Mission of the Swallow" around the time of St. John O'Sullivan's arrival in 1910. The Mission's once-renowned California pepper tree can be seen just to the left of the adobe church's espadaña.

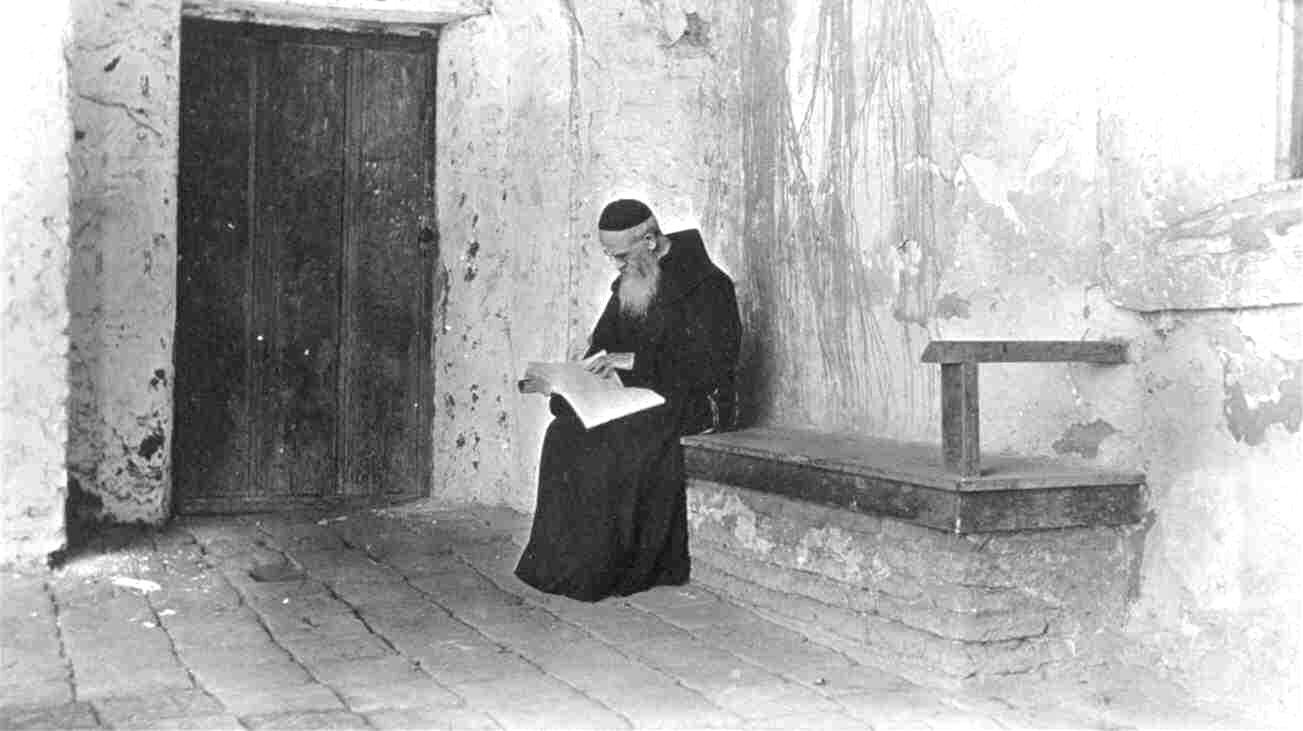
Clerical historian Zephyrin Engelhardt, O.F.M. visited Mission San Juan Capistrano numerous times, beginning in 1915.

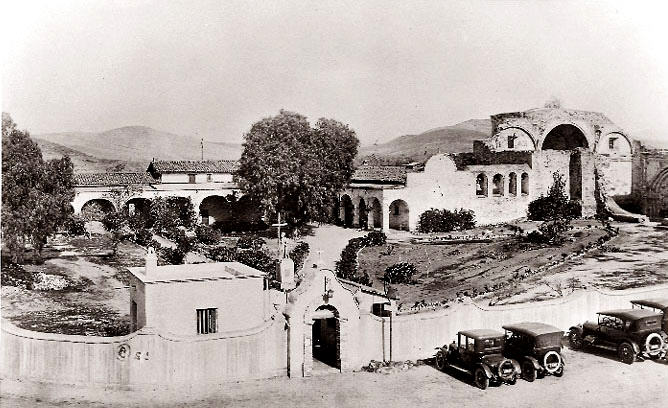
This 1921 view of the Mission San Juan Capistrano complex documents the restoration work that was already well underway by that time. The perimeter garden wall (including the ornate entranceway) and adjacent outbuilding are 1917 additions.

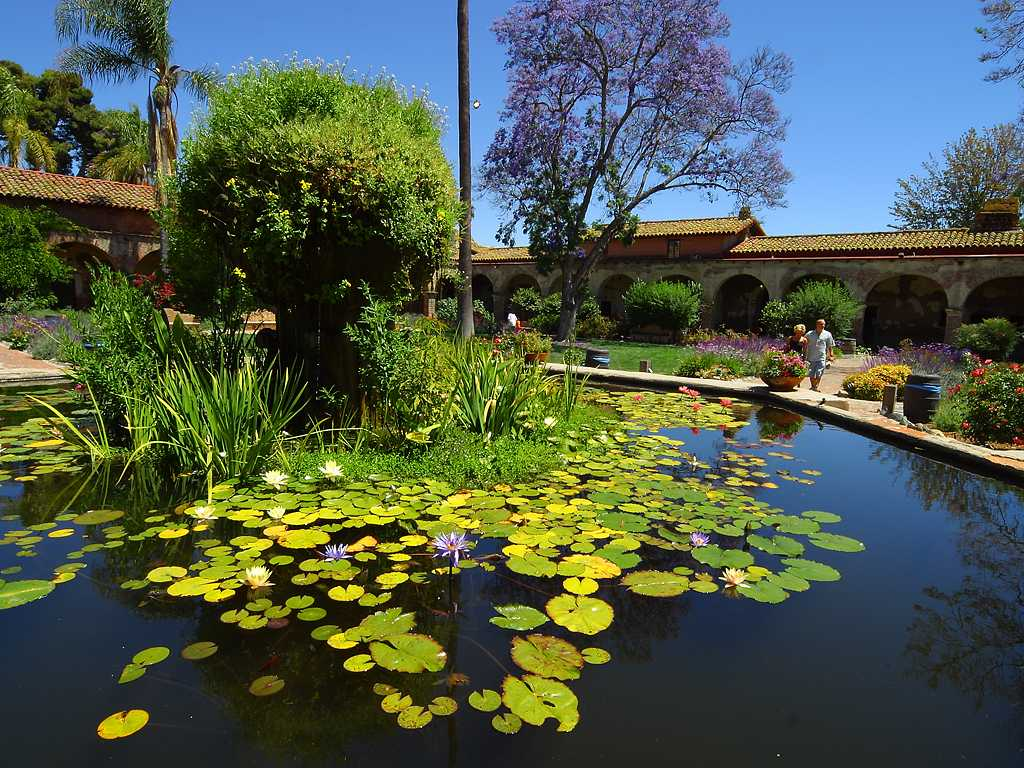
A Moorish-style fountain inside Mission San Juan Capistrano's central courtyard, built in the 1920s through the efforts of St. John O'Sullivan.

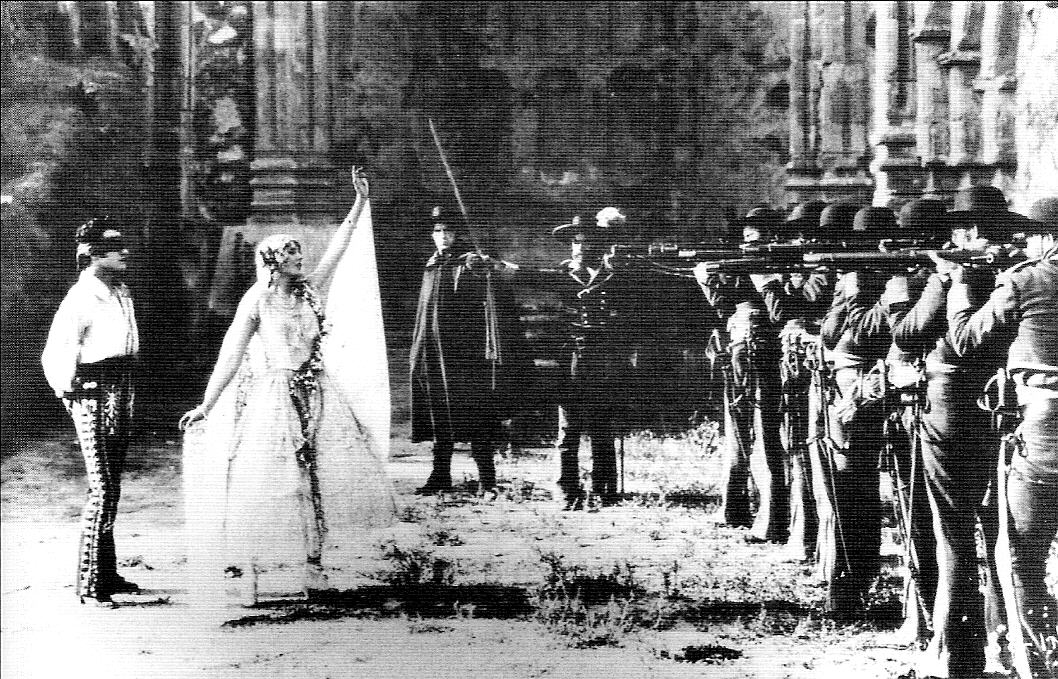
Mary Astor and Gilbert Roland starred in George Fitzmaurice's 1927 motion picture Rose of the Golden West, shot on location on the Mission grounds. The film's penultimate scene (shown here) is set amidst the ruins of "The Great Stone Church."

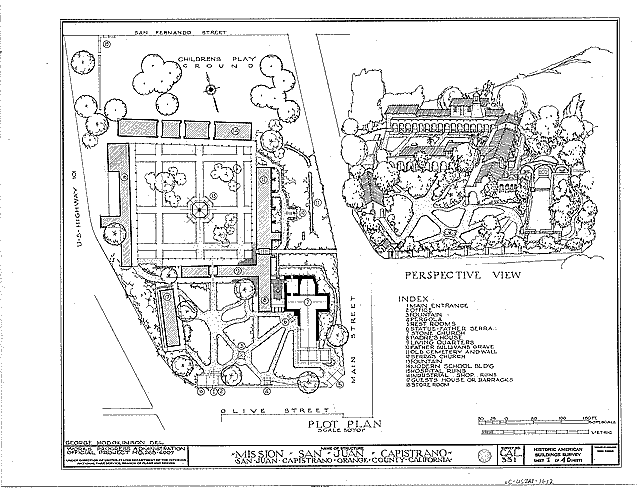
A plot plan and perspective view of Mission San Juan Capistrano as prepared by the Historic American Buildings Survey in 1937.

== See also ==
- Spanish missions in California
- List of Spanish missions in California
- Diego Sepúlveda Adobe (the Costa Mesa Estancia or the Santa Ana Estancia)
- Las Flores Estancia
- San Juan Hot Springs
- Putiidhem
- USNS Mission Capistrano (T-AO-112) – a Mission Buenaventura–class fleet oiler built during World War II
- Oldest churches in the United States
- List of the oldest buildings in the United States
