= Gregório Amúrrio =

Franciscan priest

Father Gregório Amúrrio, O.F.M. was a Catholic priest of the Franciscan Order, and a Spanish missionary in California during the 18th century. A member of the Franciscan Province of Cantabria, Spain, he was one of twenty Franciscans who set out from the missionary College of San Fernando de Mexico in October, 1770 to labor in the Spanish missions in Baja California.

== Biography ==
In the summer of 1773 the Franciscans surrendered all missions on the Baja Peninsula to the Dominicans, after which Father Amúrrio along with five other friars volunteered to work the new missions in Upper California. Upon arrival in San Diego on August 30, Fray Amúrrio was assigned to Mission San Diego de Alcalá; the padre administered his first baptism that same day.

In May, 1774 Father Amúrrio was transferred to the Mission San Luis Obispo de Tolosa, registering his first baptism at that station on July 7. Father Presidente Junípero Serra appointed Father Amúrrio to accompany Father Fermín Lasuén in the founding of Mission San Juan Capistrano in October 1775. However, a native uprising in San Diego forced the priests to abandon the site and flee to the safety of the San Diego Presidio. On November 1, 1776 Father Presidente Serra founded the mission San Juan Capistrano with Friars Amúrrio and Pablo de Mugártegui in attendance. Father Amúrrio conducted his first baptism in San Juan on December 19, 1776.

Ill health compelled Father Amúrrio to retire to the Missionary College in 1779.
