= Pablo de Mugártegui =

Basque Catholic priest, friar and missionary

Pablo de Mugártegui, O.F.M., was a Basque Catholic priest and friar of the Franciscan Order, and a missionary in California during the 18th century. Along with Father Gregório Amúrrio, Mugártegui was a member of the Franciscan Province of Cantabria before he joined the missionary College of San Fernando de Mexico.

When Father President Junípero Serra returned to California from Mexico on March 13, 1777, he brought Mugártegui with him. However, due to illness, Mugártegui had to remain at Mission San Diego de Alcalá for some six months to recuperate. From that point forward he divided his duties between the Mission San Gabriel Arcángel, Mission San Luis Obispo de Tolosa, and Mission San Carlos Borromeo de Carmelo until November 1776 when he was called to the newly founded Mission San Juan Capistrano. The friar performed his first baptism at the new site on December 25 of that year. Mugártegui had long been considered a worthy successor to then Father President Fermín Lasuén and to that end the Missionary College elected him Vice-President (with authority to administer Confirmation) in an emergency on August 16, 1786.

Mugártegui continued in residence at Mission San Juan until November 13, 1789, at which time he retired to Mexico. By order of the Commissary General, Mugártegui presided at the Chapter of the College that had convened to elect a Guardian and Councillors on May 23, 1795.
