= Año Cristiano =

Almanac for Roman Catholic year

Año cristiano
- Author: Jean Croisset

The Año Cristiano is a series of books published annually during the 19th century. An almanac of sorts, each volume (or set of volumes) offers a complete calendar for a particular Roman Catholic year. It was compiled by Jean Croiset (1656-1738) and published at Toulouse from 1812. The Año Cristiano is a Spanish translation published at Barcelona, 1835–55.

The most recent edition of the book, Año cristiano: ó ejercicios devotos para todos los domingos, días de cuaresma y fiestas movibles, was released in 1901 Barcelona, Spain.
