= José Barona =

Spanish missionary in California and Catholic priest

Father José Barona, O.F.M. was a Catholic priest of the Franciscan Order, and a Spanish missionary in California during the late 18th and early 19th centuries. Born in July, 1764 at Villanueva del Conde, in the archdiocese of Burgos, Old Castile, Father Barona entered the Order of St. Francis at the Villa de Velorado in the Province of Burgos on July 18, 1783. He arrived at the missionary College of San Fernando de Mexico on August 24, 1795, and set out from there in 1798 to labor in the Spanish missions in California. Upon arrival in San Diego, Fray Barona performed his first baptism at Mission San Diego de Alcalá on August 4 of that same year.

In early 1811 Father Barona was transferred to Mission San Juan Capistrano, registering his first baptism at that station on April 26. In 1826 Father Barona refused to take the oath of allegiance to the "bogus republic of Mexico" despite the fact that he (along with all of the other Spanish missionaries) had previously sworn to the Independence of Mexico; then Governor José María de Echeandía nevertheless recommended that Barona not be deported when the law of December 20, 1827 (requiring the expulsion of all Spaniards younger than sixty years of age) took effect in California. José Barona remained at San Juan Capistrano, where he ministered to the natives until his death on August 4, 1831. Barona's remains were subsequently interred beneath the floor of the "Great Stone Church," where they rest beside the remains of Fathers Vicente Fustér and Vicente Pascual Oliva.
