= Salinan language =

Extinct Native American language of California

Salinan
- Native to: United States
- Region: central coast California
- Ethnicity: Salinan
- Extinct: 1958
- Language family: Hokan ?: Salinan
- Dialects: Antoniaño; Migueleño; Playano?

Language codes
- ISO 639-3: sln
- Glottolog: sali1253
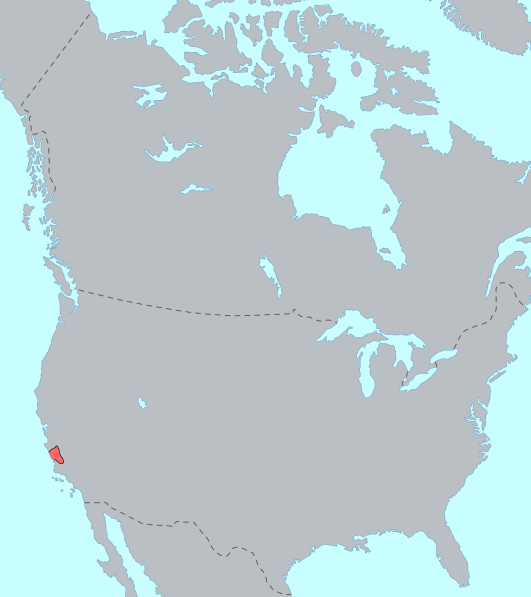
- Pre-contact distribution of Salinan language

- Map of Salinan dialects

Salinan is the historical Indigenous language of the Salinan people of the central coast of California. It has been extinct since the death of the last speaker in 1958.

== History ==
=== Documentation ===
Narrative in Salinan recorded in 1910

The language is attested to some extent in colonial sources such as Sitjar (1860), but the principal published documentation is Mason (1918). The main modern grammatical study, based on Mason's data and on the field notes of John Peabody Harrington and William H. Jacobsen, is Turner (1987), which also contains a complete bibliography of the primary sources and discussion of their orthography.

== Dialects ==
Two dialects are recognized, Antoniaño and Migueleño, associated with the missions of San Antonio and San Miguel, respectively. Antoniaño is "sometimes also termed Sextapay, associated with the area of the Franciscan Mission of San Antonio de Padua in Monterey County." There may have been a third, Playano dialect, as suggested by mention of such a subdivision of the people, but nothing is known of them linguistically but a few proper names possibly recorded in mission records.

== Classification ==
Salinan is a language isolate. It may be a part of the Hokan family. Edward Sapir included it in a subfamily of Hokan, along with Chumash and Seri. This hypothetical classification (which has had many skeptics) found its way into several encyclopedias and presentations of language families before much supporting evidence for this subfamily had been presented, but is currently fairly well established.

Salinan vocabulary from a 1910 recording

== Phonology ==
The charts of consonants and vowels in the Salinan language:

=== Consonants ===
		Bilabial	Dental	Alveolar	Post- alveolar	Palatal	Velar	Glottal
Plosive	voiceless	p	t̪		t̠		k	ʔ
Plosive	ejective	pʼ	t̪ʼ		t̠ʼ		kʼ	
Plosive	voiced	b	d				ɡ	
Fricative				s	ʃ		x	h
Affricate	voiceless			ts	tʃ			
Affricate	ejective			tsʼ	tʃʼ			
Nasal	plain	m		n				
Nasal	glottalized	ˀm		ˀn				
Lateral	voiced			l				
Lateral	glottalized			ˀl				
Trill				r				
Approximant	plain	w				j		
Approximant	glottalized	ˀw				ˀj		

Voiced plosives /b d ɡ/ likely came as a result of Spanish influence.

=== Vowels ===
	Front	Back
Close	i iː	u uː
Close-mid	(e eː)	(o oː)
Open-mid	(ɛ)	(ɔ)
Open	a aː	

Mid vowels occurred likely due to Spanish influence.

== Vocabulary ==
Salinan plant and animal names from Mason (1918):

=== Animals ===
English gloss	Antoniaño	Migueleño	plural
fly	awa·´tén	a·we·te´ʽ	awaˑ´tneʟ
bullhead fish		cat’	
Lewis's woodpecker	ca´knil	cra´knil	
bird	caˑxwe	sa·xe	ca·xten
ground owl, gray titmouse	ska´tata	cko·´tɑtʚ	
prairie falcon	ck’an	ck’an’	
crow	ckaˑk’	cka·k’	skaˑ´k’tenat
snake, worm, grub	ck’ot	ck’ot	sk’o´teʟet
gull		clot	
abalone		cmaiyi´k’	
horned owl	cukunui´’	cokonoi´’	
skunk	cuwa´’	cowa´	cuwa´ʽɴeʟ
squirrel	cuˑmk’o´m’	camko´’m	cumk’omona´neʟ
small ducks		cu´n’cun’	
fish	swan	cwa´’ɴ	cwaˑne´t
lizard	swakaka´	cwaˑkek’a´’	
gopher	e´cece	ee´cesi	
male squirrel		emace´	
pinacate	eˑts’		
tarantula hawk	etskutchɑ´ten		
louse	tik’e´’	i´ke	tik’eneʟ
ant	ilka´t	ilka´t	
Mexican bluebird	kalep’a´n	kelep’a´n	
small birds			kats’aˑne´ʟˑ
blue-crested jay		kalau	
house finch	kalwatcai´	k’aluatc´a’i	
goose, crane	ka´lakʽ	kalakʽ	kalak´ne´ʟ
mosquito		kaca´p	
grasshopper	kacala´	kaculo´	
Lawrence's goldfinch		kiope´ts	
kingfisher	k’cu´i	kitcili´tna	
band-tailed pigeon	klau´it		
hare	koi’	koʟ	kolane´ʟ
tarantula		kocai´ye	
mountain quail		k’aiya´k´	
red abalones	kilṭau´	k’elṭ´u´ʽ	
spider	la´kana		
gray rabbit		ʟa´ma	
raven	la´’	lap’	
tarantula hawk		lape´	
duck	leaṭ’	helpa´ṭ’	leaṭ’ten
wasps, bees	lme´m’	leme´’m	
teal	le´ponta		
Gambel's sparrow	le´rporti	leˑ´rpati	
coyote	ʟk’a´	helk’a´	elk’ane´ʟ; elk’a´lekten
Canada goose	loina´	t’lai	
small antelope		lowe´cɑt’	
rat	ma´kiʟ	mɑ´kel	
rabbit	map’	map’	map’tenat; map’aˑ´nel
eel	masau´hal	masau´wel	
chipmunk	matse´ko	mats’e´ko’	
hummingbird	mɑ´ts’we´l’		
antelope	mu´i’	mu´ı̄’	
clams		naiyʚk’	
pocket gopher	nakɑ´k		
young antelope		nʚtc’	
elk	ac	p’ae	acte´n, astenat
California woodpecker	pelaˑ´kˑa’	pala·´kɑkʼ	
two-pronged buck		paṭalti	
hummingbird		peˑ´lts’e	
ruby-crowned wren	pete´ts		
lark finch	pi´ukutc		
sucker		pʽu´lxoiʽ	
wildcat	sam’	snam	
black ant		santʚn	
shrike		sapele´	
one-pronged buck		sektaiˑkna	
stinking ant		senese	
unidentified fish		septa´ʟ	
snake	senkahl	senk’oʟ	
doe	sepo		
mouse	seloˑ´iʽ		
swallow		siata´nil	
cañon finch	sit	set’	
red-headed woodpecker		sik	
animal		sitaipin	
whip-poor-will		skalo´	
sparrowhawk	skele´le	skeleˑ´le	
blue crane		ska·´u	
shellfish		sk’eˑ´’n	
raccoon	skaiya´ʼ	s’kai´ya	skaiyana´neʟ
rat	sk’almo´k’	sk’almokʼ	sk’almok’oten
green-winged teal		slipe´pʚ	
quail		smate·´xan	
bee	smo´kɑt	smo´ket	
rattlesnake	smeˑkoi´	smekoi´	smekoiiten
female skunk		smohel	
mole	smokok’e´	smokike´	
cat	smic		
eagle	sai´yu	snai	saiyane´ʟ
kangaroo rat, tusa	snaˑk	snaʽk	
butterfly	soko´ko	soko´ko	
spotted fawn		so´ha	
very small ant		sopokan	
red-tailed hawk	speˑk’	spiˑk’	
burrowing owl		spʽoko´ʼ	
fox	sto’	sto’	
young squirrel		sumhe	
bat	stamaka´la		
bat	suhao´ye		
black-shining flycatcher	swe´ho	swīˑ´yo	
male coyote		swaa´	
crane		taˑlwa·´x	
worm	ta´lmui		
nuthatch	taka´la		
Lawrence's goldfinch	ta´nukupel		
crane		tapṭe´ʟ	
woodpecker	tena´k		
male antelope		tepce´	
owl	tesik’	ṭeci´kʼ	ticik’neʟ
pelican	tē·´u	tewe´	
pigeon		tikʽmo´ʽ	
worm		time´hai	
great California vulture	titc´k	te’tc’	
badger	t´mɑ´cɑx		
seal	tʽoˑ´i		
badger		tʽoˑ´io	
sea otter		t’sue	
whale	tʸa´i		
blue jay	ṭ’ai’	ṭahi	
flea	ṭa·yiʟ	ṭaiyeʟ’	tayiʟtena´x
crab		ṭaitc’aˑ´tak	
serpent	ṭaˑliˑye´’		
puma	ṭa´’muʟ	ṭ´a’muʟ	ṭa´’multenax
deer	ṭaa´’	ṭaa´’p	ṭaatne´ʟ
bat	ṭapilale		
turtledove	ṭaˑxwe´ne’	ṭʽaˑxwe´n’	
bear	ṭaxai´’	ṭᴀxai´’	ṭaxai´yukten
turtle	ṭawai	ṭawʚ´	ṭawaiiten
salmon	ṭetiyau´	tʽetēyau	ṭetiyauutén
kingbird	ṭike´	ṭ’ike´’	
small frog		ṭ’iˑkolʚ´	
serpent		ṭinele´ʼ	
grubs, worms		ṭ’iope´’	
mountain lizard		ṭʽoiyelɘ´’	
gray squirrel	ṭooloc	ṭoˑlo´c	ṭoolecna´neʟ
wolf	ṭʽo·´xo	ṭoˑxo´ʼ	ṭʽoˑ´xolanel
curved-bill thrush	tca	tca	
Brewer's blackbird	tca´la	tcal	
red-shafted woodpecker	tc’am’	tc’a’ᴍɪ	
cricket	tcʼeˑl’		
blue jay	tc’ele´uʼ		
bat		tc’e´mtcem	
fish-hawk	tcikʼ	tc´iktcik	
caterpillar	tcoana´hi	ṭaau´	
mottled snake		ts’aike´’	
yellow-bellied woodpecker		ts’e´’ʟ	
owl		ts’ɘ´tʽenek’	
spider	ts’ope´n	sopne´t	ts’ope´nlax
red-winged blackbird	wakeno´		
frog	wa·´kiṭ	wa´kɑṭ’	wakiṭten; wa´kɑṭ’ṭʽa´ʟ
bullbat		wa´lwal’	
Oregon bunting	wa´tc	watc’	
white goose		wau	
blue jay, bunting	witcele´’	wetcele´’	
martin		weˑtelo´’	
woodpecker		we´tok	
mussel	xaii´k		
crane	xalau´’		
ground tit	xane´o		
lizard	xakele´	xapailʚ´’	
yellow-billed magpie	atce´tc	xatca´tc’	
roadrunner, ground cuckoo	xom	xo·´’mɪ	
quail	ho´mlik´		
red-headed vulture	xopne´l	xo·pɴe´ʟ	
dog	xutc	xutcaˑi	xoste´n

=== Plants ===
English gloss	Antoniaño	Migueleño	plural
wild oats		atʟoˑ´s	
bark	awu´’l	awuʟ’	
tule	aˑxo´ʟ		axone´ʟ
seed	avexte´ya		ayextel’i´ya
bud	ca´l		ca´ltine
quijara de pala	ck’ua´		
large soaproot		ck’alʚ´’	
clover		cpo´k’at’; cpoku´mt’a	
brush	cɑ´tala		
leaf	ctan’		stanane´ʟ
blackberries		elpo´nʚ	
wild seeds		heˑʟka´’	
hay, grass	k’aˑṭ’	kat	k’atsane´l
sunflower		k’a·´ciʟ	
tule		k’ɑ´mta’	
acorn	k’a’	kɑp’	ka’te´ʟ
small young oaks	ka´pitc’		
large pine nut	kʽe	kʽe	
fern root		k’ēˑ´ciapowat	
tuna (prickly pear)		k’eso´i’	
cedar	keṭipui		keṭipoilax
root		ko’iʏi	
melon	k’olopopo´		
bulb, wild potato		k’ona·´ka	
cacomite		kotc’e´ʟ	
forest	ku´katak		
flower	mɑkawi´ʼ	mɑkewe´	makawili´ʼ
milkweed		matai´’ʏi	
toloache		moˑnoi´’ʏi	
laurel	mopa´kʽ		
ivy	mucuelit		
wild grape		o·pɪs	
chia	pa´siʟ	pɑ´siʟ	
post oak		p’ɑ´pex	
white oak	at’	p’aˑ´’t	atne´ʟ; p’atʽne´lat
manzanita	patʽax	patʽa´k	patʽaxtén
live oak	askle´t	paxa´kiʟ	
buckeye		pʚca´ʼ	
willow		pʚsxe´t	
grass		petʟ	
seedlings		peyexte´toʼ	
seaweed		powa´tka	
fruit		pamputen	
fruit		tenpute´s	
mescal	saxe´t		
alfilerillos		seneste´ʟ	
brush		smɑt	
acorn		smoʼ	
clover		smo´kumeʟ	
acorn		sxau´witʽ	
seeds		tana´t	
wicker		tana´st	
grains	tate´		
small soaproot		tetai´	
elderberries		tetɑ´pʽkoˑʟ	
root	tepa´s	tepa´so	
oak		tʽio´i	
acorn		t’i´pi’	
mescal		tʽᴍɑ	
grass		tʽʚma's	
milkweed		tʚmaˑ´ʟ	
grass for baskets		tʽonawɑ´’	
gooseberries		toipen	
flower of mescal	ṭaiya´c		
wood	ṭa·´ka’aṭʽ	ṭa·´kaṭa	tak’ane´ʟ
tobacco	ṭala´’ᴍ	ṭoela´m	
stump of tree	ṭa´pin	ṭamoina´co	
fruit	tata	ṭaˑ´tʽoʼ	
root		ṭepastéɴ	
juice	ṭetaco	ṭita´cu	
pine nuts	tcʽo’	tʽo’	ṭotenʚ´l
brush	ṭoki		
barsalillo		tc’e·´lak	
pine	tc’o’		
wood for pipe		tcʽo´ʟʚ	
chuckberries		ts’eta´kiʟ	
spine	xa´ke		
acorn	xo´le		
live oak	hasli´t’		
acorn	ha´siʟ		

=== Oak species ===
Oak acorns were the staple food for Salinans. In Mason's The Ethnology of the Salinan Indians (see Bibliography), on pgs 118–119, the author makes an unsuccessful attempt to match Salinan names for oak species with their scientific names. He describes the following species: "(1) cxa'uwat`, a live oak with spined leaves; (2) t`io'i, a large white tree with a white acorn growing on the coast; (3) paxa'kiL, an oak with pointed leaves and a very large acorn which grows on the hills; (4) p`a'pix, an oak with serrated leaves, called by Henshaw "post oak"; (5) p`a`t, an oak with small serrated leaves and a large acorn, called by Henshaw "white oak"; (6) cmo', an oak with smooth, non-spined leaves." He also writes, "While the statement is not definite, it seems that acorns from live-oaks were preferred for mush, those of deciduous oaks for bread. Of the former three varieties were used, (1) cxau'wat', (2) t`io'i, and (3) paxa'kiL in the order of preference. Of the latter (4) p'a'pix and (5) p`a`t were used. Cmo' (6) was another oak sometimes used." In his later work, The Language of the Salinan Indians, he gives an additional Antoniaño word for an unspecified evergreen oak, (7) hasli't', and an Antoniaño word for oak saplings, ka'pitc'.

The following species of oak are prevalent in the territory of the Salinans: valley oak (Quercus lobata), coast live oak (Quercus agrifolia), blue oak (Quercus douglasii), canyon live oak (Quercus chrysolepis), California scrub oak (Quercus berberidifolia), interior live oak (Quercus wislizeni) and its close relative Shreve oak (Quercus parvula var. shrevei), Jolon oak (Quercus x jolonensis), which is a hybridization of lobata x douglasii common in the vicinity of the Nacimiento, San Antonio, and Arroyo Seco river valleys), and, although it is not a true oak, the tanoak (Notholithocarpus densifloris). To a lesser extent, there are also locations with coast scrub oak (Quercus dumosa), leather oak (Quercus durata), California black oak (Quercus kelloggii), oracle oak (Quercus x morehus), and perhaps others. There are more prevalent species listed here than Mason's list of three live oaks and three deciduous oaks.

Local knowledge provides critical clues as to what species the Salinan names are referencing. The task is complicated by the diverse expressions of phenotypes and hybridizations in California oaks, as well as the lack of research in the topic and Mason's incomplete and erroneous information. Furthermore, it is possible that Salinan classification for oaks followed a different scheme than those of modern taxonomy.

==== Live oaks ====
Mason's description of evergreen oaks are more easily identified than the deciduous oaks.

(1) Cxa'uwat` is likely the coast live oak, Quercus agrifolia, which is an evergreen oak with spined leaves and has acorns that were a preferred food source among Indigenous Californians.

(2) T`io'i is possibly the tanoak, Notholithocarpus densifloris, which is an evergreen oak-like species that only grows near the coast, prevalent near redwood groves in coastal canyons, where oaks tend to be less common. Tanoaks have large acorns. Most oaks are higher up on the steep Santa Lucia mountains, so having tanoaks available would make them a preferred food source during shoreline visits. As for the white coloration, this could be referring to how the leaves have whitish undersides, the young acorns have a whiter tint than many oaks, and the bark tends to be gray with white blotches.

(3) Paxa'kiL is likely the canyon live oak, Quercus chrysolepis, which is an evergreen oak with pointed leaves, a very large acorn, and grows in the higher terrain of the Santa Lucia mountains.

(7) Hasli't' is an Antoniaño term, not included in Mason's list of preferred culinary oaks. It may be a synonym for a Migueleño word; it may refer to a species uncommon or absent in Migueleño range but noticeably present in Antoniaño territory, such as the Shreve oak or coast scrub oak; or it may be an additional species like California scrub oak or a botanical concept, such as a term for the genus Quercus or sub-genus "red oak," missing in Mason's study of Migueleño Salinan vocabulary.

==== Deciduous oaks - First hypothesis on Mason's classification ====
Although there is significant inaccuracy in Mason's list of deciduous oaks – and he admits to being unsuccessful in his attempt to match Salinan terms to oak species – his research is the singular published source listing Salinan botanical terms. Several hypotheses have been proposed to make sense of Mason's research on Salinan words for oaks.

Mason states that the two deciduous oaks principally used for making bread had serrated leaves. However, there are no serrated deciduous oaks in this region of California. It is more likely that he meant "lobate" than "serrated," in which case there are multiple species common in the area which have deciduous, lobate leaves, most notably the valley oak, the blue oak, and their hybrid, the Jolon oak.

Acorns from valley oaks and blue oaks were a major food source for Salinans, which would fit with Salinans designating two deciduous oak species for preferred culinary use. Valley oaks resemble their eastern cousins the post oak, so it is possible they are what is meant by (4) p`a'pix. Blue oaks have smaller leaves, girthier acorns, and they are a white oak, so it could be referred to by (5) p`a`t, though both valley oaks and blue oaks are technically considered "white oaks" for the color of their inner bark. Mason provides a plural form for (5) p`a`t but not for (4) p`a'pix, which suggests that either Mason simply did not record the plural form of (4) p`a'pix or that it tended to occur in a more solitary fashion than (5) p`a`t. There is a case for the latter. Valley oaks and blue oaks both occur in park-like woodlands throughout much of Salinan land, but valley oaks are much more inclined to growing alone in open space, whereas blue oaks tend to congregate close together in groves.

Mason says that (6) cmo' was a deciduous oak with smooth, non-spined leaves. Valley oaks, blue oaks, and Jolon oaks all have smooth, non-spined leaves, which would seem to fit with (6) cmo'. Again, Mason's terms are self-contradictory. (4) P`a'pix and (5) p`a`t are described as major food sources, whereas (6) cmo' was only an auxiliary source of acorns, and it is known that Indigenous Californians heavily consumed valley and blue oaks, so it is improbable that (6) cmo' is an umbrella term for deciduous oaks with smooth, non-spined leaves. If smooth, non-spined leaves refers to ovate leaves, then more sense can be made of the classification. Blue oaks frequently exhibit ovate leaves, and they are deciduous, so it is possible that (6) cmo' refers to blue oaks with ovate leaves..

Under this first hypothesis:

(4) P`a'pix refers to valley oaks, which are deciduous, a preferred acorn source, have lobate leaves, tend to grow far apart, and resemble the eastern post oak.

(5) P`a`t refers to blue oaks, which are deciduous, another preferred acorn source, have smaller lobate leaves and produce girthier acorns than valley oaks, tend to grow close together in groves, and are a white oak.

(6) Cmo' refers to blue oaks with ovate leaves.

Jolon oaks, which are common on Salinan land, would possibly be classified under either (4), (5), or (6) perhaps depending on which tree they more closely matched.

==== Deciduous oaks - Second hypothesis on Mason's classification ====
Several problems arise regarding the first hypothesis. For one, there are a number of common local oak species thus far omitted, most notably the California scrub oak. Secondly, if Salinans classified blue oaks with ovate leaves separately from their lobate counterparts, then it is plausible they would also classify together the three species of deciduous, lobate-leaved oaks – valley oaks, blue oaks, and Jolon oaks – under a single name. Even though there are noticeable morphological differences between these three species, their proclivity to hybridize and morphological similarities may have given Salinans a reason to lump them together under a single term, especially if they distinguished ovate-leaved blue oaks as a separate type of oak. A second hypothesis is as follows:

(4) P`a'pix refers to the deciduous, lobate-leaved valley oaks, blue oaks, and Jolon oaks.

(5) P`a`t refers to the evergreen California scrub oak, which is characterized by its small, serrated leaves, and plentiful, large acorns, and it is a white oak. In this case, Mason would be incorrect to consider it a deciduous oak, but correct to describe its small, serrated leaves and plentiful, large acorns.

(6) Cmo' refers to ovate-leaved blue oaks and Jolon oaks.

==== Deciduous oaks - Third and fourth hypotheses on Mason's classification ====
Again, there are problems the previous hypotheses. For one, although blue oaks do frequently exhibit ovate leaves, it is also common for a single tree to exhibit both ovate and lobate leaves. It would be unusual for Salinans to treat ovate-leaved individuals as a different kind of tree, eating acorns from lobate-leaved blue oaks over those from ovate-leaved trees, especially when there is no noticeable culinary difference. Scrub oak acorns are not a preferred food source, containing higher levels of tannins, so it is unlikely that (5) p`a`t would refer to scrub oaks. There are still other oak species unaccounted for in this lexicon, although it should not be seen as necessarily comprehensive. Given that his list of animals and plants is quite long, it would be strange for a major species of oak to be overlooked.

The third and fourth hypotheses posit that:

(4) P`a'pix refers to valley oaks.

(5) P`a`t refers to blue oaks.

(6) Cmu' refers to another species of oak.

In the third hypothesis, (6) cmu' could be a deciduous California black oak, though it is unlikely since their leaves are lobate and serrated. It is more likely that Mason was incorrect about cmu' being deciduous. There are several other evergreen oaks common on Salinan land. Two contenders are the California scrub oak and the interior live oak. As mentioned, scrub oak acorns are especially high in tannins and would serve as a last resort ration. Interior live oaks and their close relatives the Shreve oak are known to have smooth, ovate leaves. The fourth hypothesis proposes that:

(6) Cmu' refers to the interior live oak, and possibly also the closely related Shreve oak – which was only treated as a separate species from the interior live oak as recently as 1980 – for often having smooth, ovate leaves. Interior live oaks are somewhat common, but their acorns are not nearly as big as the deciduous oaks. They would provide only enough acorns to act as a supplemental food source, which again coheres with Mason's description of the tree's role in Salinan life.

Moreover, Mason lists p`a`t adjacent to pat`a'k, the Salinan word for manzanita. He provides plural forms for both, whereas for many trees he does not provide a plural form. Other botanical terms for which he provides a plural form include: flowers, grass, leaves, acorns, pine nuts, cedars (which may actually mean coast redwoods rather than the California incense cedar, or perhaps includes both), tule reeds, buds, and wood. This may be suggestive of the role of the plural form in Salinan. These botanical terms all appear relatively homogeneous: a field of wildflowers, a grassland, a litter of acorns, a pile of pine nuts, a grove of redwoods, a bed of tule reeds, a cluster of buds, a pile of wood. The plural form of trees is forest, ku'katak, possibly due to usually having a mix of species. Both manzanita and blue oak tend to occur in stands or groves. Additionally, both species have an airy, branching structure as well as blue-tinted foliage. The fact they share such strong phonetic similarity suggests the Salinans had an association between their similar ecological characteristics. As an aside, the absence of such plants as chamise on Mason's list – an extremely widespread shrub on Salinan land – further shows he presented inaccurate and/or incomplete information, but there is hardly any other research on Salinan language available today.

In this fourth hypothesis, Mason would be incorrect about (6) being deciduous, but he would be correct about all three species' morphological character and their relative availability as a food source. The difference between (1–3) and (4–6) would not be evergreen vs. deciduous, but a dichotomy between acorns used for mush and acorns used for bread, as Mason stated. This hypothesis accounts for all the major species of oak on Salinan land and correctly represents their varying degrees of importance as food sources: first the stately valley oaks, second the woodlands of blue oaks, and with interior live oaks as an available supplement.

==== Summary ====
Although Mason struggled to understand what oak species correspond to what Salinan terms, his work has provided valuable information. Tenable progress and hypotheses have been made. It appears that Mason's list is not comprehensive of all oak tree names, that it instead focuses on the species with the most valuable food resources. It is probably the case that: (1) cxa'uwat` is coast live oak, (2) t`io'i is tanoak, (3) paxa'kiL is canyon live oak, (4) p`a'pix is valley oak, (5) p`a`t is blue oak, (6) cmu' is interior live oak, and (7) hasli't' remains unspecified. Mason also gives multiple words for acorn; future research is needed.

== Bibliography ==
- Campbell, Lyle (1997). American Indian languages: the historical linguistics of Native America. Oxford: Oxford University Press. ISBN 9780195094275.
- Mason, John Alden (1912). The Ethnology of the Salinan Indians. University of California Press. Retrieved December 15, 2023.
- Mason, John Alden (1918). The language of the Salinan Indians. University of California Press. pp. 436–.University of California Publications in American Archaeology and Ethnology 14.1-154.
- Sitjar, Fr. Buenaventura (1861) Vocabulario de la lengua de los naturales de la mission de San Antonio, Alta California. Shea's Library of American Linguistics, 7. Reprinted 1970 at New York by AMS Press.
- Turner, Katherine (1987). Aspects of Salinan Grammar, Unpublished Ph.D. dissertation. University of California at Berkeley.
