= José Bernardo Sánchez =

Spanish missionary

José Bernardo Sánchez (September 7, 1778 – January 15, 1833) was a Spanish missionary in colonial Mexico and Alta California.

== Early life ==
Born in Robledillo de Mohernando, Old Castile, Spain, Sánchez became a Franciscan on October 9, 1794. In 1803 he joined the missionary College of San Fernando de Mexico in the Viceroyalty of New Spain (colonial México).

== California Missions ==
He traveled on to Las Californias the next year, 1804, where he worked at the following missions:

- Mission San Diego de Alcalá (1804–1820)
- Mission La Purísima Concepción (1820–1821)
- Mission San Gabriel Arcángel (1821–1827)

In 1806, as chaplain, Sánchez accompanied a military expedition against the Californian indigenous peoples. In 1821, with Mariano Payeras, he went with an exploring expedition into the interior of Alta California to search for new mission sites.

During the winter of 1826-1827, as head of the San Gabriel mission, Sánchez hosted the party of explorer Jedediah Smith, the first ever to travel overland to California from the United States. Most of the group stayed at San Gabriel while Smith traveled to San Diego to report to José María Echeandía, the governor.

From 1827 to 1831, Sánchez reluctantly held the position of Presidente of the California mission chain and of Vicáreo Foraneo (archbishop) to the bishop. The 1913 Catholic Encyclopedia describes him as a "very pious and energetic missionary" who disliked holding the position of authority. His incessant appeals for relief were at last granted, but he survived only two years.

=== Opposed secularization ===
During his term he vigorously opposed the Mexican government's secularization scheme, which was strongly supported by Governor Echeandia. In a long series of critical notes he claimed that the plan would result in the destruction of the missions and the ruin of the neophytes. "As far as it concerns me personally," he wrote, "...would that it might be tomorrow, so that I might retire between the four walls of a cell to weep over the time I wasted in behalf of these unfortunates." It has been said that the sight of the inevitable ruin hastened his death. His remains were buried at the foot of the altar of San Gabriel Mission.

Catholic Church titles
Preceded by Narcisco Durán	President-General of the Missions of Alta California; 1827–1830	Succeeded by Narcisco Durán
