= Buenaventura Sitjar =

Spanish Franciscan missionary

- Church: Mission San Antonio de Padua
- Other post: Mission San Miguel Arcángel

Orders
- Ordination: Franciscan. April, 1758, joined the College of San Fernando de Mexico

Personal details
- Born: 9 December 1739 Porreres, Mallorca
- Died: 3 September 1808 (aged 68) San Antonio, California
- Buried: Mission San Antonio de Padua
- Denomination: Catholic
- Occupation: Franciscan missionary

Buenaventura Sitjar (9 December 1739 – 3 September 1808) was a Franciscan missionary who served in California until his death.

He became a friar in the Order of Friars Minor in April, 1758, joining the College of San Fernando de Mexico. In 1770 he received orders to go to California, and he reached San Diego on 21 May 1771.

He helped found Mission San Antonio de Padua and served there until his death on 3 September 1808. During his tenure, 3400 Indians were baptized. He became fluent in their language, a Salinan language called Antoniaño, Telamé, or Sextapay (after its location). With the assistance of Father Miguel Pieras, he wrote a dictionary translating the language into Spanish. Although the list of words is not as long as Felipe Arroyo de la Cuesta's dictionary of 2884 words and sentences in the Mutsun idiom of Mission San Juan Bautista, Sitjar's gives the pronunciation and fuller explanations. This work forms the seventh volume of John G. Shea's Library of American Linguistics (New York, 1861), and was published separately under the title of Vocabulary of the Language of the San Antonio Missions (1863).

He also left a journal of an exploring expedition which he accompanied in 1795. In 1797, he participated in the founding of Mission San Miguel Arcángel. His body was buried in the Mission San Antonio sanctuary.
