= José Joaquin Jimeno =

Spanish missionary

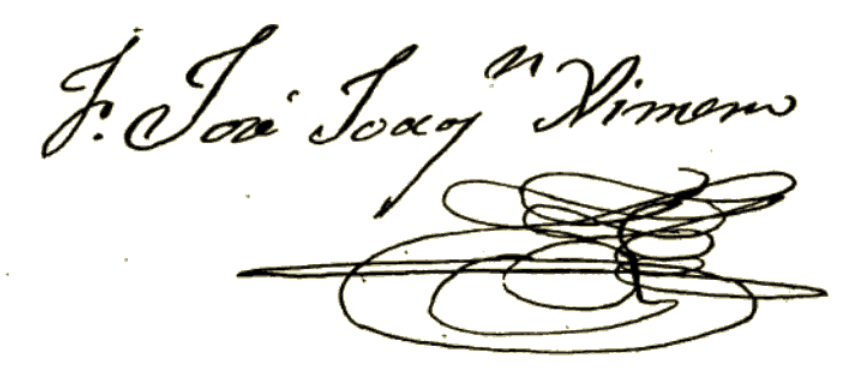
signature

Father José Joaquin Jimeno (30 November 1804, Mexico City – 14 March 1856, Santa Barbara, California) was a Mexican-born missionary in California.

Father Jimeno is known to have traveled with Father Mariano Payeras to San Jacinto, a distant rancho of Mission San Luis Rey de Francia in September 1821. He also appears in an 1836 sketch of Mission San Gabriel Arcángel. From 1838 to 1844, he held the position of Presidente of the California mission chain and of Vicáreo Foraneo to the bishop.

== Early life and education ==
Fr. José Joaquín Jimeno was born on November 30, 1804, in the City of Mexico. He received the habit of St. Francis at the College of San Fernando de Mexico, in 1823, after studying at the Colegio de San Ildefonso, Mexico City. He made his profession in the Order in 1824; the exact day is not known. Having completed his studies for the holy priesthood, he was ordained in 1827, when only 23 years of age.

== Career ==
He was immediately sent to California and arrived at San Diego, California in September 1827. Being assigned an assistant to Fr. Antonio Peiri at Mission San Luis Rey, Fr. Joaquín remained there from October 1 of that year until about the summer of 1830, when he was transferred to Mission Santa Cruz. His first entry in the Baptismal Register there is dated October 31, and his last bears a date of February 17, 1833, when a Zacatecan Franciscan took charge. Thereupon Fr. Jimeno went to Mission Santa Inés, baptizing there for the first time on May 14, 1833. At this Mission, he remained till May 1850 but baptized for the last time on December 8, 1849. While in charge, Rt. Rev. Bishop Francisco García Diego y Moreno on May 4, 1844, opened the first Diocesan Seminary at the Mission, and appointed Fr. J. J. Jimeno its rector.

In 1839, the College of San Fernando de Mexico chose him Presidente of the Fernandinos Franciscans in California, and he held the office until the death, in 1846, of Fr. Durán, when he was elected by that College to succeed the deceased as Comisário Prefecto. At the close of the term of six years, he was re-elected. In 1840, Bishop José Lázaro de la Garza y Ballesteros of Sonora named Fr. J. J. Jimeno vicário foraneo for the southern part of California.

When the seminary at Mission Santa Inés was ceded to the Picpus Fathers, Fr. J. J. Jimeno with Fr. Sánchez withdrew to Santa Barbara, California but both were soon transferred to Mission San Gabriel, Fr. Sánchez attending the parish of Los Angeles. Fr. Jimeno baptized at the Mission from December 8, 1850, till October 11, 1851. Toward the close of 1852, Fr. Joaquín returned to Santa Barbara, where he planned, and finally succeeded in founding the Missionary College of Our Lady of Sorrows in the City of Santa Barbara, and where he died on March 14, 1856, in the odor of sanctity. The entry in the Burial Register reads as follows:—

"No. 1,344. On March 15, 1856, ecclesiastical burial was given in the crypt of the Mission to the body of the Very Rev. Fr. Comisário Prefecto of the Missions and local Superior of this College of Our Lady of Sorrows, Fr. José Joaquín Jimeno, who, after long and important services to this country for the space of 28 years, and after suffering with unalterable patience a long and painful infirmity, having received the holy Sacraments of Penance, Viaticum, and Extreme Unction, passed away yesterday amid the grief of all the students of this Apostolic College and of the inhabitants of this city. At his burial the Rt. Rev. Bishop of this Diocese, Don Thaddeus Amat, officiated pontifically. In testimony whereof I have signed.-Fr. José Maria de Jesus González."

As Comisário Prefecto, Fr. Jimeno had the authority to administer the Sacrament of Confirmation when no Bishop was in the country. We find him exercising his privilege at least once at Mission San Juan Capistrano on August 2 and 15, 1850, when 132 persons were confirmed.

Catholic Church titles
Preceded by Narcisco Durán	President-General of the Missions of Alta California; 1838–1844	Succeeded by Narcisco Durán
