= Vicente de Santa Maria =

Spanish Franciscan priest

Father Vicente de Santa María (1742 – July 16, 1806) was a Spanish Franciscan priest who accompanied explorer Juan de Ayala on the first Spanish naval entry aboard the San Carlos into the San Francisco Bay. Born in the village of Aras in Navarre Province, Spain, Santa Maria moved to Mexico City to attend the Colegio de San Fernando seminary in 1769. Santa Maria wrote detailed first-hand accounts of the journey of the San Carlos and of the indigenous inhabitants of the San Francisco Bay Area prior to Spanish colonization. He later served at Mission San Francisco de Asis in San Francisco and Mission San Buenaventura in Ventura, California, where he died in 1806.
