= Vicente Francisco de Sarría =

Basque missionary

Father Vicente Francisco de Sarría (1767 Etxebarri, Spain – 1835 Soledad) was a Basque missionary to the Americas.

== Venture into Alta California ==
Father Sarría baptized John Gilroy, the first foreigner to permanently settle in California. Gilroy landed from the Isaac Todd in Monterey in 1814, and was baptized Juan Antonio Maria on September 29 of that year. He also founded Mission San Rafael Arcángel and helped establish the Santa Ysabel Asistencia (on February 2, 1819 he wrote that "...in the place called Santa Isabel, toward the Sierra, they count a goodly number of baptized souls...I asked the governor for permission to formally erect a chapel there." The padre is also credited with the "first original contribution ever offered by a resident of California in the field of medicine," an 1830 paper on the use of the caesarian section as a method of childbirth.

== End of the Californian missions ==
When Father Señan retired in August 1823, Father Sarría took over as Father-President of the California mission chain, a position he held until 1825. A program put forward on the Board for the Development of the Californias in Mexico City to send colonists to Alta California subsidized by the missions and providing them with tools and livestock was never implemented, much to Sarría's frustration. The missionaries ceased then to be a driving force behind Alta California's colonization, Sarría went on the defensive, and the arrival of new friars came to an end.

Faced with such sentiment, Sarría refused to swear allegiance to Mexico and opposition to the Spanish if they ever came back. He was condemned to exile, but the conviction was not implemented. Disputes between Mexican authorities and Sarría continued between 1826 and 1829, with Mexican authorities accusing him and his friars of concealing big fortunes.

== Death ==
When he found that it was not possible to find another resident priest to man Mission Nuestra Señora de la Soledad, he decided to take the post himself. Alone at the mission, Father Sarría carried on his work among the natives until May 1835 when his worn and emaciated body was found at the foot of the altar. Several days later the last of his loyal Indian followers built a litter and carried his body some 25 miles over the hills to Mission San Antonio de Padua, where he is interred. The missions of the Californias were eventually secularized in 1834 and converted into pueblos, towns.

Catholic Church titles
Preceded by José Francisco de Paula Señan	President-General of the Missions of Alta California; 1823–1824	Succeeded by Narcisco Durán
