= José Francisco de Paula Señan =

Spanish missionary to the Americas

Father José Francisco de Paula Señan (March 3, 1760 – August 24, 1823) was a Spanish missionary to the Americas.

== Life ==
He was born in Barcelona, Spain and entered the Franciscan Order in 1774. In 1784 he was incorporated in the missionary College of San Fernando de Mexico, and in 1787 traveled to California. There he was assigned to the Mission San Carlos Borromeo de Carmelo and remained until 1795, when he retired to Mexico and reported on the missionary conditions in the territory to the viceroy. In 1798 he returned to Alta California and was stationed at Mission San Buenaventura until his death. From July, 1812 until the end of 1815 Señan held the office of Father-President of the California mission chain. Upon Father Payeras' retirement in 1820 he was reappointed and continued in office until he died. As Presidente he was also Vicáreo Foraneo of the Bishop of Sonora for Upper California.

A month before his death he received the appointment of Vice-Commissary Prefect. Señan was familiar with the language of the Indians, and his reports and mission entries are distinguished by their exactness and beauty of penmanship. Though a very zealous missionary, Señan loved retired life. He disliked to hold office or give orders, and it is for this reason he was sometimes nicknamed "Padre Calma." The Commissary-General of the Indies directed him to write a history of the missions, and Señan in 1819 promised to comply, but he left no papers on the subject. His remains were interred in the church of the San Buenaventura Mission.

Father Señán devised a method for writing the Ventureño language which was spoken in the area at the time based on the Spanish alphabet, which also incorporated other symbols to represent sounds not present in Spanish such as glottal stops.

== Sources ==
Catholic Church titles
Preceded by Esteban Tápis	President-General of the Missions of Alta California; 1812–1815	Succeeded by Mariano Payeras

Catholic Church titles
Preceded by Mariano Payeras	President-General of the Missions of Alta California; 1820–1823	Succeeded by Vicente Francisco de Sarría
