= Porreres =

- Municipality
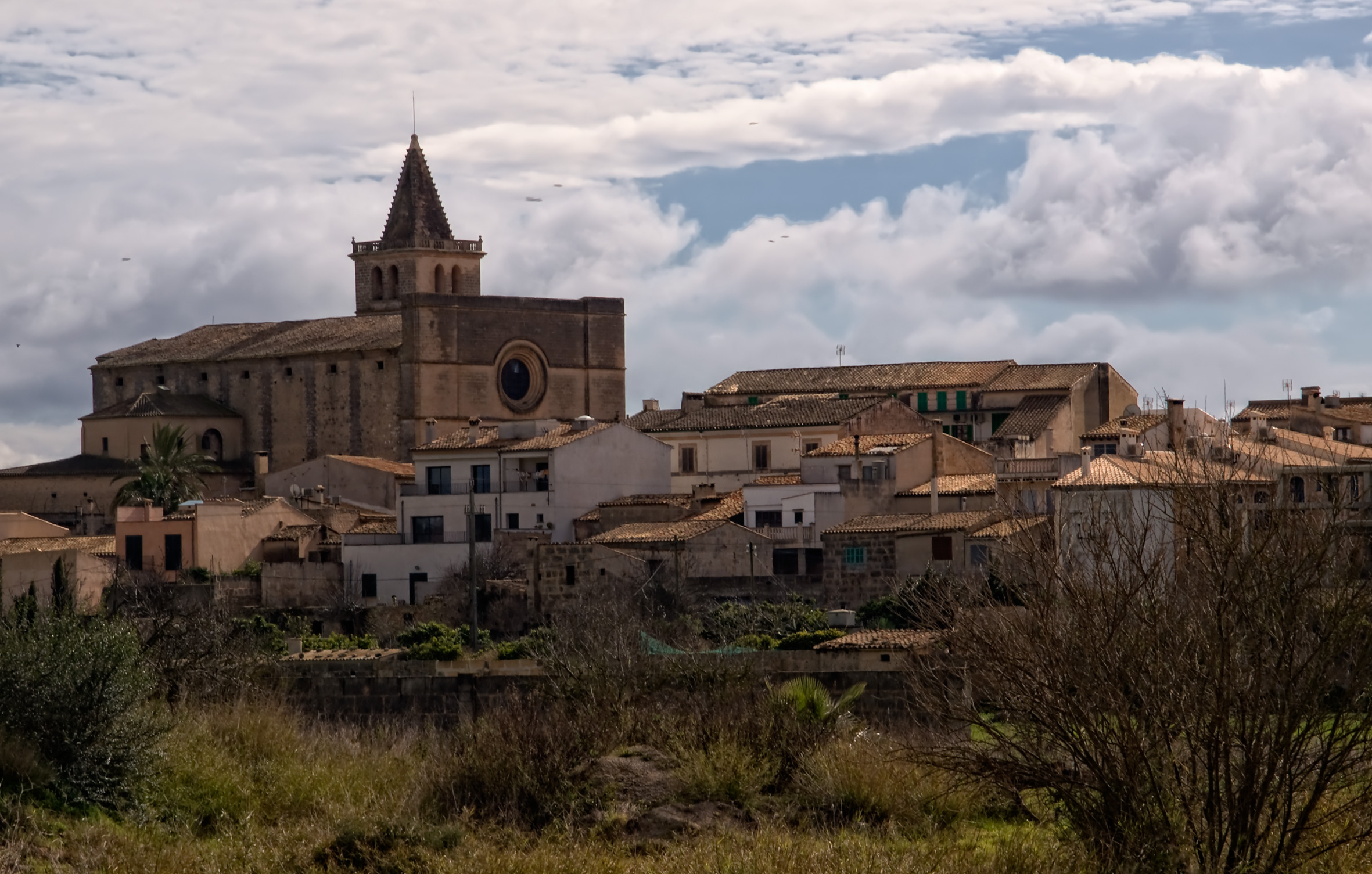
- A general view of Porreres

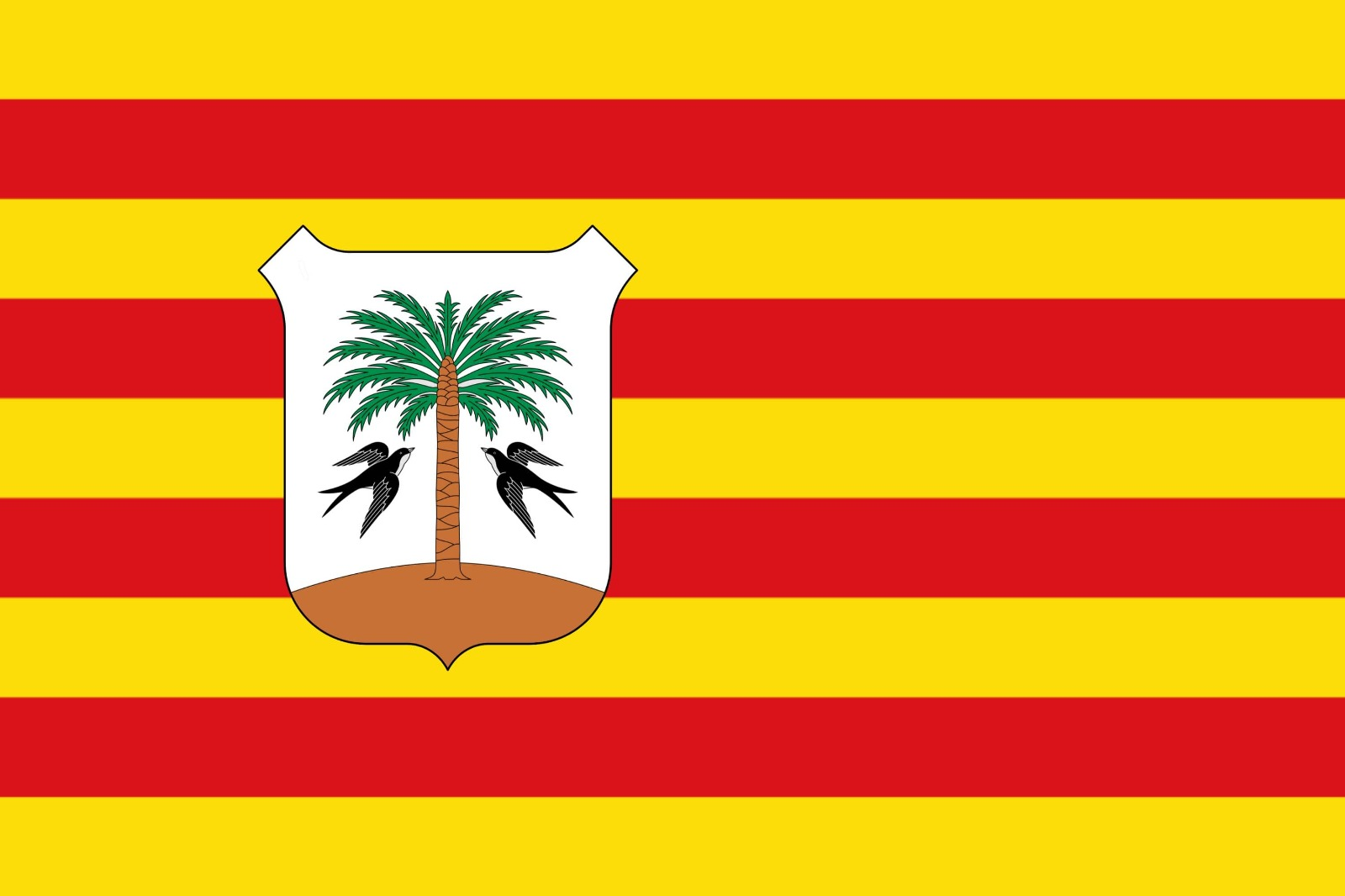
- Flag Coat of arms

- Location within Mallorca

- Location in Mallorca Porreres (Balearic Islands) Porreres (Spain)
- Coordinates: 39°30′52″N 3°01′25″E
- Country: Spain
- Autonomous community: Balearic Islands
- Province: Balearic Islands
- Comarca: Pla de Mallorca

Population (2025-01-01)
  - Total: 5,892
- Time zone: UTC+1 (CET)
  - Summer (DST): UTC+2 (CEST)

Porreres (Balearic Catalan: [poˈreɾəs]) is a municipality on Mallorca, one of the Balearic Islands, Spain.

== Notable residents ==
- Buenaventura Sitjar, missionary and linguist
