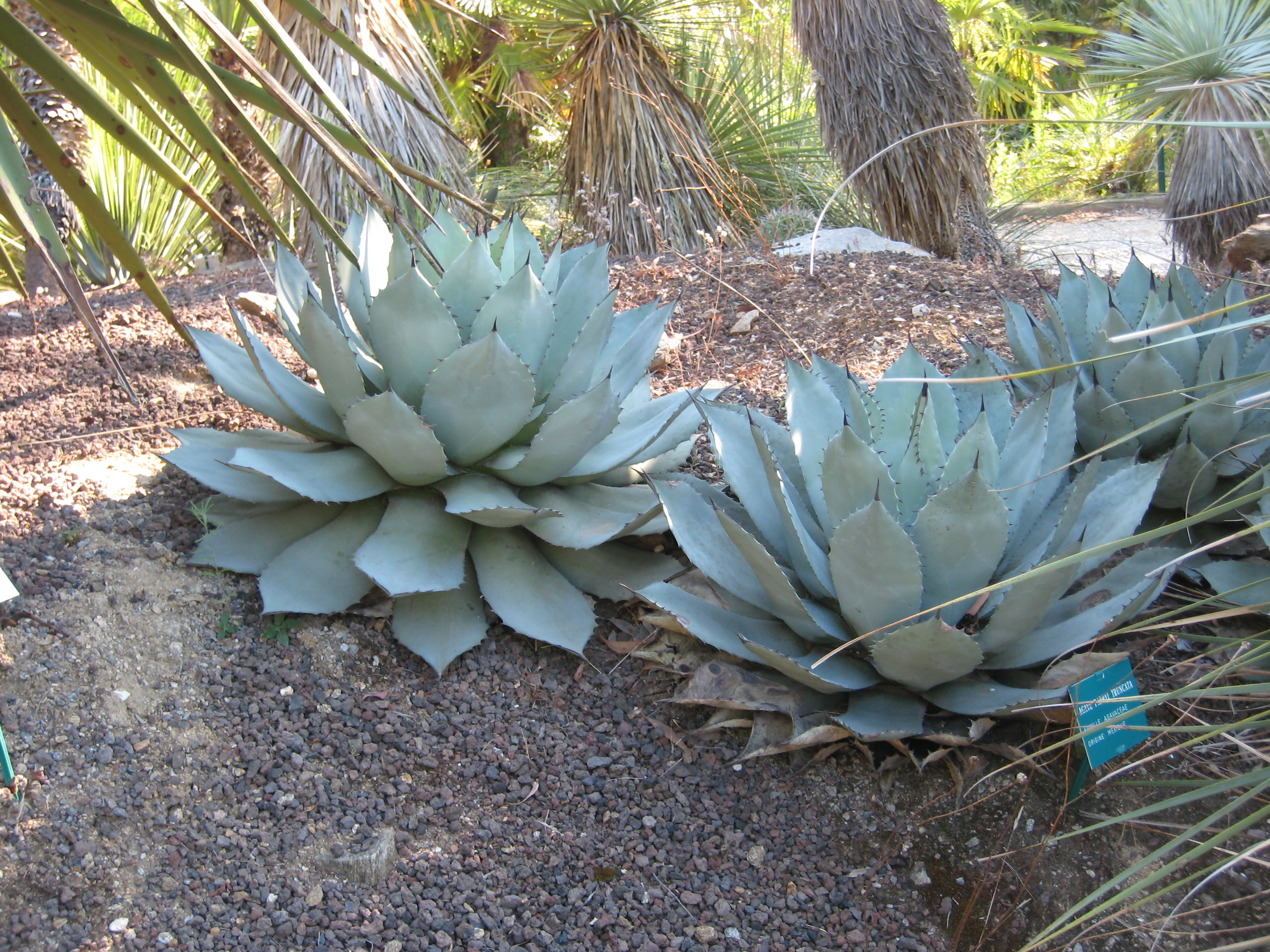

Scientific classification
- Kingdom: Plantae
- Clade: Tracheophytes
- Clade: Angiosperms
- Clade: Monocots
- Order: Asparagales
- Family: Asparagaceae
- Subfamily: Agavoideae
- Genus: Agave
- Species: A. parryi
- Variety: A. p. var. truncata

Trinomial name
- Agave parryi var. truncata Gentry

= Agave parryi var. truncata =

Variety of flowering plant

Agave parryi var. truncata is a variety of Agave parryi that forms condensed rosettes with wide, rounded, bluish leaves with red spines along their edges. They grow to 1-2 feet tall and 2-3 feet in diameter. They are commonly called artichoke agaves.
