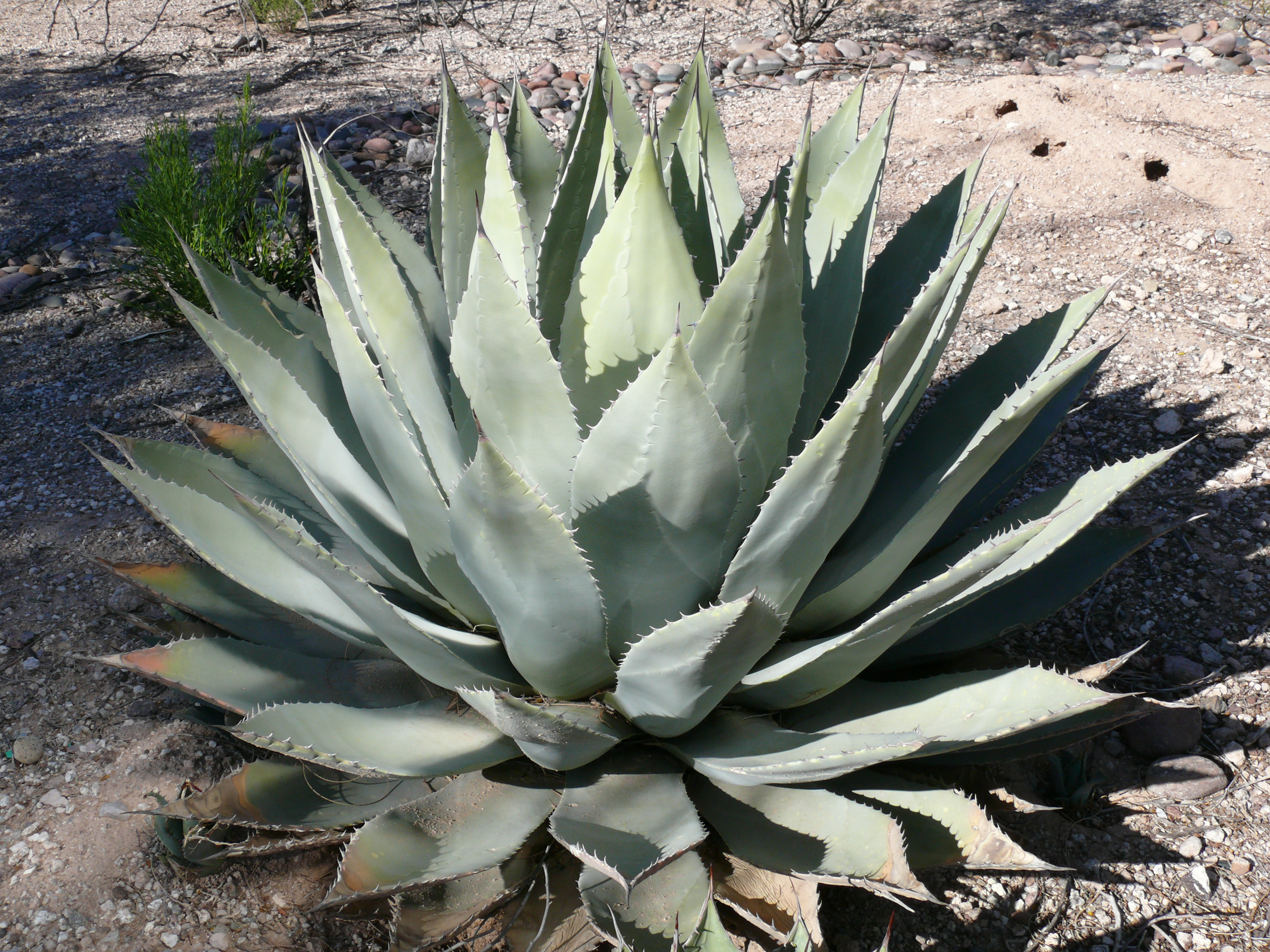

Scientific classification
- Kingdom: Plantae
- Clade: Tracheophytes
- Clade: Angiosperms
- Clade: Monocots
- Order: Asparagales
- Family: Asparagaceae
- Subfamily: Agavoideae
- Genus: Agave
- Species: A. parryi
- Variety: A. p. var. huachucaensis

Trinomial name
- Agave parryi var. huachucaensis (Baker) Little

= Agave parryi var. huachucensis =

Variety of flowering plant

Agave parryi var. huachucensis, synonym Agave huachucensis, is a variety of Agave parryi subsp. parryi. It is commonly known as the Huachuca agave.

"Agave huachucensis Sarg." (the epithet is also spelt huachuaensis) is an error; Charles Sargent referred to Agave huachucensis Baker.
