= Luis Jayme =

Spanish-born Roman Catholic priest

Lluís Jaume Vallespir

Personal life
- Born: October 18, 1740 Sant Joan, Majorca, Spain
- Died: November 5, 1775 (aged 35) Mission San Diego de Alcalá, San Diego
- Resting place: Mission San Diego de Alcalá

Religious life
- Religion: Roman Catholic

Luis Jayme or Lluís Jaume O.F.M. (October 18, 1740 – November 5, 1775), born Melcior Jaume Vallespir, was a Spanish-born Roman Catholic priest of the Franciscan Order. He was the first Catholic martyr who died in Alta California.

== Early life and education in the priesthood ==
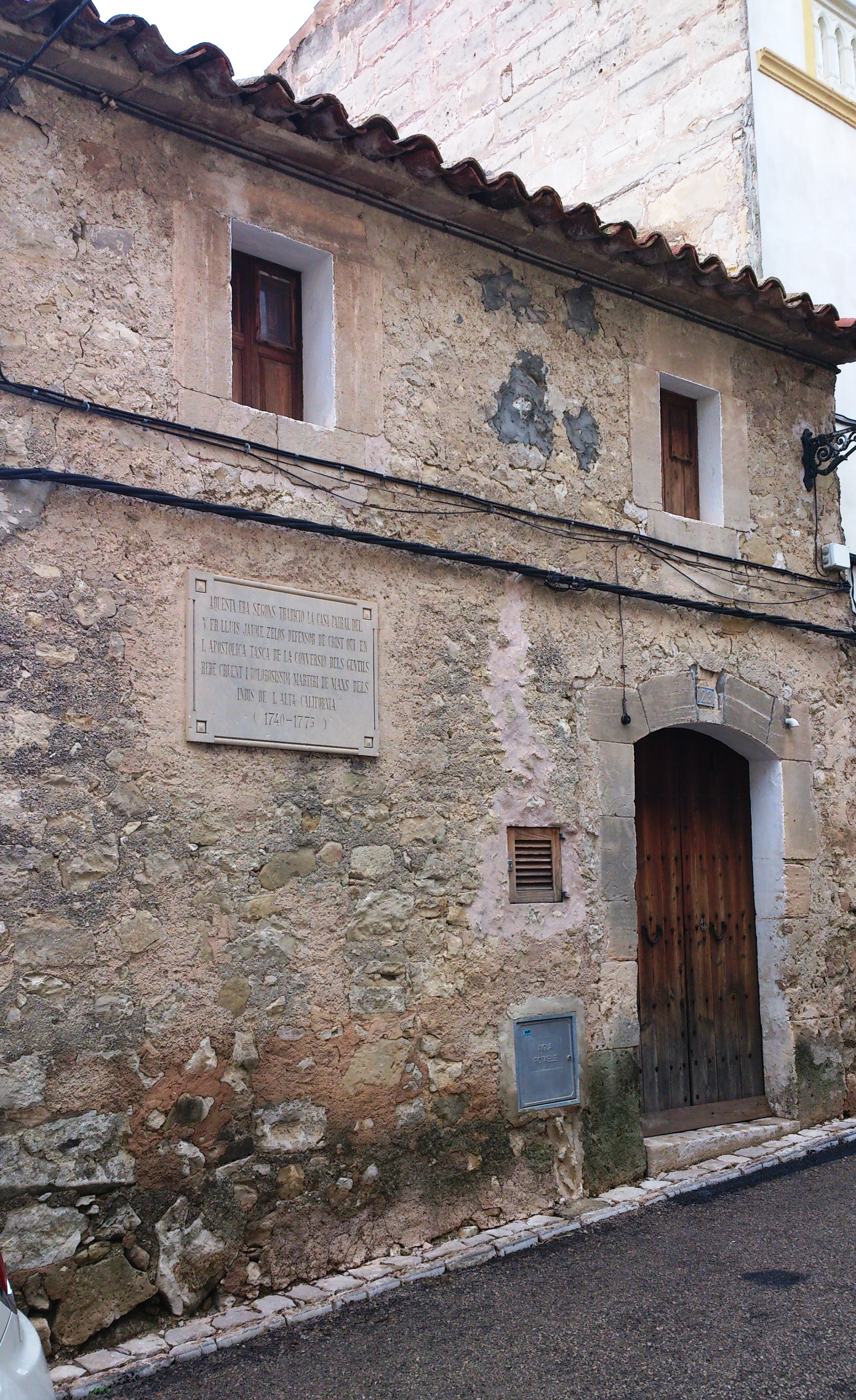
The birthplace of Luis Jayme in Sant Joan (Mallorca) in 2014

Born at the farm Son Baró in the village of Sant Joan, Majorca, an island in the Spanish West Mediterranean. Jayme acquired his earliest schooling from the local parish priest. At the age of fifteen, Jayme entered the convent school in San Bernardino, where Fray Junípero Serra had studied some years earlier. On September 27, 1760, Jayme was admitted to the Franciscan Order, in the Convento de Santa Maria de Los Angeles de Jesus. Following a year of strict seclusion and rigorous discipline, Jayme solemnly promised to observe the rule of the Friars Minor for the rest of his earthly lifespan; he was known as Fray Luis since then. The friar conducted his theological studies at the Convento de San Francisco (Palma de Mallorca) and was ordained to the priesthood on December 22, 1764.

Fray Luis became "Lector of Philosophy" upon completion of his coursework, a position he occupied San Francisco from 1765 to 1770. After learning that the Spanish had infiltrated Alta California, Jayme made a decision to apply to be a missionary in the New World. He got permission from the Commissary General of the Indies. Jayme arrived in New Spain in early 1770 after a long and arduous trans-Atlantic voyage. There he began the special training course at the missionary College of San Fernando de Mexico wherein "soldiers of the Cross" were conditioned to the privation, fatigue, mortification and penance encountered on the missionary frontier.

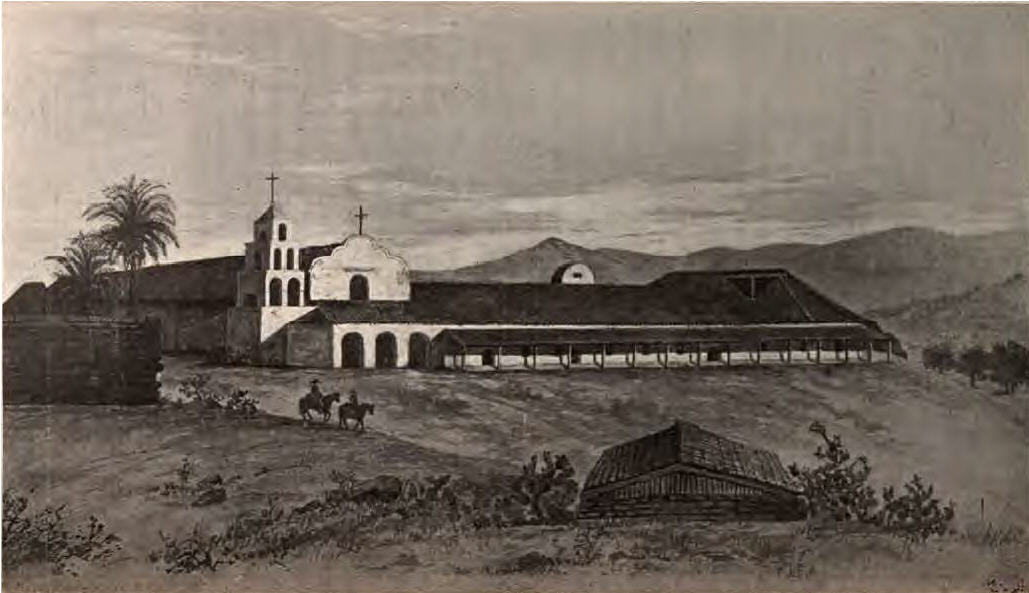
A painting of Mission San Diego de Alcalá as it appeared in 1848 depicts the original bell tower. From Mission San Diego (1920) by Zephyrin Engelhardt.

== Mission San Diego ==
On March 12, 1771, Fray Luis and nine other priests sailed from New Mexico to Mission San Diego de Alcalá aboard the ship San Antonio to begin a ten-year commitment to serve indigenous peoples. At that time, Father Fernando Parron and Jose Gomez served in Mission San Diego. Parron was forty -two and Gomez was forty-one years old. They received ten priests warmly. The supplies on the ship San Antonio were brought ashore and would then be delivered to the mission and presidio in San Diego. The ten Fathers needed to continue their voyage to meet Father Junipero Serra, the President of the California Missions, who was in Monterrey at that time. Father Gomez also left the mission along with the other priests because he was ill and was allowed to retire. Gomez's place in the mission was replaced by Father Francisco Dumetz. Later, Father Parron reported he was also ill, so Father Serra appointed Jayme to replace him. On July 7, 1771, Father Jayme and Pedro Fages, the new Captain and Military Commander of Upper California, together departed Monterrey to Mission San Diego by the ship San Antonio.

Jayme's earliest efforts were devoted to mastering the complexities of the local Kumeyaay language. Once he had gained a facility with its vocabulary, he was able to compile a polyglot Christian catechism. On April 3, 1773, Jayme wrote a letter to Serra, who was in Mexico. Before leaving Mexico City, Serra received Luis Jayme's letter. In the letter, Jayme mainly talked about the relocation of Mission San Diego. The lack of a dependable water supply, coupled with the proximity of the military personnel at the Presidio, led to Jayme to ask for and being granted permission to relocate the mission from its original site, atop Presidio Hill, to the valley several miles east, where it is now situated. Serra's superior knew about this letter and cite some of Jayme's words in his letter to the Viceroy Antonio María de Bucareli on August 12, 1773. In the end, Viceroy Bucareli agreed to move the mission to a new location, less than two leagues from the Royal Presidio. Serra arrived at San Diego Mission from Mexico on March 13, 1774, and left the mission on April 6, 1774. During this period, Serra should have some conversations with Jayme about moving the mission site. On January 8, 1775, Serra wrote Bucarelli a letter informing him that the site of Mission San Diego had moved to a new location in August 1774. Almost immediately there was a noticeable increase in the number of conversions which, by 1775, stood at 431.

== Tensions in Mission San Diego ==
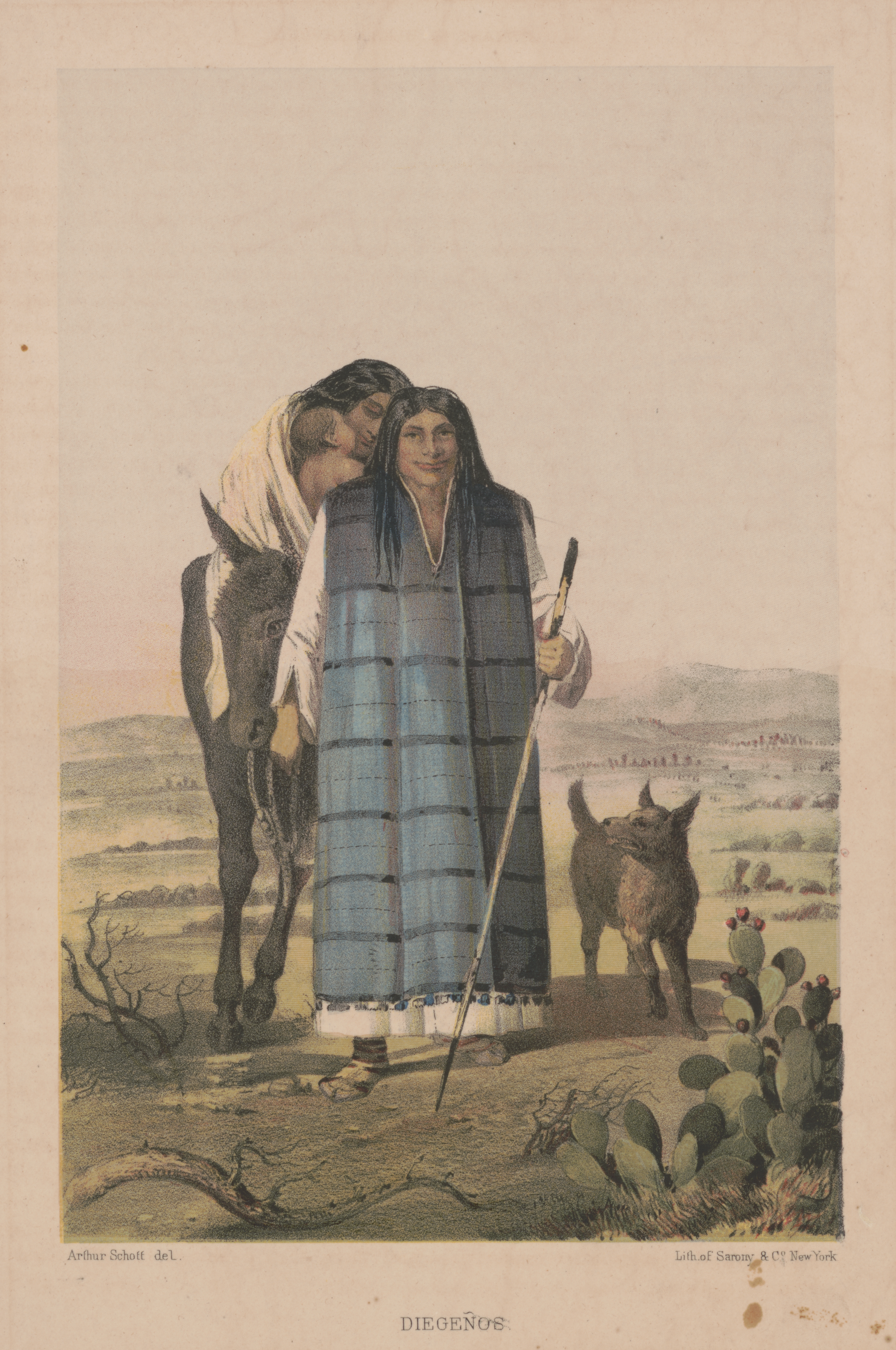
Local Kumeyaay. Engraving by Arthur Carl Victor Schott, Sorony & Co., 1857

Luis Jayme had a hard time on the mission because several clashes broke out between Jayme and regional commander Fages. Jayme reported in a letter dated 17 October 1772 that some soldiers had raped Kumeyaay women near the Mission San Diego. When the locals saw a Spaniard coming, they fled to the woods with their women. So it was difficult for the missionaries to do their Christian work. Also, the local Indians were angry with some lazy soldiers who ran cattle into their farmland. Jayme complained these to Fages that Indians attacked missionaries because Presidio soldiers abused Indians and raped Indian women. But, Fages ignored the requests from Jayme. The Franciscans missionaries and the military were two powerful Spanish groups in Alta California. Both of them wanted to extend their authority in the same area. Some military professional officers were "influenced by Enlightenment ideas about equality and liberty," so they did not agree with "the paternalism which the mission system imposed on the indigenous peoples." Moreover, the military side was not satisfied with the mission system's attempt to occupy all the materials.

On the other hand, some of the local Kumeyaay people resented the Spanish intrusion into their land. Luis Jayme and his mission "intensified their conversion efforts and pushed farther into the interior of San Diego." Natives were worried because the new mission site was too close to their ranches. On October 3, 1775, sixty converted Indians were baptized in Mission San Diego. Local Indian people and especially the religious leaders felt the more serious threat from the Spaniards and they "believed the priests to be powerful and potentially dangerous shamans." Thus, the relations between Jayme's Mission and the natives of San Diego were already strained before the riots of 1775.

== Death ==
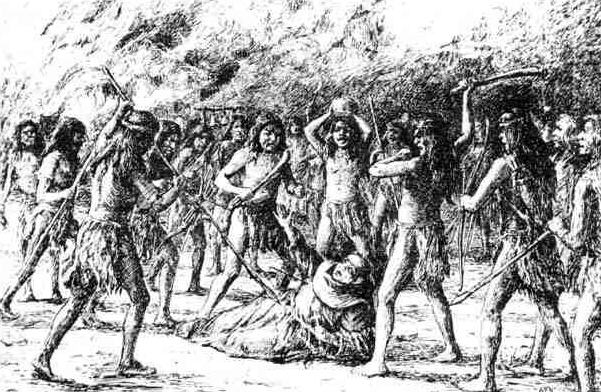
An illustration depicts the killing of Father Luis Jayme by Kumeyaay warriors at Mission San Diego de Alcalá, on November 4, 1775.

The tension and animosity at last broke out at Mission San Diego. Local Kumeyaay people hated "European intrusion and resisted conversion," so they gathered local Indian people from the forty ranches. Francisco Palóu recorded "Account of the Cruel Martyrdom of the Venerable Fr, Luis Jayme, and of the Lamentable Tragedy at Mission San Diego." At approximately 1:30 a.m., on the moonlit morning of November 4, 1775, more than 600 warriors from the surrounding rancherías silently crept into the mission compound. After plundering the chapel, they set the other buildings ablaze. The commotion soon awakened the two missionaries, the Spanish guards, and the Christian neophytes. Rather than run to the stock hold for shelter, Fray Luis walked toward the band of warriors, uttering the traditional Franciscan greeting: "Amar a Dios, hijos!"—"Love God, my children!" The Kumeyaay seized him, stripped off his garments, shot some eighteen arrows into his torso, then smashed his face with clubs and stones.

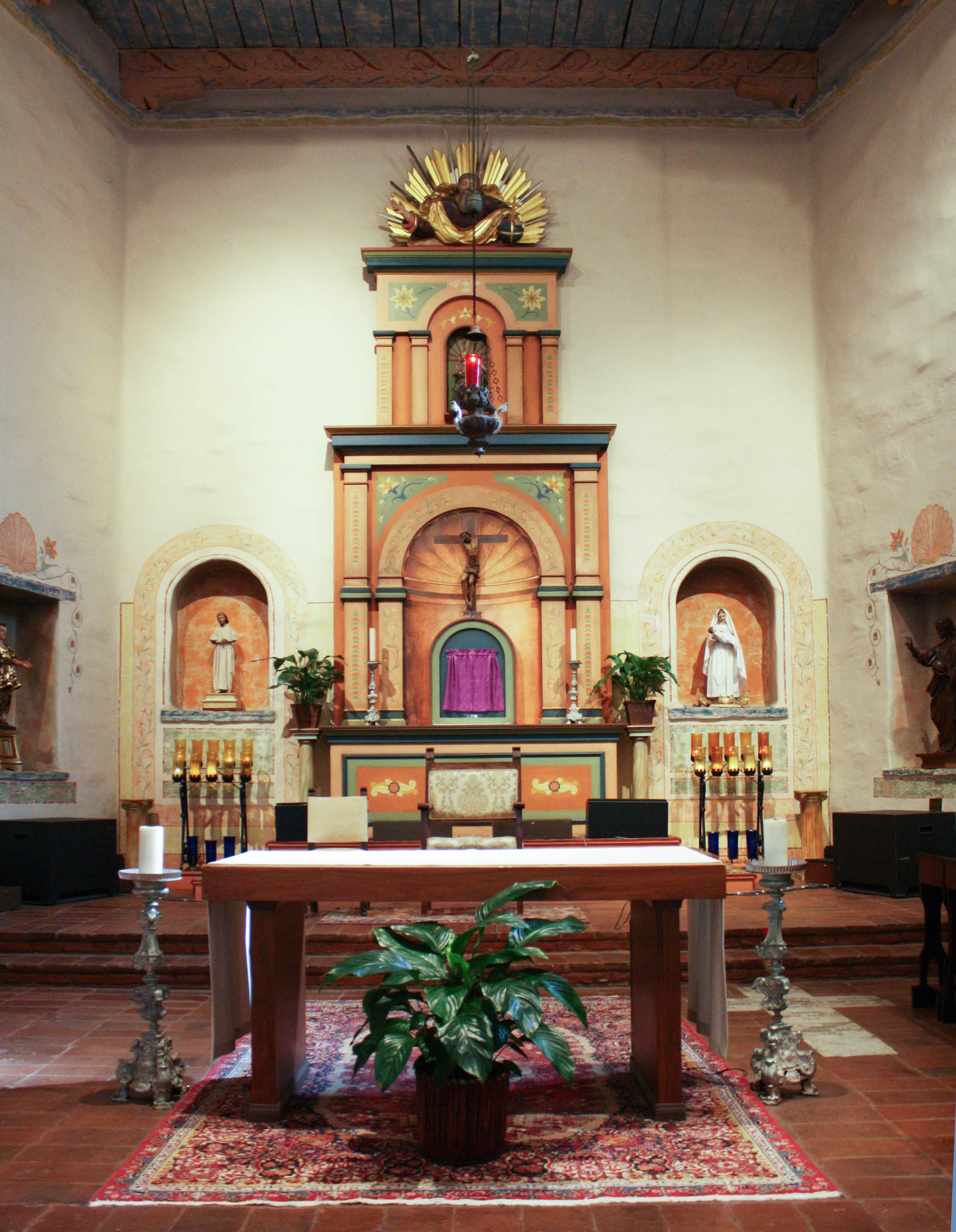
The altar of the Church of Mission San Diego de Alcalá, San Diego, California.

After Luis Jayme was killed, "the principal rancherías within a twenty-five-mile radius" were brought back to the Presidio jail. "Thirteen alleged leaders" were imprisoned for more than one year and "several of these were later exiled." Father Serra reacted to the death of Father Jayme with these words, "Thanks be to God; now that the terrain has been watered by blood, the conversion of the San Diego Indians will take place." Moreover, Serra suggested to forgive the rioter and believed the missionary should "rely upon the power of prayer rather than the might of the sword."

== Father Luis Jayme, the Martyr ==
Jayme's body was, at first, interred in the Presidio Chapel. When the new church at the mission was completed, the body was reinterred in the sanctuary. There it rested until November 12, 1813 when it was transferred once more. Today, the remains of Fray Luis Jayme lie in a common vault between the main and side altar. He is considered to be the first Catholic martyr in Alta California.
