= Andrés Quintana =

Spanish priest and missionary

Andrés Quintana, O.F.M. (November 27, 1777 – October 12, 1812) was a Roman Catholic Spanish priest and missionary of the Franciscan Order who labored at Mission Santa Cruz in California during the early part of the 19th century.

== Biography ==
Born in Antonossa, in the Province of Álava (Basque County), Spain, Andrés Quintana joined the Franciscan Order in 1794 when he was 17 years of age. Nine years later he had completed his formation and achieved the priesthood in the province of Cantabria (in northern Spain), as did a great many of the Spanish missionaries. In 1804 he sailed to the New World to join the missionary College of San Fernando de Mexico, a springboard for all missionaries doing work in New Spain. There he received further instruction and preparation for his assignment to Mission Santa Cruz. Sailing from San Blas in 1805, he arrived at Monterey, the capital of Spanish Alta California, and became one of two missionary fathers stationed at Mission Santa Cruz.

He was killed at the mission on the evening of October 12, 1812, by Native Americans under his supervision. The following notation appears on his burial record:

"[Frey Andrés was from] the province of Cantabria [Spain]. OFM Bro. José Casa Viader, minister of Mission Santa Clara, sang the mass over his body, accompanied by OFM Bro. Narciso Durán, minister of Mission San José, who learned of his passing and came to this mission. The deceased was found early in the morning dead in his bed of natural causes. [Subsequent notation:] A more thorough investigation was ordered by the military governor. During this investigation it was learned that he had been suffocated by Christian Indians of this mission and [Mission] Santa Clara. [Fr. Andrés] was summoned to the orchard of this mission where a patient feigned illness, and there he was suffocated [and his dead body returned to his quarters]."

— Santa Cruz Mission Burial 01124, October 13, 1812

According to another source, Brother Andrés was murdered because of his plans to use a metal-tipped whip to punish Native American converts. He is considered one of two martyr priests who served in the coastal missions of California. The publication of this oral history given by Lorenzo Asisara in 1878 by scholar and Native American Edward Castillo in 1989 was counted as proof that Spaniards treated Indians with brutality at missions. Later, the story was immortalized in at least one novel.

== Notes ==
- Leffingwell, Randy (2005). California Missions and Presidios: The History & Beauty of the Spanish Missions. Voyageur Press, Inc., Stillwater, MN. ISBN 0-89658-492-5.
- Edward D., Castillo (Fall 1989). "The Assassination of Padre Andrés Quintana by the Indians of Mission Santa Cruz in 1812: The Narrative of Lorenzo Asisara". California History. LXVIII (3). 2090 Jackson Street, San Francisco, CA 94109: California Historical Society: 116–125. ISSN 0162-2897 – via Archive.org.
