= Narciso Durán =

Franciscan friar and missionary (1776–1846)

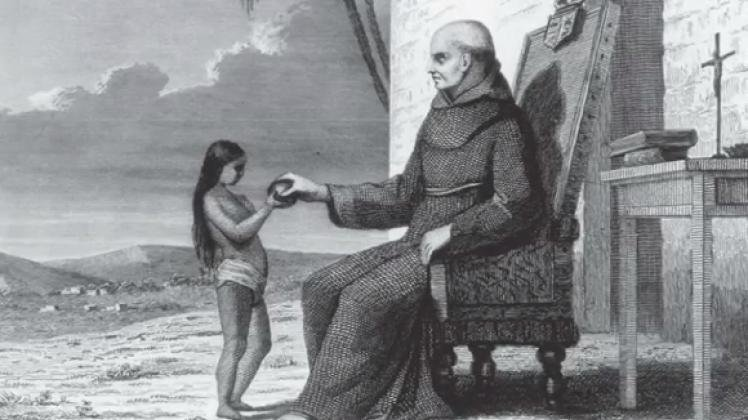
Narciso Durán and an Indigenous Californian child.

Narciso Durán, OFM (Catalan: Narcís Duran; December 16, 1776 – June 4, 1846) was a Spanish Franciscan friar and missionary.

He was born in Castellon de Ampurias, Catalonia, Spain. He joined the Franciscan Order in 1792. He was ordained priest on December 20, 1800.

In 1803, he departed for Mexico. Durán arrived in California in 1806 after studying briefly at the missionary College of San Fernando de Mexico. He served at Mission San José until 1833, when he moved to Mission Santa Barbara. A the Mission San José he arrested Jedediah Smith shortly and then released him and have him go to Governor José María de Echeandía in Monterey, California.

Under Durán's leadership, Mission San Jose became one of the most prosperous of the Spanish missions in California, notwithstanding the devastation for the Chocheño-speaking Natives, and Northern Valley Yokuts who resided at San Jose. His interests included music, which he transcribed himself and assembled a famous band of neophytes dressed in uniforms obtained from a French vessel.

Durán served as the Father-President of the California missions three times, first from 1824–1828, again from 1831–1838 and finally from 1844–1846. During his second term, the Mexican government decided to secularize the missions, and Durán moved to Santa Barbara, which was the only mission not to be secularized.

Durán died in Santa Barbara during his third term as Father-President, and is buried at Mission Santa Barbara.

== Sources ==
- Betsy Malloy. "Father Narciso Duran". California for Visitors. About.com. Archived from the original on 2008-02-20.
- Herbermann, Charles, ed. (1913). "Narcisco Duran" . Catholic Encyclopedia. New York: Robert Appleton Company.

Catholic Church titles
Preceded by Vicente Francisco de Sarría	President-General of the Missions of Alta California; 1824–1827	Succeeded by José Bernardo Sánchez

Catholic Church titles
Preceded by José Bernardo Sánchez	President-General of the Missions of Alta California; 1831–1838	Succeeded by José Joaquin Jimeno

Catholic Church titles
Preceded by José Joaquin Jimeno	President-General of the Missions of Alta California; 1844–1846	Succeeded by None
