= Vicente Fustér =

Spanish missionary in California and Catholic priest

Father Vicente Fustér, O.F.M. was Catholic a priest of the Franciscan Order, and a Spanish missionary in California during the 18th century. A member of the Franciscan Province of Cantabria, Spain, he was one of twenty Franciscans who set out from the missionary College of San Fernando de Mexico in October, 1770 to labor in the Spanish missions in Baja California. On November 24, 1771 he arrived at Loreto with fourteen of his colleagues. In the summer of 1773 the Franciscans surrendered all missions on the Baja Peninsula to the Dominicans, after which Father Amúrrio along with five other friars volunteered to work the new missions in Upper California. Upon arrival in San Diego on August 30, Fray Fustér was assigned to Mission San Diego de Alcalá to take the place of Father Tomás de la Peña.

In July, 1774 Father Fustér was transferred as supernumerary to the Mission San Gabriel Arcángel, registering his first baptisms at that station on December 28. Father Fustér replaced Father Gregório Amúrrio at Mission San Juan Capistrano in late 1779; after laboring there for over eight years, he accompanied Father Joseph Arroita to the recently established Mission La Purísima Concepción. The padre resided at La Purísima a mere two years, however, for he returned to San Juan Capistrano where he remained until his death on September 8, 1800. Father Fustér's remains were transferred to the "Great Stone Church" on September 9, 1806.
