= College of San Fernando de Mexico =

Roman Catholic Franciscan missionary college

Coordinates: 19.43944°N 99.14861°W

The College of San Fernando de México was a Roman Catholic Franciscan missionary college, or seminary (Colegio Apostólico), founded in Spanish colonial Mexico City by the Franciscan Order of Friars Minor on October 15, 1734.

The institution was established to provide specific training for priests who were to work among the indigenous populations within the Spanish colonial Viceroyalty of New Spain, located in present-day Mexico and the southwestern United States.

== Notable alumni ==
- Gregório Amúrrio
- Narciso Durán
- Vicente Fustér
- Luís Jayme
- José Joaquin Jimeno
- Pablo de Mugártegui
- Vicente Pascual Oliva
- Francisco Palóu
- Mariano Payéras
- Andrés Quintana
- José Bernardo Sánchez
- Vicente de Santa María
- José Francisco de Paula Señan
- Junípero Serra
- Buenaventura Sitjar

== See also ==
- College of Guadalupe de Zacatecas
- College of Santa Cruz de Querétaro
- Franciscan Missions in the Sierra Gorda
- Spanish missions in Baja California
- Spanish missions in California
