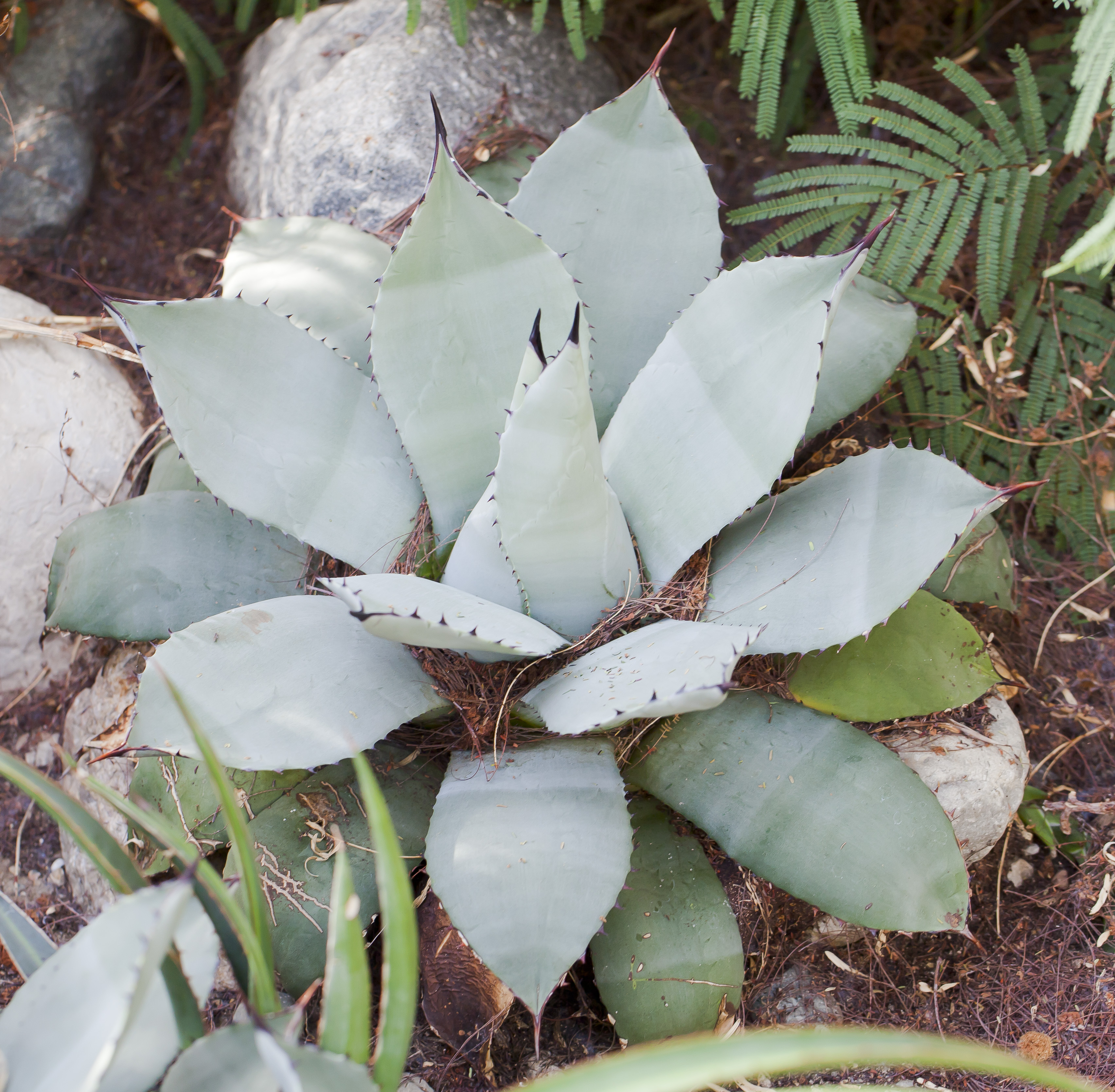

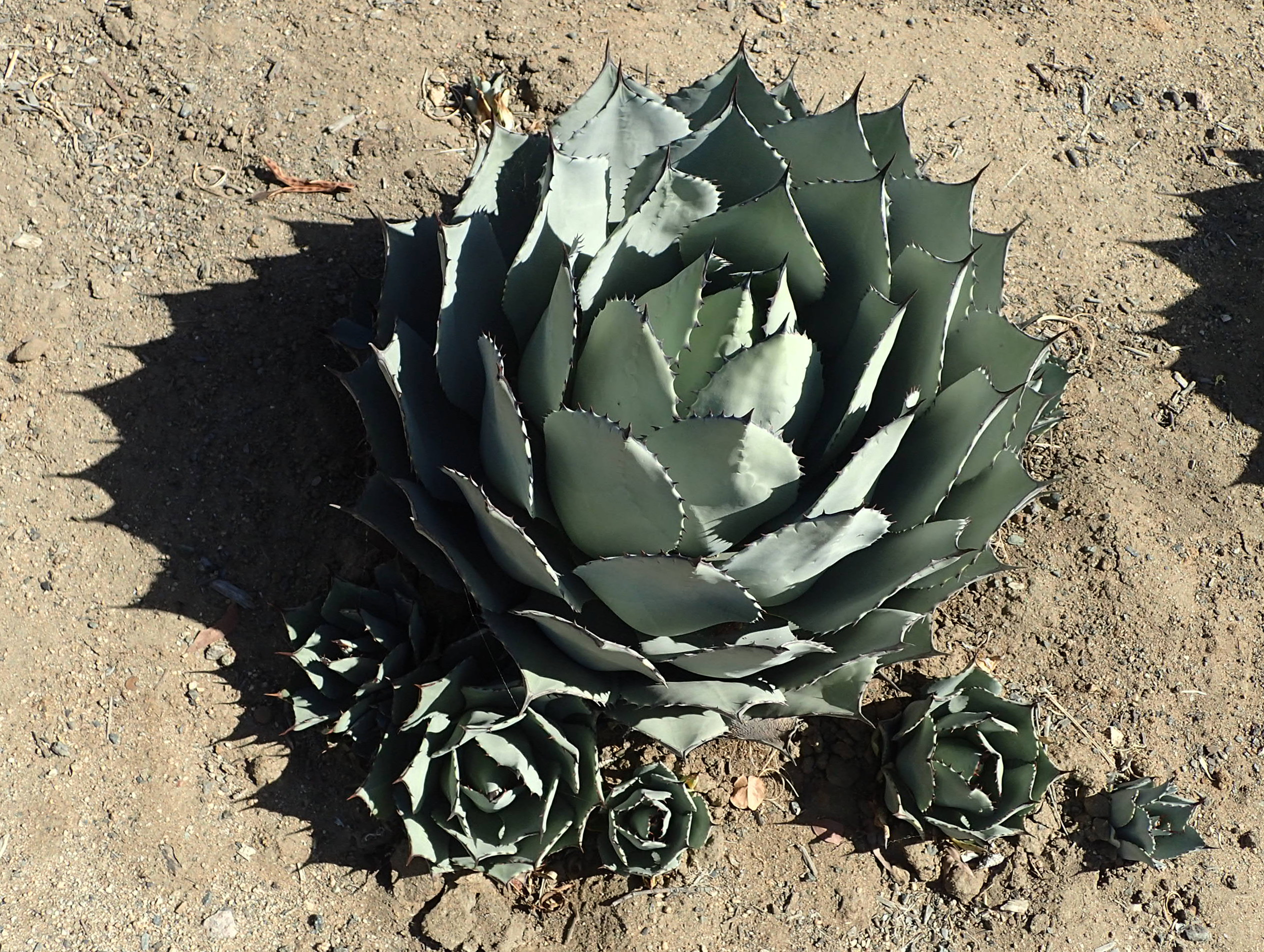

Conservation status
- Least Concern (IUCN 3.1)

- Secure (NatureServe)

Scientific classification
- Kingdom: Plantae
- Clade: Tracheophytes
- Clade: Angiosperms
- Clade: Monocots
- Order: Asparagales
- Family: Asparagaceae
- Subfamily: Agavoideae
- Genus: Agave
- Species: A. parryi

Binomial name
- Agave parryi Engelm.

Subspecies and varieties
- See text.

= Agave parryi =

Parry's agave

Species of flowering plant

Agave parryi, known as Parry's agave or mescal agave, is a flowering plant in the family Asparagaceae, subfamily Agavoideae. It is a slow-growing succulent perennial native to Arizona, New Mexico, and northern Mexico.

The leaves are grey green and have a spine at the tip. One of the distinguishing features is that the point on the tip, which is typically dark tan, brown, or black, is darker than the leaf. Indentations of previous leaves show on the back of each leaf. The Huachuca variety grows in a rosette pattern as large as 2½ feet in diameter.

Because of its compact size, plus its low water use and low maintenance, Huachuca agave is considered a good landscaping plant for desert residential landscaping. It requires full sun. It is hardy to roughly −5 °F (−21 °C), though there are reports of specimens surviving temperatures at −20 °F (−29 °C).

Parry's agave is evergreen and monocarpic—i.e., mature agaves produce a twelve-foot stalk studded with bright, yellow blooms before the plant then dies, as all energetic resources are put into the inflorescence, flowering, and pollination. Nonetheless, A. parryi is known as one of the most prolific species of Agave and can be easily propagated by removing the side shoots with a sterile, sharp knife, or by digging up any rhizomatous plantlets that have grown further away from the main plant.

This plant has gained the Royal Horticultural Society's Award of Garden Merit.

== Infraspecies ==
As of November 2025, Plants of the World Online accepted the following subspecies and varieties:

- Agave parryi var. couseii (Engelm. ex Trel.) Kearney & Peebles
- Agave parryi var. huachucensis (Baker) Little, Huachuca agave
- Agave parryi subsp. neomexicana (Wooton & Standl.) B.Ullrich
- Agave parryi subsp. parryi
- Agave parryi var. truncata Gentry, Mescal agave

== Gallery ==
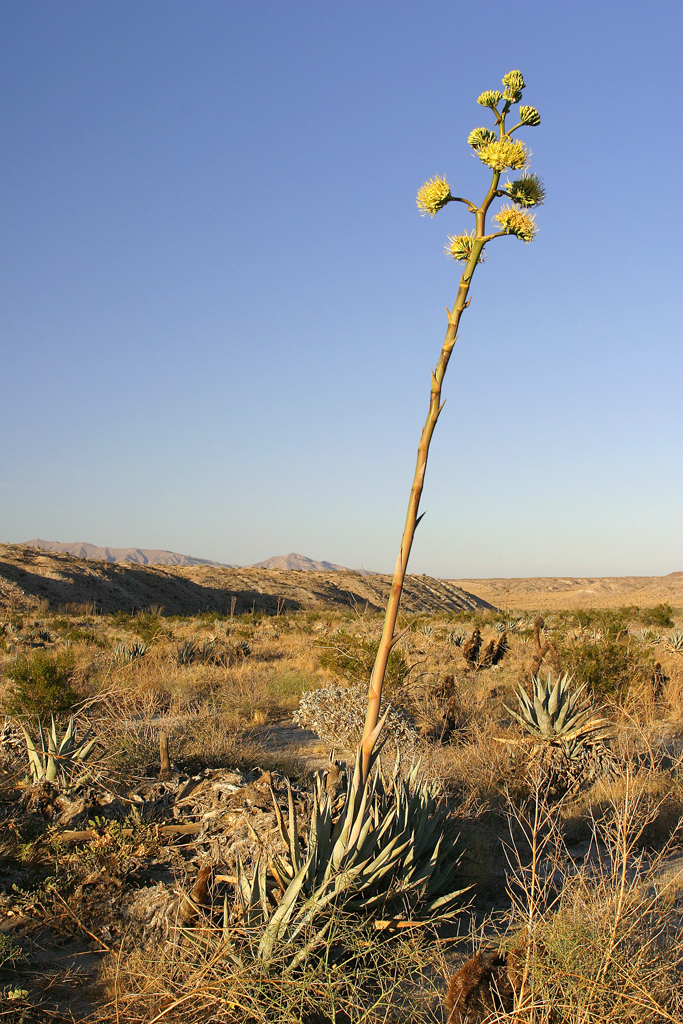

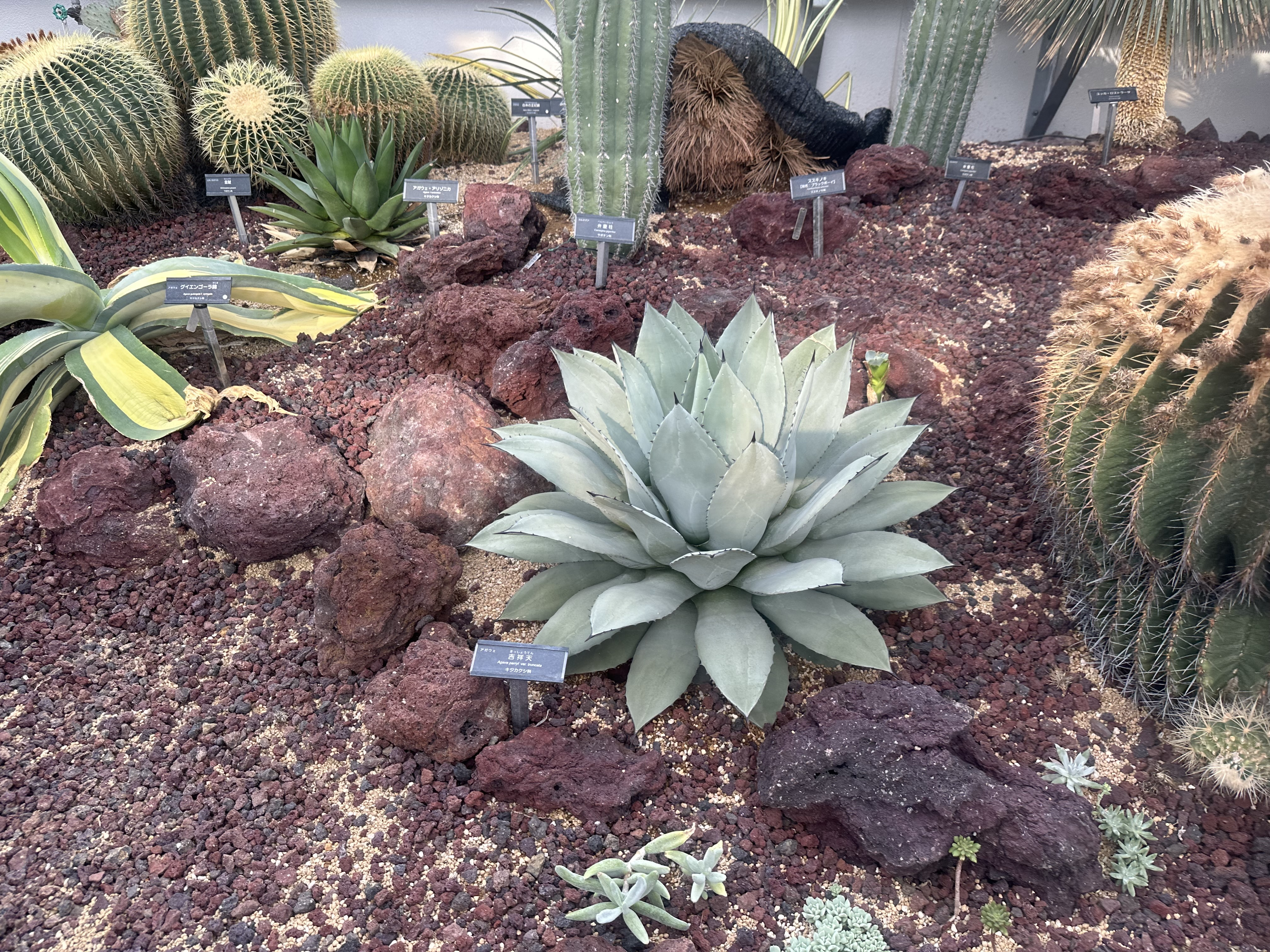

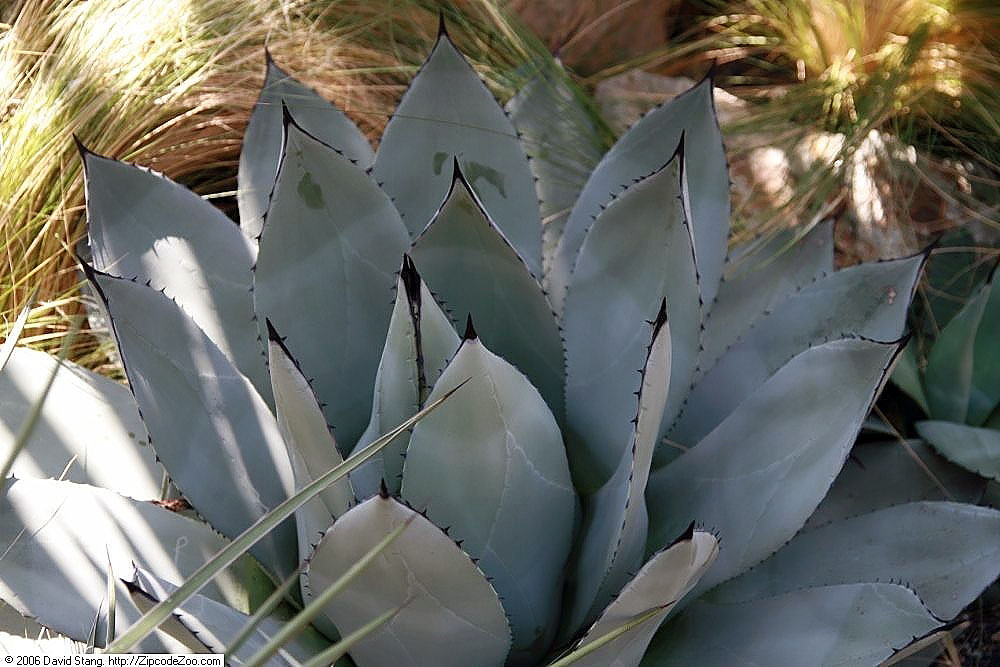

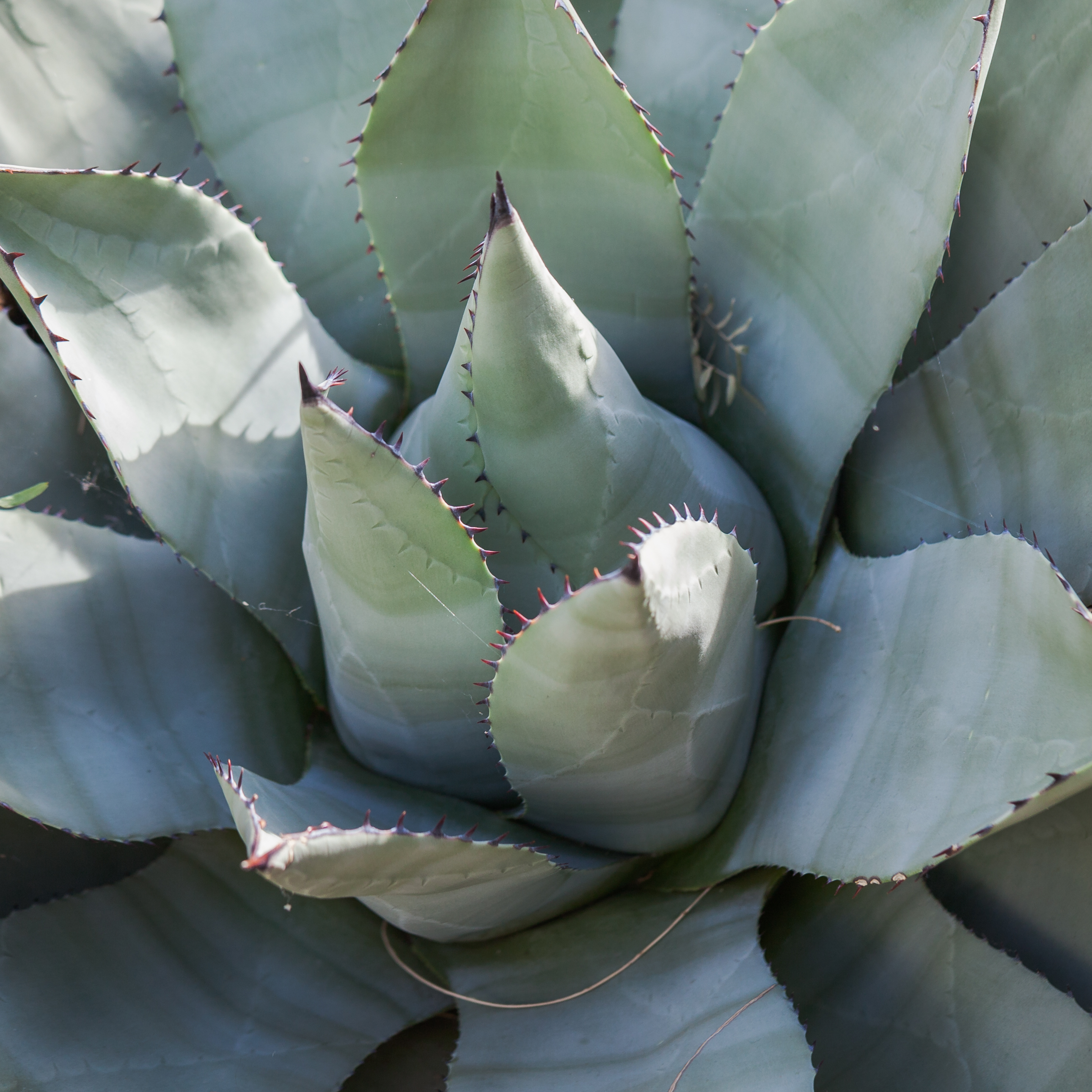

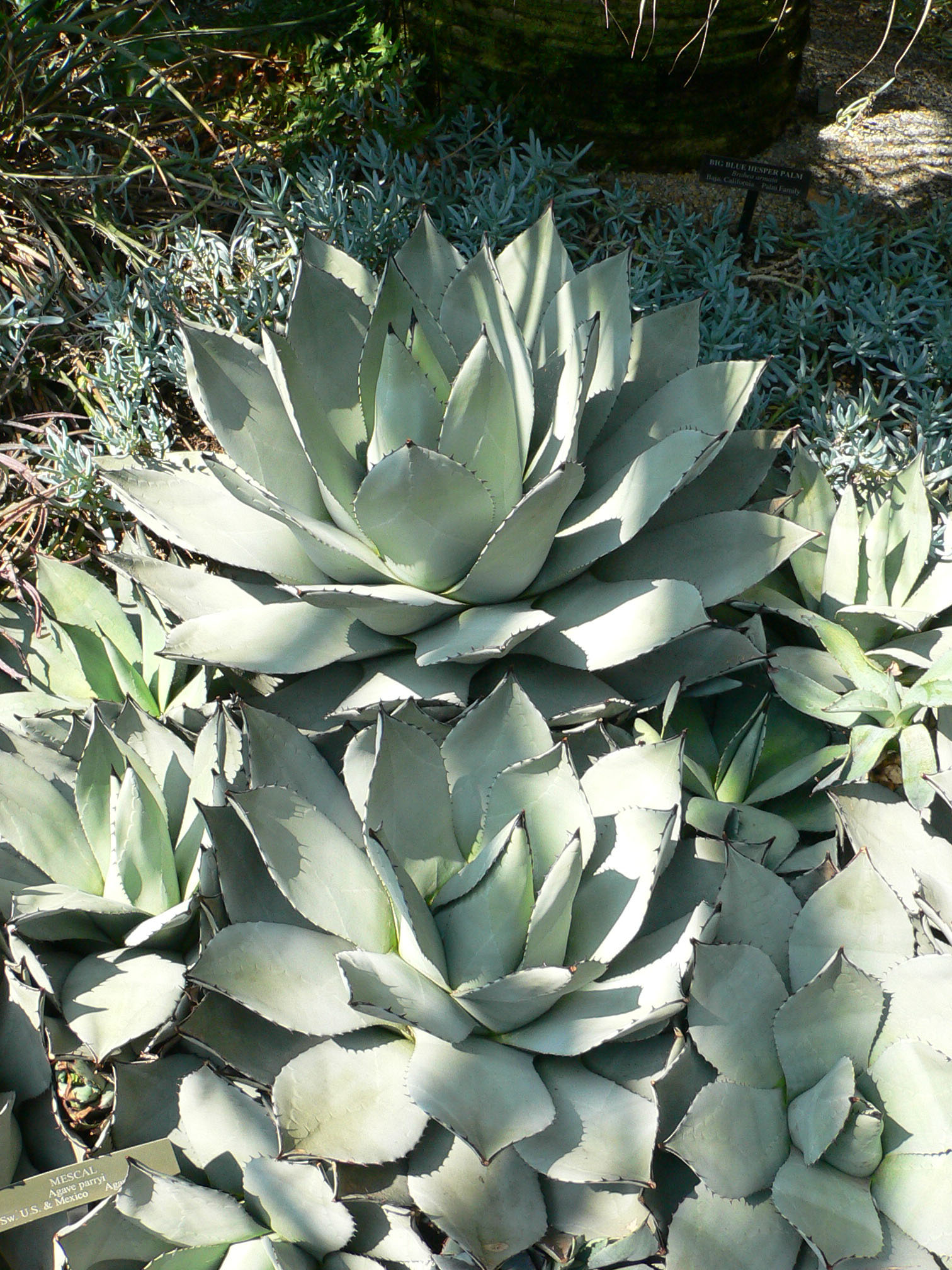

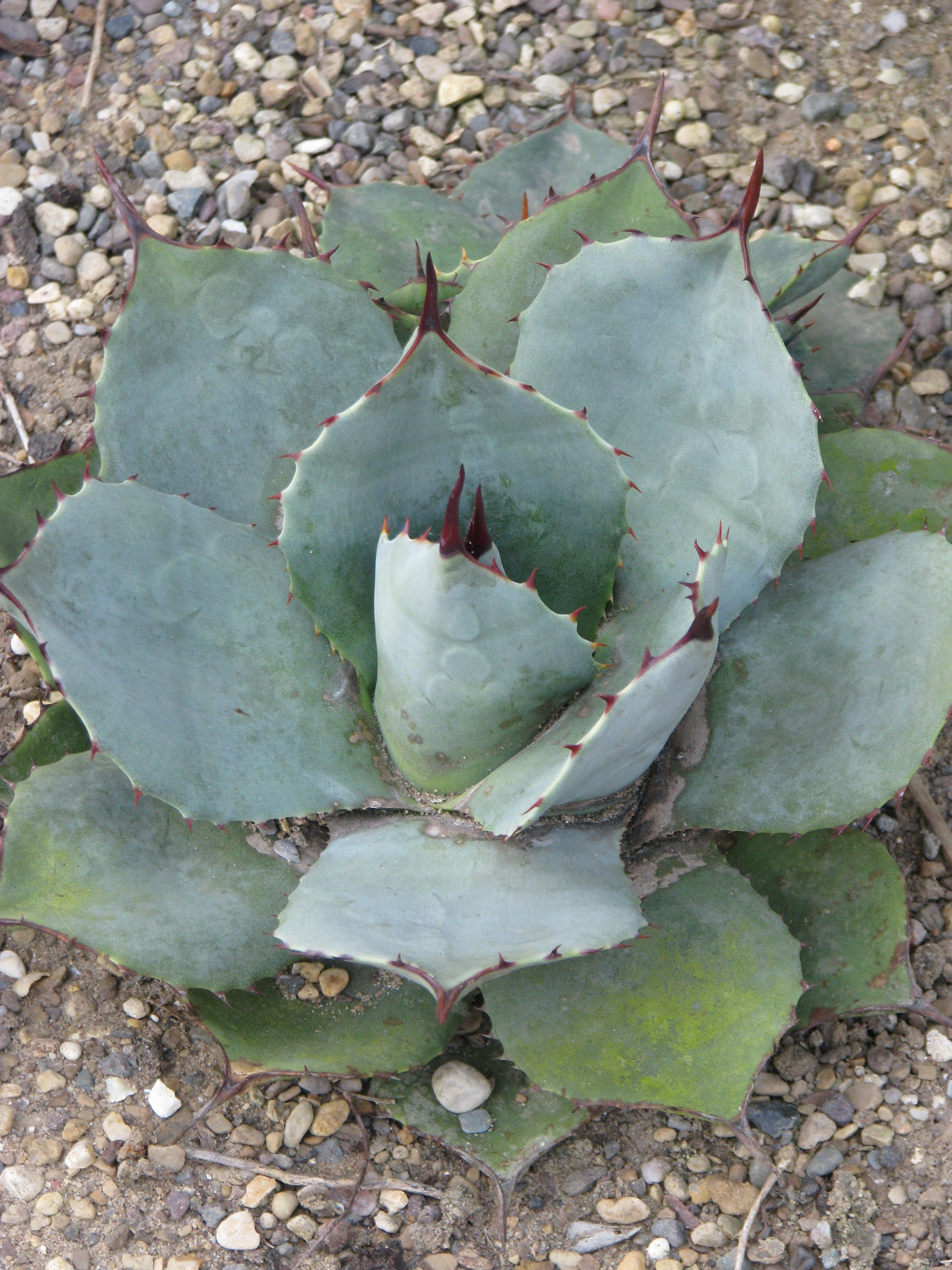

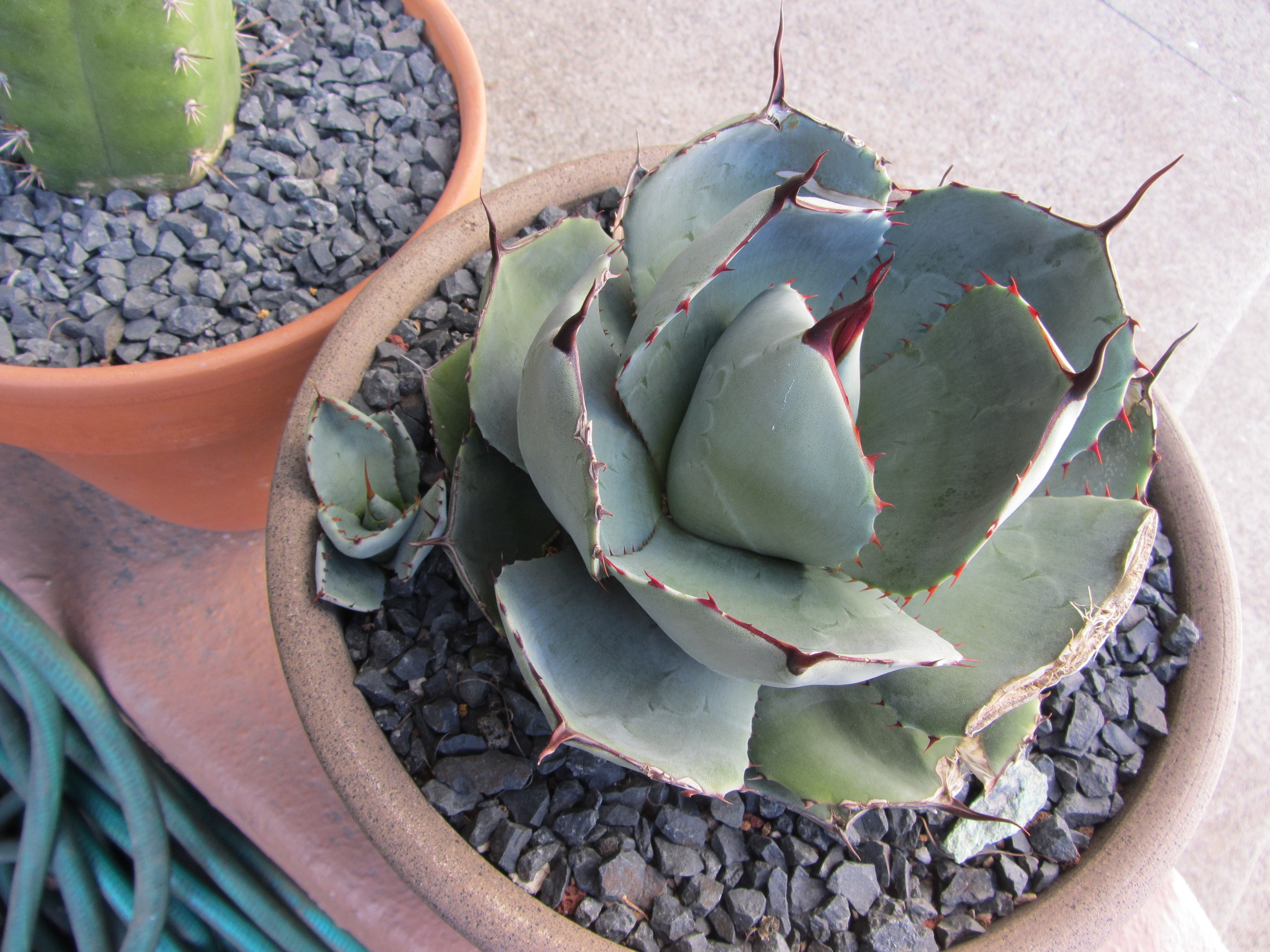

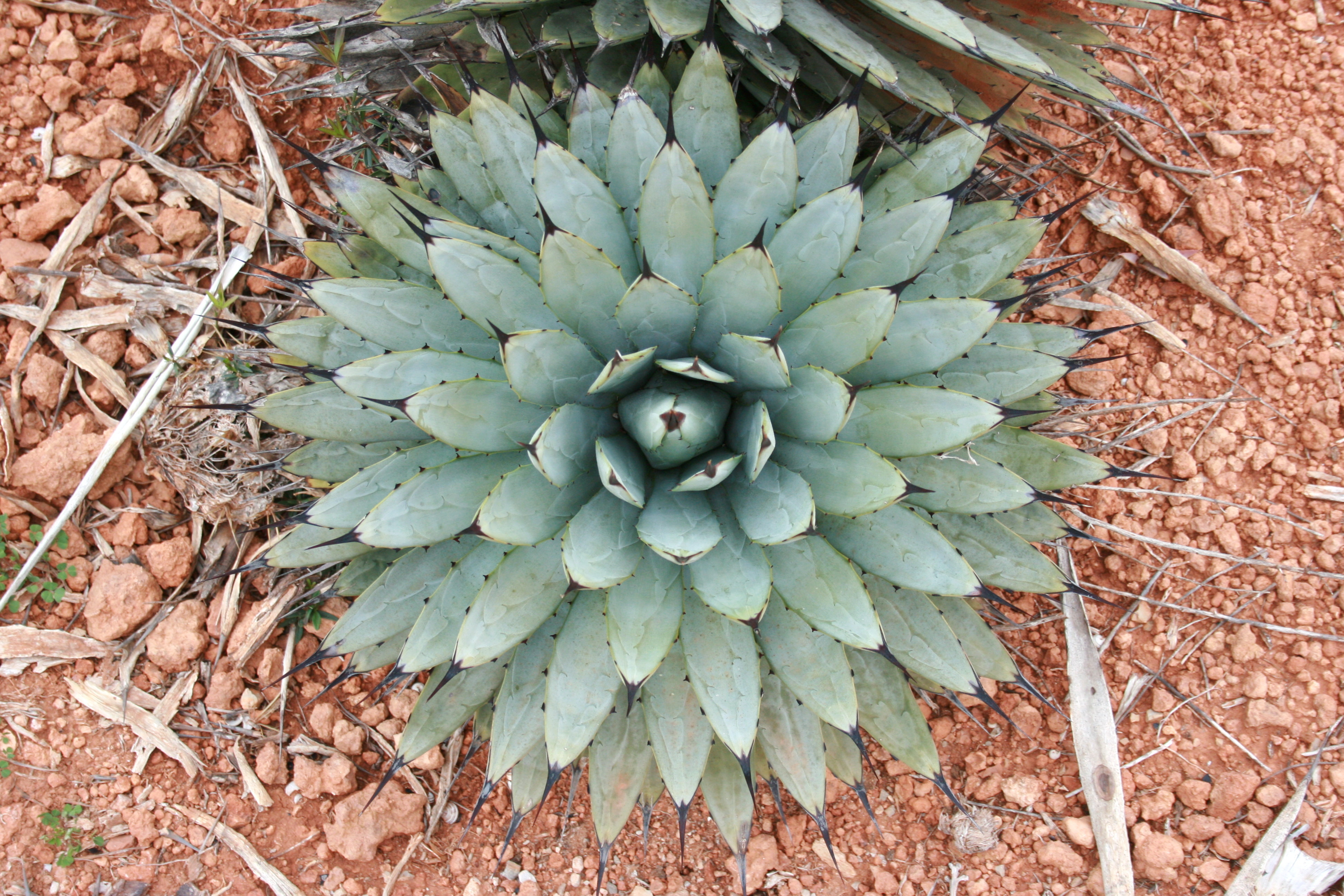

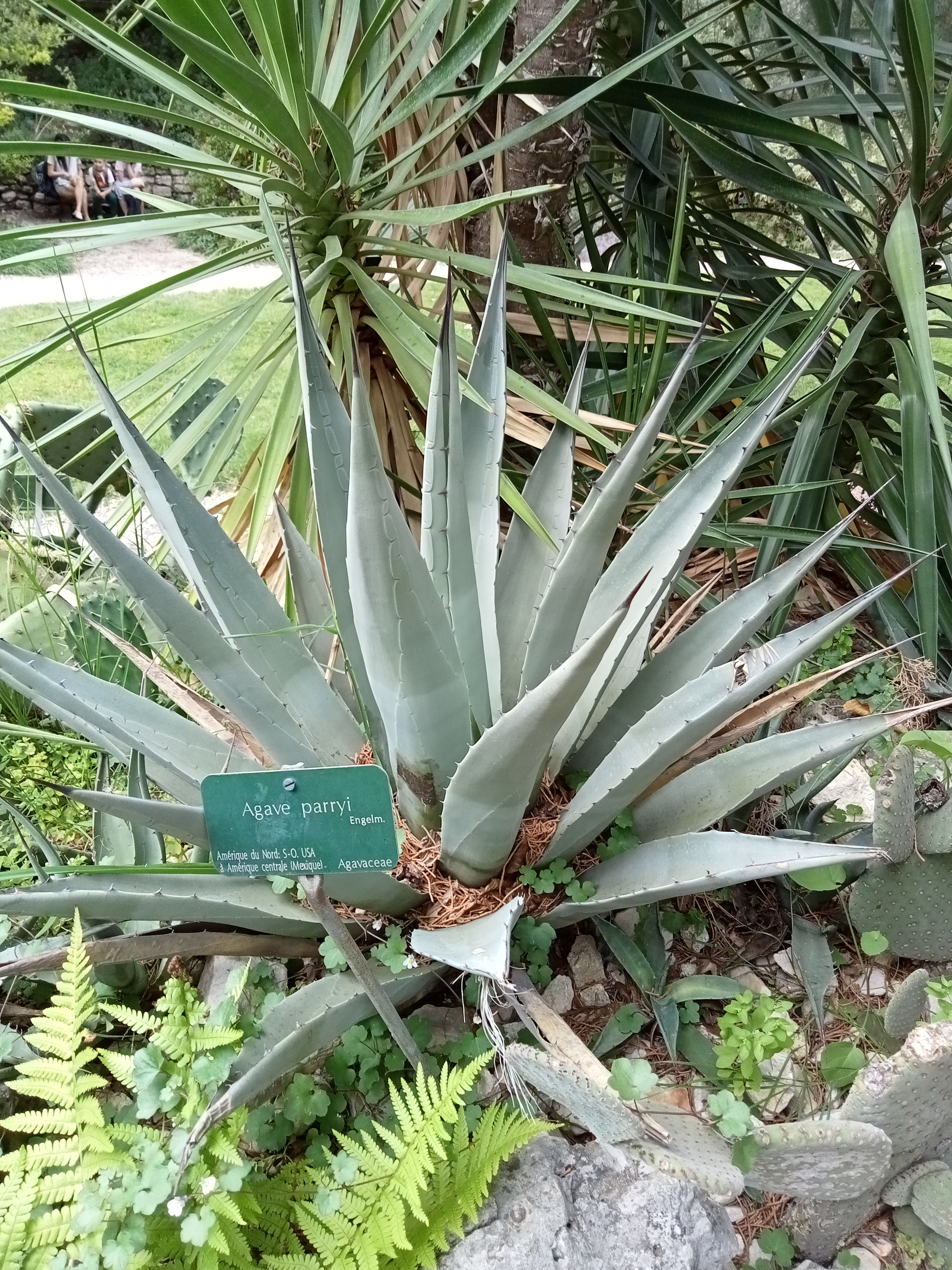

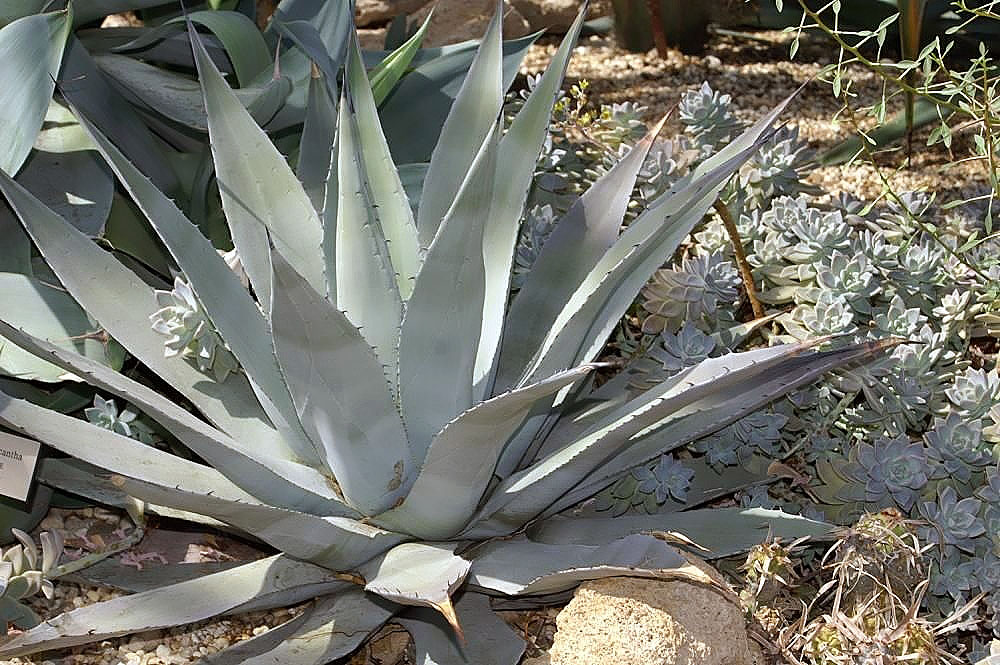
Agave parryi var. huachucensis
