= Black ant =

Black ant can refer to:

== Biology ==
A term used for eusocial insects of the family Formicidae that are black in color. It has been used to describe many ants, including:

- The Black carpenter ant (Camponotus pennsylvanicus)
- The Black garden ant (Lasius niger)
- The Little black ant (Monomorium carbonarium)
- Some ant mimics look like black ants (see Ant mimicry)

== Other uses ==
- Black Ant, a Marvel Comics character who is a Life Model Decoy of Eric O'Grady

== See also ==
- Ant
- List of ant genera (alphabetical)
- Ant (disambiguation), another ant-related disambiguation page
