= Vicente Pascual Oliva =

Spanish missionary and Catholic priest

Father Vicente Pascual Oliva, O.F.M. (born 18th century, died January 2, 1848) was a Catholic priest of the Franciscan Order, and a Spanish missionary in California during the 19th century.

== Life ==
Oliva was born in Martín del Río in the ancient kingdom of Aragon, and joined the Order in the convent of Nuestra Señora de Jesús, Zaragosa, on February 1, 1799. He left for the Apostolic College of San Fernando de Mexico on March 29, 1810; from there he departed for Alta California in early July 1811, but due to various setbacks and illness did not reach Monterey until August 1813.

Oliva was allowed to officiate over his first baptism at Mission San Carlos Borromeo de Carmelo on October 28 of that year. Soon thereafter, he was transferred to Mission San Fernando Rey de España, where he also assisted the fathers of Mission San Gabriel Arcángel until the fall of 1815. Beginning his ministry at Mission San Francisco de Asís on November 18, 1815, he continued there until the fall of 1818, when he was transferred to Mission San Miguel Arcángel. He served there for approximately two years before being called to Mission San Diego de Alcalá, where he resided until early 1832, until being sent to Mission San Luis Rey de Francia to manage the temporal affairs of that outpost. Father Oliva made his first entry in the Baptismal Register of Mission San Juan Capistrano on September 6, 1846.

Being the lone missionary at San Juan Capistrano at the time of his death on January 2, 1848, he did not receive the "last rites." Father Blas Ordáz officiated over the burial ceremony on January 29, when Father Oliva's body was interred in the presbytery on the Epistle side of the main altar in "Serra's Chapel." In mid-December 1912, the Reverend St. John O'Sullivan arranged for excavations to be made to find Father Oliva's remains, when it was found that the body had been buried in the sacred vestments worn by priests at the holy "Sacrifice of the Mass."
