= Teshaya, California =

Former Salinan settlement in California, U.S.

Texhaya, or Texja, is a former Salinan settlement in Monterey County, California, United States. It was located near the site of San Antonio Mission; its precise location is unknown.
