= Marià Paieres i Borràs =

Spanish missionary to the Americas

Father Marià Paieres i Borràs (Spanish: Mariano Payeras Borrás, Padre Mariano Payeras; October 10, 1769 – April 28, 1823) was a Spanish missionary to the Americas.

== Biography ==
He was born at Inca on the island of Mallorca, son of Pere Antoni Paieres and Gerònima Borràs and joined the Franciscan order. He received the habit of St. Francis at Palma on September 5, 1784, and left Spain in February 1793 to attend the missionary College of San Fernando de Mexico, which trained missionaries for the work among the indigenous populations. Once there, he worked at the following missions:

- Mission San Carlos Borromeo de Carmelo (1796–1798)
- Mission Nuestra Señora de la Soledad (1798–1803)
- Mission San Diego de Alcalá (1803–1804)
- Mission La Purísima Concepción (1804–1823)

When Father Tápis retired in 1812, Father Paieres was elected Father-President of the California mission chain, holding the office from July, 1815 to April, 1820. During his tenure, Father Tápis directed the founding of Mission San Antonio de Pala (Pala Asistencia) in 1816, Mission San Rafael Arcángel in 1817, Santa Ysabel Asistencia in 1818, and the San Bernardino Asistencia, founded in 1819. During the same period, Father Paieres held the office of vicario foraneo of the Bishop of Sonora, to whose jurisdiction California belonged. In 1819 the College of San Fernando elected him Comisario-Prefecto of the missions, in which capacity he, at various times, visited the twenty missions then existing from San Diego to San Rafael, a distance of more than six hundred miles.

The zealous prelate also headed various expeditions to the tribal-controlled lands of California for the purpose of finding suitable sites for new missions. Six months before his death he accompanied an expedition to the Russian settlements in the wilds of Sonoma County, and thereby most probably hastened his demise. In 1819, Father Paieres received the thanks of the King of Spain for his services during the Bouchard revolt. While in charge of Mission La Purísima Concepción he compiled a catechism in the language of the Indians, which was put to use but never published. "There was no friar of better and more evenly balanced ability," says American historian and ethnologist Hubert Howe Bancroft. "It was impossible to quarrel with him. He had extraordinary business ability, was a clear and forcible, as well as voluminous writer, and withal a man of great strength of mind and firmness of character."

He died on April 28, 1823 in Lompoc, California.

== See also ==
Catholic Church titles
Preceded by José Francisco de Paula Señan	President-General of the Missions of Alta California; 1815–1819	Succeeded by José Francisco de Paula Señan
