= Cordano =

Cordano is a surname. Notable people with the surname include:

- José Alberto Mujica Cordano (born 1935), Uruguayan politician
- Roberta Cordano (born 1963), American university president
- Rubén Cordano (born 1998), Bolivian footballer
- Virgil Cordano (1919–2008), American Roman Catholic missionary

== See also ==
- Cordaro
