= Diocese of California =

Diocese of California may refer to the following US ecclesiastical jurisdictions covering California :

- Episcopal Diocese of California
- Roman Catholic Diocese of California, also called the Diocese of Both Californias, which became the Roman Catholic Diocese of Monterey in California
  - Roman Catholic Titular Bishopric of California, a titular see based on the name of the defunct diocese
