= Pious Fund of the Californias =

Jesuit mission fund, subject of a major international tribunal

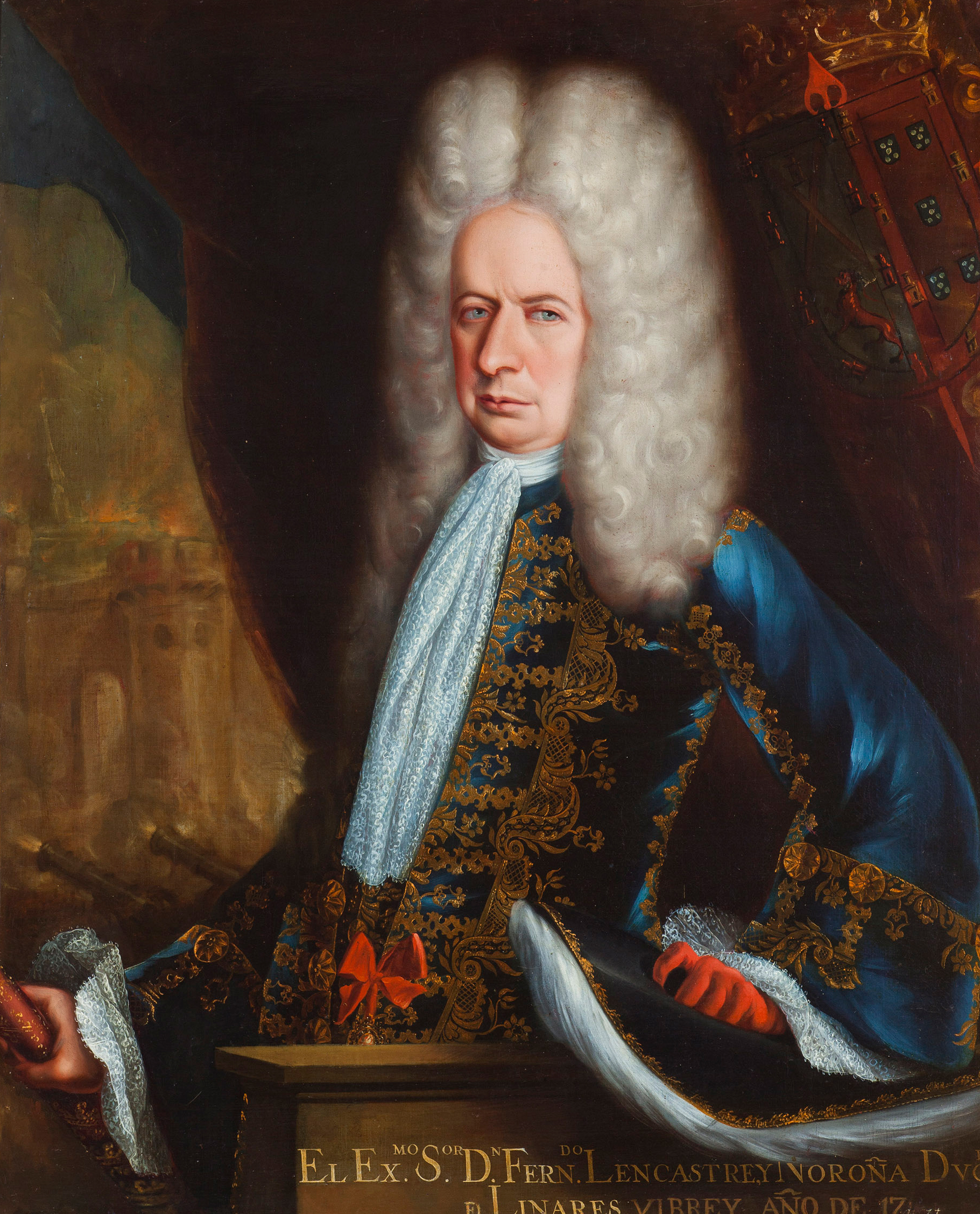
Fernando de Alencastre

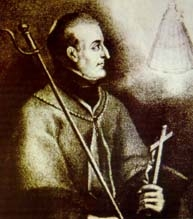
Juan María de Salvatierra

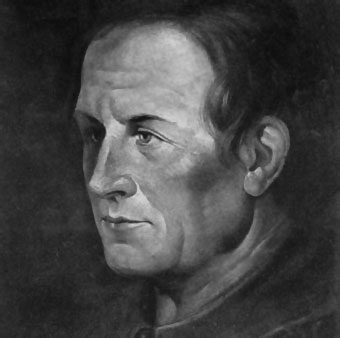
Missionary Father Eusebio Kino.

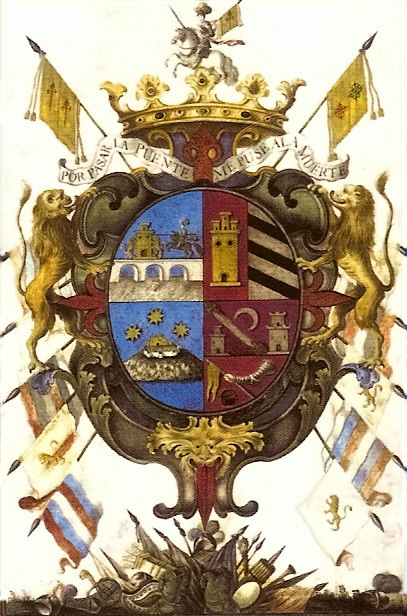
Coat of arms of the Marquis of Villapuente de la Peña.

The Pious Fund of the Californias (Spanish: Fondo Piadoso de las Californias) is an endowment, originating in 1696, to sponsor the Roman Catholic Jesuit Spanish missions in Baja California, Dominican missions in upper Baja California, and Franciscan Spanish missions in Alta California in the Viceroyalty of New Spain from 1697 to 1834, and originally administered by the Jesuits. It became the object of litigation between the US and Mexican governments in the 19th century, with the resolution making legal history in The Hague in 1902.

== Origin ==
The fund originated as an idea in 1689 when Eusebio Kino and Juan Maria Salvatierra were travelling on horseback between Magdalena de Kino (Sonora) and San Xavier del Bac (Arizona). They decided to solicit voluntary donations for the evangelism by Jesuits of Baja California's Cochimi. Donors were often merchants involved in silver mining opposite Baja California in Sonora and Sinaloa, or major merchants of the Consulado de Mexico, and finally political supporters such as viceroys. A 10,000 peso donation resulted in a 500 annual stream of interest, which 500 pesos became the income for one missionary and the operating budget of his mission. This enabled the Jesuits to establish a Spanish presence in Baja California and to propagate the Catholic Faith and an agricultural way of life in what is now Baja California; most of the Jesuit missions were in Baja California Sur. In 1767, the Spanish state expelled the Jesuits from the Spanish Empire, and used the Pious Fund to pay Dominicans to evangelize at the old Jesuit missions in Baja California as well as at new Dominican missions between latitude 28 degrees and 32 degrees, while the Franciscans established missions in upper California, both provinces of the Viceroyalty of New Spain until 1821, and then states in independent Mexico. The 21 Franciscan missions were established on the region between San Diego and Sonoma which became the US state of California in 1848. The early contributions to the endowment were managed from Mexico City, while missionaries in Baja California lived an austere life off of the stream of interest. The largest donor 1702-1741 was Jose de la Puente y Pena and his family. He was a silver merchant and judging by his donations around Asia was perhaps also a merchant in the China trade. Mission San Jose del Cabo is named after him, and the Manila galleon stopped there between 1734 and 1768. The most active missionaries were Juan María de Salvatierra (founder of many missions in Baja California), Juan de Ugarte, and Eusebio Francisco Kino (founder of many missions in the Sonoran Desert and Baja California). Poast 1741 donations took the form of livestock estates, which were arranged in a line to take primarily sheep on the hoof to Mexico City where the animals were slaughtered to provide the metropolis' citizens with meat in butcher shops; the income from the livestock estates then provided the 500 peso stipend per mission.

In 1768, with the expulsion of all the members of the Society from Spanish territory by the Pragmatic Sanction of King Charles III of Spain, the crown of Spain assumed the administration of the fund and retained it until Mexican independence was achieved in 1821. During this period (1768–1821) missionary work in California was divided, the territory of Upper California being confided to the Franciscans, and that of lower California to the Dominicans. Prior to the expulsion of the Jesuits, thirteen missions had been founded in Lower California, and by the year 1823 the Franciscans had established twenty-one missions in Upper California. In 1821 the newly established Government of Mexico assumed the administration of the fund and continued to administer it until 1840.

In 1836 Mexico passed an Act authorizing a petition to the Holy See for the creation of a bishopric in Alta California, and declaring that upon its creation, "the property belonging to the Pious Fund of the Californias shall be placed at the disposal of the new bishop and his successors, to be by them managed and employed for its objects, or others similar ones, always respecting the wishes of the founders". In response to this petition, Pope Gregory XVI, in 1840, created the Diocese of the Two Californias and appointed Francisco Garcia Diego y Moreno (then president of the missions of the Californias) as the first bishop of the diocese. Shortly after his consecration, Mexico delivered the properties of the Pious Fund to Bishop Diego, and they were held and administered by him until 1842, when General Antonio López de Santa Anna, President of Mexico, promulgated a decree repealing the above-mentioned provision of the Act of 1836, and directing that the Government should again receive charge of the fund.

The properties of the fund were surrendered under compulsion to the Mexican Government in April 1842, and on 24 October of that year a decree was promulgated by General Santa Anna directing that the properties of the fund be sold, and the proceeds incorporated into the national treasury, and further provided that the sale should be for a sum representing the annual income of the properties capitalized at six per cent per annum. The decree provided that "the public treasuries will acknowledge a debt of six percent per annum on the total proceeds of the sale", and specially pledged the revenue from tobacco for the payment of that amount "to carry on the objects to which said fund is destined".

== Controversy between US and Mexico ==
There then ensued the Mexican–American War, which was brought to an end by the Treaty of Guadalupe Hidalgo, 2 February 1848. Under its terms, Upper Mexico (Alta California and eastward) was ceded to the United States by Mexico, and all claims of citizens of the United States against the Republic of Mexico, which had theretofore accrued, were discharged by the terms of the treaty. After the Treaty of Guadalupe Hidalgo and indeed for some years before, Mexico made no payments for the benefit of the missions. The archbishop and bishops of the US State of California claimed that as citizens of the United States, they were entitled to demand and receive from Mexico for the benefit of the missions within their diocese a proper proportion of the sums that Mexico had assumed to pay in its legislative decree of 24 October 1842.

By a convention between the United States and Mexico, concluded 4 July 1868 and proclaimed 1 February 1869, a Mexican and American Mixed Claims Commission was created to consider and adjudge the validity of claims held by citizens of either country against the government of the other which had arisen between the date of the Treaty of Guadalupe Hidalgo and the date of the convention creating the commission. To this commission the prelates of California (former Alta California), in 1869, presented their claims against Mexico for such part of 21 years' interest on the Pious Fund (accrued between 1848 and 1869) payable under the terms of the Santa Ana decree of 1842, as was properly apportionable to the missions of 'upper' California state ('lower' Baja California having remained Mexican territory).

Upon the submission of the claim for decision, the Mexican and American commissioners disagreed as to its proper disposition, and it was referred to the umpire of the commission, Sir Edward Thornton, then British Ambassador to the US. On 11 November 1875, the umpire rendered an award in favor of the archbishop and bishops of California. By that award, the value of the funds at the time of its sale in 1842 was finally fixed at $1,435,033. The annual interest on that sum at 6% (the rate being fixed by the decree of 1842) amounted to $86,101.98 and for the years between 1848 and 1869 totaled $1,808,141.58. The umpire held that of this amount, one-half should equitably be held apportionable to the missions of Upper California, located in American territory, and therefore awarded to the United States for the account of the archbishop and bishops of California $904,070.79. This judgment was paid in gold by Mexico in accordance with the terms of the convention of 1868, in thirteen annual installments.

=== Case before the Permanent Court of Arbitration ===
The Pious Fund of the Californias
- Court: Permanent Court of Arbitration
- Full case name: The Pious Fund of the Californias (United States v. Mexico)
- Decided: October 14, 1902

Court membership
- Judges sitting: Henning Matzen, president, elected by panel Sir Edward Fry, named by USA; Friedrich Martens, named by USA; Tobias Asser, named by Mexico; Alexander de Savornin Lohman, named by Mexico

Case opinions
- Decision by: Unanimous panel

Mexico, however, then disputed its obligation to pay any interest accruing after the period covered by the award of the Mixed Claims Commission (that is, after 1869), and diplomatic negotiations were opened by the Government of the United States with the Government of Mexico, which resulted, after some years, in the signing of a protocol between the two Governments on 22 May 1902, by which the question of Mexico's liability was submitted to the Permanent Court of Arbitration in The Hague. This was the first International controversy submitted to the tribunal. By the terms of the protocol, the Arbitral court was to decide first whether the liability of Mexico to make annual payments to the United States for the account of the Roman Catholic bishops of California had been rendered res judicata by the award of the Mixed Claim Commission, and second, if not, whether the claim of the United States, that Mexico was bound to continue such payments, was just.

On 14 October 1902, the tribunal at The Hague made an award judging that the liability of Mexico was established by the principle of res judicata, and by virtue of the arbitral sentence of Sir Edward Thornton, as umpire of the Mixed Claim Commission; that in consequence the Mexican Government was bound to pay the United States, for the use of the Roman Catholic archbishop and bishops of California the sum of $1,420,682.67, in extinguishment of the annuities which had accrued from 1869 to 1902, and was under the further obligation to pay perpetually an annuity of $43,050.99, in money having legal currency in Mexico.

Mexico continued to make the required annual payment from 1903 to 1912, when transfers were suspended because of the Mexican Revolution. Mexico did not resume payment until 1966, and then negotiated a final lump-sum settlement of US$719,546 to the United States—essentially 53 years of back payments, with interest—in return for the termination of all future obligations with respect to the Pious Fund.

== See also ==
- Spanish missions in Baja California
- Spanish missions in the Sonoran Desert
- Spanish missions in Arizona
- Spanish missions in California
- The Roman Catholic Church and Colonialism
- Spanish colonization of the Americas

== Sources ==
- "Pious Fund Arbitration", The New York Times, September 16, 1902
