= Brian Moore (political activist) =

American politician (born 1943)

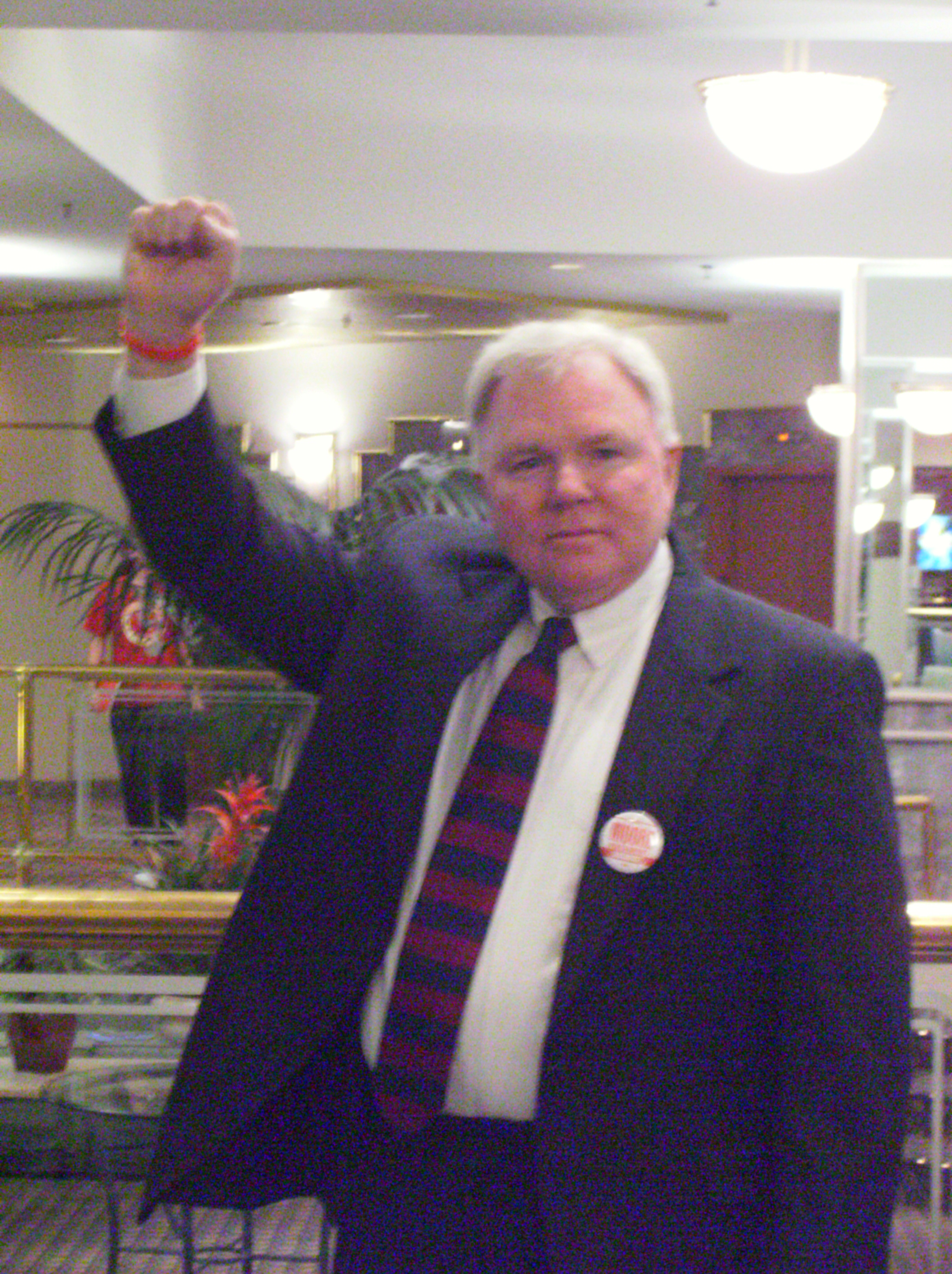
- Brian Moore in an official campaign photo after being selected as the Socialist Party USA Presidential nominee on October 20, 2007.

Personal details
- Born: Brian Patrick Moore; June 8, 1943 (age 83) Oakland, California, U.S.
- Party: Green
- Other political affiliations: Democratic; Alliance; Independent; Liberty Union; Socialist
- Education: San Luis Rey College, Arizona State University

Brian Patrick Moore (born June 8, 1943) is an American politician and founder of antiwar organization Nature Coast Coalition for Peace & Justice. A perennial candidate, he was the presidential nominee of the Socialist Party USA for the 2008 United States presidential election; he waged several campaigns for mayor and city council in Washington, D.C., and twice ran for the United States House of Representatives from Florida's 5th congressional district, winning none; he ran for the Democratic Party nomination for Governor of Florida in 2010, but lost in the primary election.

During his presidential campaign, Moore supported strengthening the working class and pledged to withdraw troops from Iraq and Afghanistan and reduce the budget for the Department of Defense by 50%.

== Background ==
Moore earned a bachelor's degree at San Luis Rey College in California, a master's degree in Public Administration from Arizona State University, and studied in a Franciscan Catholic seminary before joining the Peace Corps in 1969. As a Peace Corps volunteer and later working for a non-profit agency, Moore was involved in community development and infrastructure projects in impoverished neighborhoods of Bolivia, Panama and Peru. He has worked almost 20 years in the HMO/Managed Care industry as an Executive Director, Project Administrator, and Consultant.

Internationally, Moore has been involved in community development, reconstruction and infrastructure rehabilitation projects (housing, water, electricity and sewage) in the developing and poverty-stricken countries of Panama, Peru, and Ecuador. For more than five years, Moore designed and implemented programs for public health projects (vaccination and health education) in Latin America (Brazil, Guatemala, Colombia, Dominican Republic and Mexico) and Tanzania, Africa, in coordination with and on behalf of private corporations, religious institutions and non-governmental organizations. Moore raised $3 million for a de-worming project that successfully protected more than one million children from parasitic infections in the poverty-stricken areas of Brazil, Guatemala and the Dominican Republic.

== Politics ==
Moore was a member of the Democratic Party and worked as the 1976 New Mexico coordinator for Terry Sanford, who lost the nomination to Jimmy Carter. The experience turned Moore off the Democrats to becoming independent because "the Democrats threw over this liberal, progressive guy." He volunteered for independents John B. Anderson in 1980 presidential election and Ralph Nader in 2004 and supported Reform Party candidate Pat Buchanan in the 2000 presidential election because Buchanan "was for fair trade over free trade. He had some progressive positions that I thought would be helpful to the common man." In the 1980s, Moore was elected to three terms on the local Advisory Neighborhood Commission in Washington, D.C. Moore waged several unsuccessful bids for mayor (1986, 1990, 1994, 1998) and city council (1984, 1992) in Washington, D.C. He also twice ran for the U.S. House of Representatives from Florida's 5th congressional district in 2002 and 2004.

In 2006, running as a Green Party-endorsed independent anti-war candidate against Sen. Bill Nelson and Republican challenger Katherine Harris, Moore polled 19,695 votes. During that campaign, he called for the impeachment of President George W. Bush and Vice President Dick Cheney. Ralph Nader endorsed Moore in the race. Moore's campaign manager was Darcy Richardson.

=== 2008 presidential campaign ===
In 2007, he became a socialist and joined the Socialist Party USA as a presidential candidate for the 2008 election. Moore says being called a socialist by opponents opened him up to the movement. Moore, of Florida, and vice-presidential nominee Stewart Alexander of California, were nominated on October 20, 2007, at the Socialist Party USA's National Convention in St. Louis, Missouri, where their ticket won by four votes. Moore also was the only candidate to collect the 1,000 signatures required to participate in the Liberty Union Party's presidential primary. He was on the ballot under the Socialist Party USA in Colorado, Florida, Iowa, New Jersey, Ohio, Tennessee, and Wisconsin, and on the ballot under the Liberty Union Party in Vermont. He was also available as a write-in candidate in several other states. On election day Moore received 6,528 votes nationally. His two best state-level presidential vote showings were in Ohio and Tennessee, in which he received 2,731 votes and 1,326 votes, respectively.

On October 28, 2008, Moore appeared on the Colbert Report and dismissed accusations from John McCain that Barack Obama is a Socialist.

=== Political positions ===
Moore has been a persistent critic of U.S. military involvement in Iraq. He is an advocate for democratic public control of the economy and society, participatory democracy, universal health care, greater employment, and housing for all.

Moore wants to "get rid of the for-profit system" and calls for Wall Street to be made into a "socially owned democratic authority of economists, experts and consumers who are not part of consumer America, to oversee these banks, to form credit unions, state banks." He proposes that under his system, the best-paid would make no more than 10 times what the lowest-paid worker receives.

=== 2010 Florida gubernatorial candidate ===
Moore unsuccessfully ran for the Democratic Party nomination for the 2010 Florida gubernatorial election. Moore lost to Florida's Chief Financial Officer, Democrat Alex Sink in the primary.

He received 23.09% (199,247) of the vote while his opponent Alex Sink won with 76.91% (663,510) out of 862,757 total votes cast.

Brian Moore was endorsed by the "American Socialist Party" (not affiliated with the Socialist Party USA) for which he is a local organizer..

=== 2020 presidential campaign ===
On November 7, 2019, Moore filed to get on the ballot in New Hampshire's Democratic primary. He withdrew from the race on November 13.

=== Alliance Party ===
Moore was a speaker at the 2020 Alliance Party national convention, where he introduced the candidacy of Darcy Richardson for vice-president.

=== 2022 Election ===
Moore initially announced that he would be running for Governor as a Green. After disagreements with leaders of the Green Party of Florida, Moore qualified to run for Florida State Senate in District 11 against Blaise Ingoglia.

Party political offices
Preceded by Walt Brown	Socialist Party Presidential candidate 2008 (lost)	Succeeded by Stewart Alexander
Preceded by John Parker	Liberty Union Party Presidential candidate 2008 (lost)	Succeeded by Stewart Alexander
