= Cordaro =

Cordaro is both a surname and a given name. Notable people with the name include:

== People with the surname ==
- Alessandro Cordaro, Belgian winger
- Daniel Cordaro, American psychologist
- Frank Cordaro, American peace activist
- Martie Cordaro, president of the Omaha Storm Chasers
- Mike Cordaro, former American football player

== People with the given name ==
- Cordaro Howard, retired American football guard
- Cordaro Stewart, American rapper
