= Santa Barbara Mission-Archive Library =

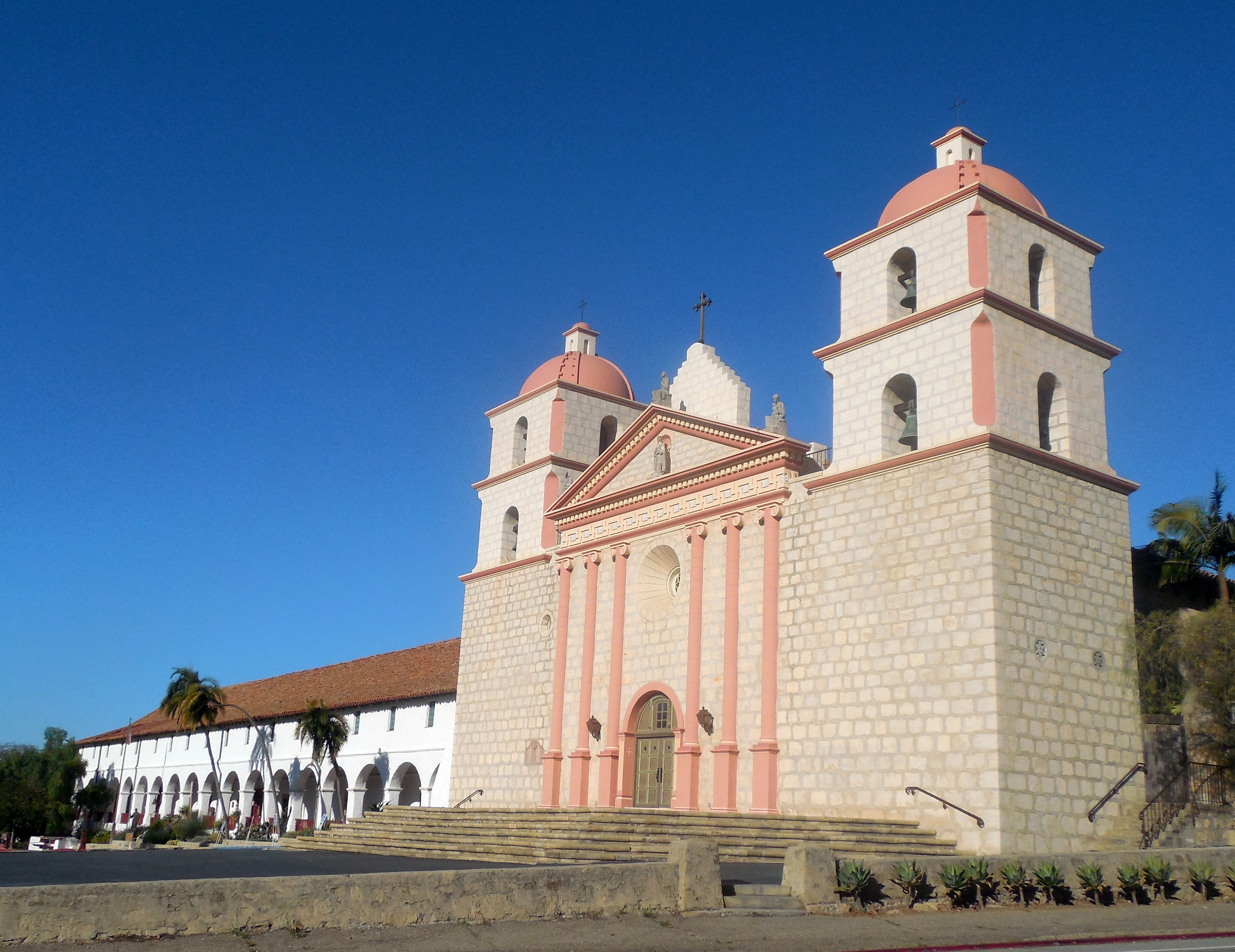
- Old Mission Santa Barbara
- 34.4385674°N 119.7135889°W
- Location: Santa Barbara, California
- Type: Independent, non-profit educational and research institution of the California mission system
- Established: 1967

Collection
- Items collected: Historical documents, artifacts, photos, and books pertaining to the Franciscan Missions of California, Arizona; and much of the western United States.

Other information
- Director: Jack Clark Robinson, O.F.M., Ph.D
- Employees: around 3 total (2016)
- Website: www.sbmal.org

The Santa Barbara Mission Archive-Library was founded in 1967 as an independent, non-profit educational and research institution. The collection of mission documents in the archive-library remain in situ from the founding of the mission system. The collections include named sections, the Junipero Serra Collection (1713-1947), the California Mission Documents (1640-1853), and the Apostolic College collection (1853-1885). The archive-library also has a large collection of early California writings, maps, and images as well as a collection of materials for the Tohono O'odham Indians of Arizona. The institution holds several thousand photo images of various types covering a broad range of subjects and dating back to the late nineteenth century. Their collections also contain nineteenth-century oil paintings of the California missions by Edwin Deakin

SBMAL is also the archival repository for registers in which the sacraments of baptism, marriage, and burial were recorded at the California missions.

== History ==
The current archive-library, associated with but not part of the Franciscan Mission Santa Barbara, is a secular institution with a friar currently as their Executive Director. The original collection and organization is from the founding of the mission system in Alta California by the Franciscan Order. Santa Barbara became the headquarters of the California mission system, and documents relating to other California missions were collected and stored in Santa Barbara. The mission system was founded during period that Spanish Empire claimed California. With Mexican independence in 1821, religious jurisdiction remained in Franciscan hands, but the Mexican government in the early 1830s secularized the missions, turning them into parish churches. The collection of books and documents held by the Franciscan totaled around 3000 documents and around 1,000 books.

The materials held by the Franciscans was increased by Fr. Zephyrin Engelhardt, who conducted research on the Franciscan missions in California. He took extensive notes in the California archive in the office of the Surveyor General in San Francisco. Those notes are invaluable, since that office was destroyed in the San Francisco earthquake of 1906.

The physical condition of the collection deteriorated, due to dampness in the storage area and mold. In order to prevent further damage, a new facility to house the collection was envisioned. Creating a non-profit corporation, separate from Mission Santa Barbara was accomplished in 1967. For a period, it was headed in succession by Franciscans Geiger, Francis Guest, and Virgilio Biasiol, who initiated steps to better preserve the collection. Following the death Biasiol, the Archive-Library hired a lay professional archivist, Lynn Bremer. The second lay professional historian and archivist is Dr. Mónica Orozco. The current director is Fr. Jack Clark Robinson, O.F.M., who holds a Ph.D. from University of California, Santa Barbara.

Primarily a research facility, the Archive-Library also hosts talks by scholars. Its collection is listed in a finding aid at the Library of Congress.

It has been featured in a segment on C-SPAN, with then SBMAL Director Orozco highlighting aspects of the collection.
