= Franciscan School of Theology =

Theological school in California, US

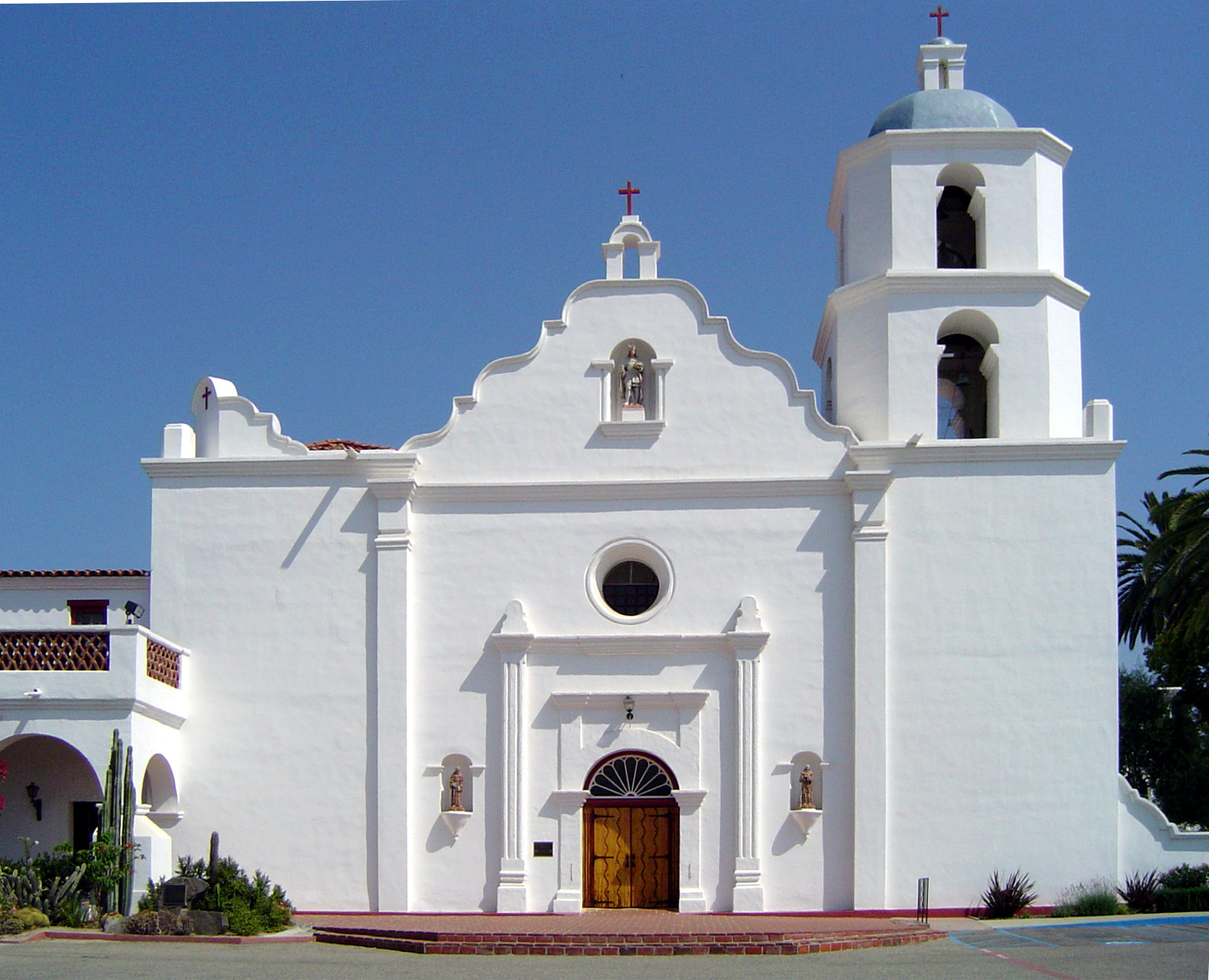
- Former name: San Luis Rey College
- Type: Private graduate theological school
- Established: 1854
- Affiliations: Catholic (Order of Friars Minor)
- President: Keith Douglass Warner OFM
- Dean: Juliet Mousseau
- Faculty: 6 full-time; 9 part-time
- Postgraduates: 64
- Location: San Diego, California, US; 32°46′16″N 117°11′15″W
- Campus: Urban
- Website: fst.edu

The Franciscan School of Theology (FST) is a Catholic graduate theological school at the University of San Diego, a private Roman Catholic research university in San Diego, California, United States. FST is owned and operated by the Province of Saint Barbara of the Order of Friars Minor. FST "is the only freestanding Franciscan graduate theological school in North America dedicated to the Franciscan intellectual tradition."

== History ==
Franciscan School of Theology traces its roots back to 1854 when an apostolic college was chartered at Mission Santa Barbara. Over time, this college was augmented by other academic programs. In 1968, the school of theology relocated from Santa Barbara to Berkeley, California, where it joined the Graduate Theological Union.

In 2012, FST announced that it was affiliating with USD and relocating to Mission San Luis Rey de Francia in Oceanside, California. Seven years later, FST and USD announced that the former was relocating to the latter, where it currently resides.

Keith Douglass Warner OFM will succeed Garrett Galvin OFM as president of FST on July 1, 2026.

== Academics ==
FST "is the only freestanding Franciscan graduate theological school in North America dedicated to the Franciscan intellectual tradition." It is accredited by the Association of Theological Schools in the United States and Canada and the WASC Senior College and University Commission.

FST trains lay men and women of the Catholic Church, Franciscan seminarians, and seminarians for the Diocese of San Diego.

The school offers several degrees:

- Master of Arts (MA) in theology
- Master of Theological Studies (MTS)
- Master of Divinity (M Div.)
- MDiv and MTS concurrent, dual-degree program
- Doctor of Education in Catholic Social Thought (with USD)

It also offers non-degree, continuing education, and personal enrichment programs.
