= William J. Waltersheid =

American Catholic bishop

His Excellency, The Most Reverend William John Waltersheid
- Auxiliary Bishop of Pittsburgh; Titular Bishop of California
- Archdiocese: Philadelphia
- Diocese: Pittsburgh
- Appointed: February 25, 2011
- Installed: April 25, 2011
- Other post: Titular Bishop of California

Orders
- Ordination: July 11, 1992 by Nicholas Dattilo
- Consecration: April 25, 2011 by David Zubik, Joseph McFadden, and Daniel Thomas

Personal details
- Born: November 18, 1956 (age 69) Ashland, Pennsylvania, US
- Education: Pottsville Hospital School of Nursing (1983); St. John Seminary College (B.A., 1987); Pontifical Gregorian University (B.A., 1991; S.T.L., 1993)
- Motto: Ecce mater tua (Behold thy mother)

Styles of William John Waltersheid
- Reference style: His Excellency; The Most Reverend
- Spoken style: Your Excellency
- Religious style: Bishop

William John Waltersheid (born November 18, 1956) is an American Catholic prelate who has served as an auxiliary bishop of the Diocese of Pittsburgh in Pennsylvania since 2011.

== Biography ==
=== Early life ===
William Waltersheid was born in Ashland, Pennsylvania on November 18, 1956 to William F. and Margaret M. (Deane) Waltersheid. He was a student in the Mount Carmel Area School System, then attended Holy Spirit High School in Mount Carmel, Pennsylvania. After his high school graduation, Waltersheid went to the Pottsville Hospital School of Nursing in Pottsville, Pennsylvania, graduating in 1983. He worked in health care for the next two years.

Having decided to become a priest, Waltersheid in 1985 enrolled in St. John Seminary College in Boston, Massachusetts. He received a Bachelor of Arts degree in philosophy and classical languages at St. John. Waltersheid then went to Rome to the seminary at the Pontifical North American College. In 1991, he received a Bachelor of Theology degree from the Pontifical Gregorian University in that city.

=== Priesthood ===
Waltersheid was ordained a priest at St. Patrick Cathedral in Harrisburg by Bishop Nicholas Dattilo for the Diocese of Harrisburg on July 11, 1992. After his ordination, Waltersheid returned to Rome for further studies. He was awarded a Licentiate in Dogmatic Theology from the Gregorian University in 1993.

After Waltersheid returned to Pennsylvania in 1994, the diocese assigned him as parochial vicar at two parishes in the diocese:

- St. Theresa in New Cumberland (1994 to 1995)
- Prince of Peace Parish in Steelton (1995 to 1999)

The Oversight Board of the Pontifical North American College appointed Watersheid as its director of pastoral formation in 1999, necessitating his relocation to Rome. He was promoted to vice rector of the college in 2000.

Waltersheid left Rome in 2003 to return to the Diocese of Harrisburg, where he was appointed pastor at St. Patrick Parish in Carlisle, Pennsylvania. In 2006, Bishop Kevin C. Rhoades moved Waltersheid from St. Patrick to serve as diocesan secretary for clergy and consecrated life in Harrisburg.

=== Auxiliary Bishop of Pittsburgh ===
Waltersheid was appointed auxiliary bishop of Pittsburgh with the titular see of California by Pope Benedict XVI on February 25, 2011. On March 11, 2011, Waltersheid was appointed as episcopal vicar for clergy and secretary for clergy. He was consecrated by Bishop David Zubik on April 25, 2011, at St. Paul's Cathedral in Pittsburgh. Waltersheid's episcopal motto is Ecce Mater Tua (Latin for Behold thy mother, from John 19:27.

== See also ==
- Catholic Church hierarchy
- Catholic Church in the United States
- Historical list of the Catholic bishops of the United States
- List of Catholic bishops of the United States
- Lists of patriarchs, archbishops, and bishops

== Episcopal succession ==
Catholic Church titles
Preceded by –	Auxiliary Bishop of Pittsburgh; 2011–present	Succeeded by incumbent
Preceded by John Ward	Titular Bishop of the Californias; 2011–present	Succeeded by incumbent
