= José González Rubio =

Californio Roman Catholic friar

The Reverend José González Rubio OFM
- Apostolic Administrator of the Californias
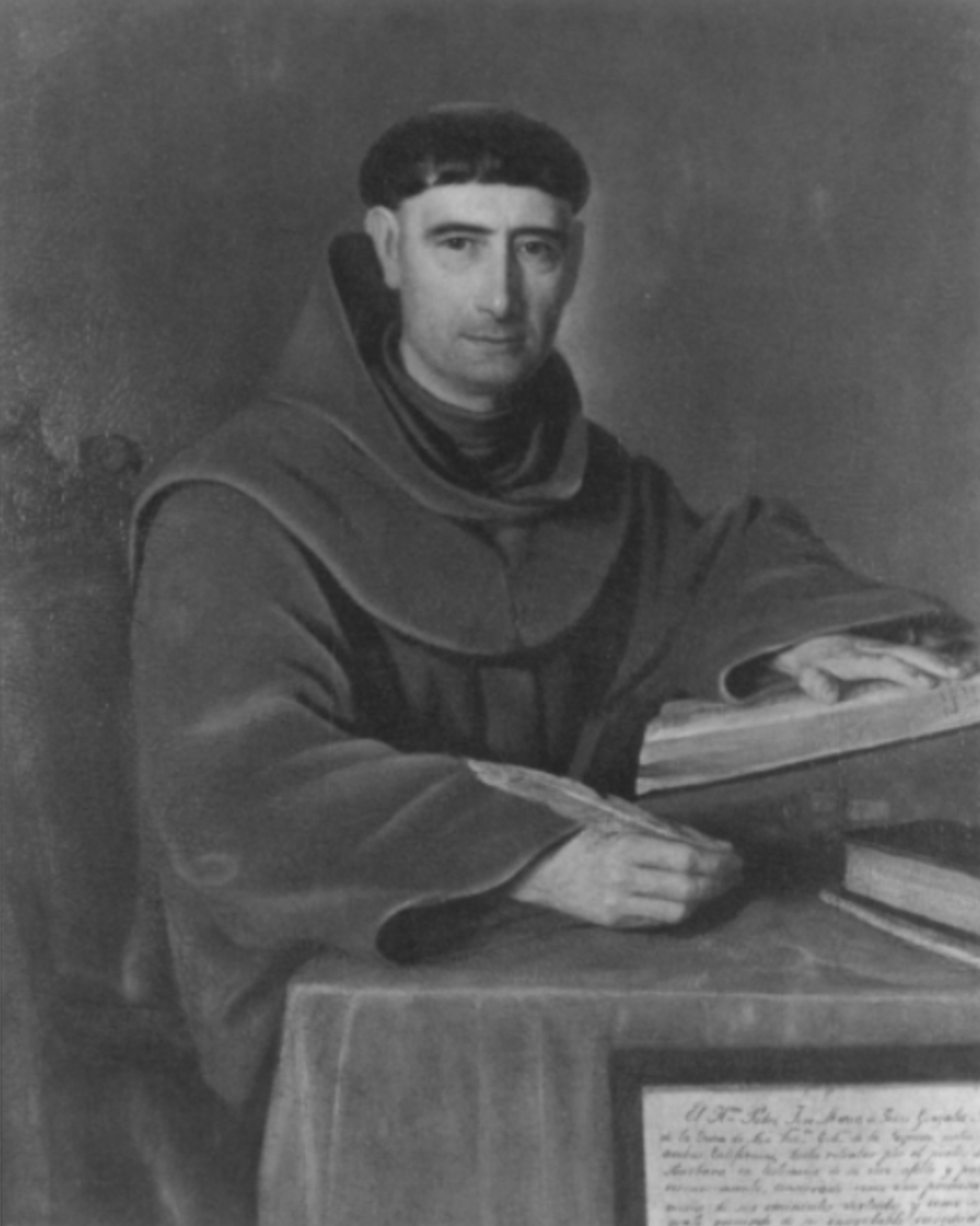
- Portrait by Leonardo Barbieri, 1850
- Church: Roman Catholic
- Diocese: Diocese of the Two Californias

Orders
- Ordination: July 20, 1820

Personal details
- Born: June 6, 1804 Guadalajara, Jalisco
- Died: November 2, 1875 (aged 71) Santa Barbara, California
- Buried: Mission Santa Barbara

José María González Rubio, O.F.M. (June 6, 1804 – November 2, 1875) was a Californio friar of the Franciscan order, known best for his long tenure as chief administrator of Mission Santa Barbara in Southern California.

== Early life ==
González Rubio was born in Guadalajara, New Spain, on June 6, 1804. His Spanish-born parents were José María González Rubio and Manuela Gutiérrez. He had at least two siblings.

Upon completing his primary education, González Rubio studied at the Seminario Conciliar of Guadalajara. He continued at the University of Guadalajara, where he graduated on July 20, 1820, with a degree in philosophy. In 1821, Mexico gained its independence from Spain. In 1824, he applied to the Colegio de Nuestra Señora de Zapopan, seeking admission to the Franciscan Order. He began his novitiate and was accepted into the Order on January 10, 1825, with the religious name "José María de Jesús" and the title of Fray (Friar).

== Missions in California ==
On February 13, 1833, González Rubio was named to replace Father Narciso Durán at the Mission San José in California, consistent with a policy of replacing Spanish-born clergy with those born in Mexico. He arrived at the Mission two months later to begin his new duties. During his tenure, the Mexican government began to implement a policy to secularize the California missions.

In 1842, González Rubio was transferred to the Mission Santa Barbara, eventually becoming its chief administrator. He served as the Apostolic administrator of the Diocese of the Two Californias after Bishop Francisco Garcia Diego y Moreno's death in 1846 until bishop Joseph Alemany's appointment as Bishop of Monterey in 1850.

González Rubio continued to serve as the administrator of Mission Santa Barbara and came into conflict with the presiding bishop of the Diocese of Monterey-Los Angeles, Bishop Thaddeus Amat, over the question of jurisdiction over the Mission. González Rubio argued that the Mission was rightfully under the Franciscan order, not the diocese. During the dispute, the United States annexed California as a result of the Mexican American War. On March 18, 1865, President Abraham Lincoln restored the California missions to the Catholic Church. The deed to Mission Santa Barbara was given to the diocese, not the Franciscans. González Rubio protested, but Bishop Amat refused to give up the deed to the Mission. However, in 1925, Bishop John J. Cantwell handed the deed over to the Franciscans at Mission Santa Barbara.

== Death ==
Having lived long enough to become the oldest survivor of the early California missionaries, he died on November 2, 1875, at Mission Santa Barbara, where he is interred.

== Sources ==
- Hispanic Catholicism in transitional California: the life of José González Rubio, O.F.M. (1804-1875), by Michael Charles Neri, published 1997 by the Academy of American Franciscan History (v.14, history monograph series).
