= Francisco García Diego y Moreno =

Spanish Catholic prelate (1785–1846)

Right Reverend Francisco García Diego y Moreno OFM
- Bishop of the Californias
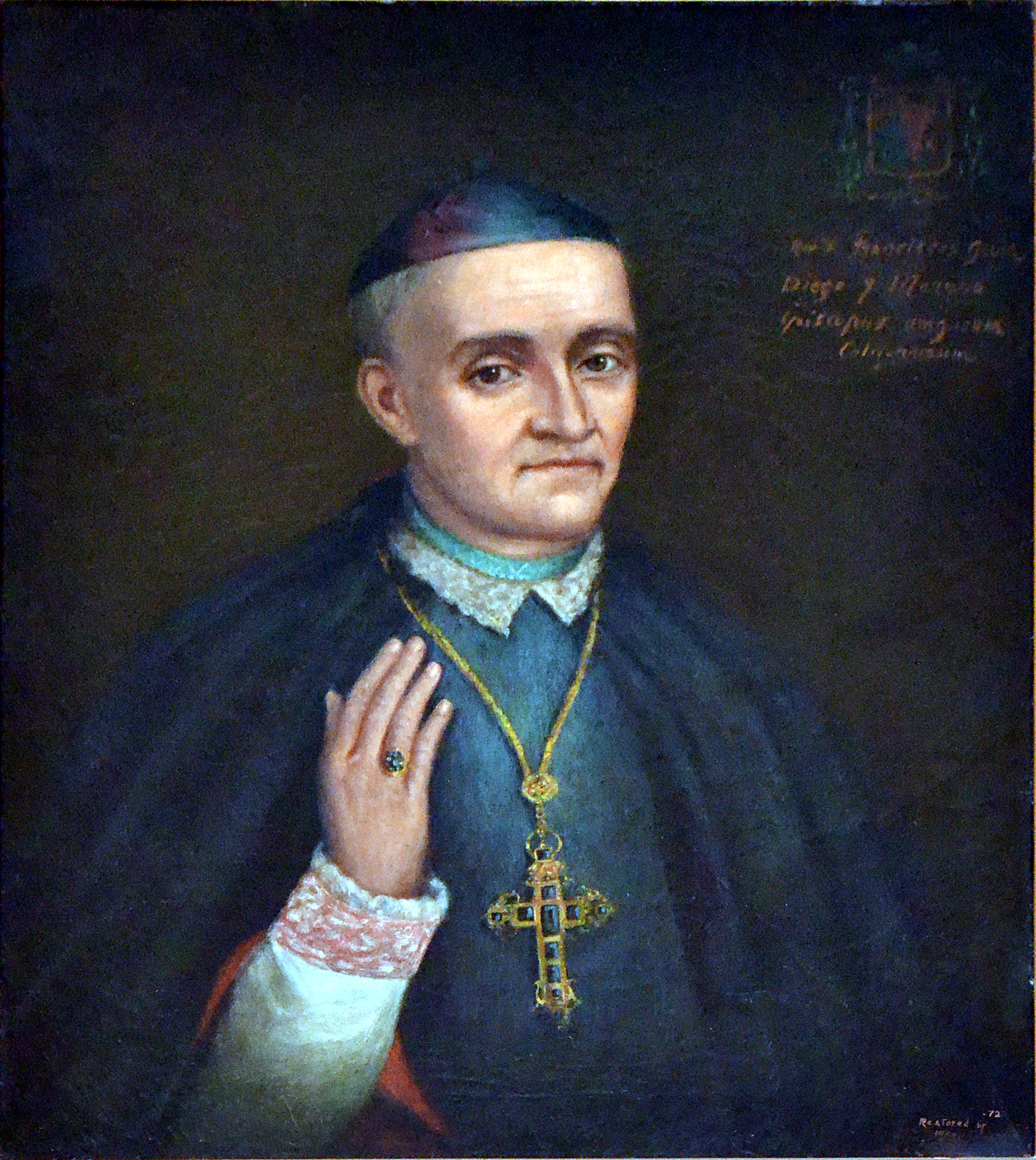
- Painting of Francisco García Diego y Moreno at the San Fernando Mission
- Church: Roman Catholic
- Diocese: Diocese of the Two Californias
- Previous post: Commissary of the Missions

Orders
- Ordination: 14 November 1808

Personal details
- Born: 17 September 1785 Lagos de Moreno, Jalisco
- Died: 30 April 1846 (aged 60) Santa Barbara, California

Styles of Francisco García Diego y Moreno
- Reference style: The Most Reverend
- Spoken style: Your Excellency
- Religious style: Monsignor

Francisco García Diego y Moreno (17 September 1785 – 30 April 1846) was a Spanish Catholic prelate who served as the first Bishop of the Californias.

== Early episcopal appointments ==
In 1801, he received the habit of Francis at the missionary College of Guadalupe de Zacatecas, made his vows the following year and was ordained a priest at Monterrey, Nuevo León, 14 Nov 1808. For the next twenty years Father Diego was mainly occupied in preaching missions, and during this period compiled a small work, Metodo de Misionar, or "Method for Giving Missions". From 1816 to 1819 he was master of novices, in 1822 he was made discretos, and in February 1832, guardian or superior of the missionary college.

== Governmental influence ==
The Mexican government, which had resolved to expel all Spanish friars from Alta California, in April 1832, requested that the college send eleven native Mexican Franciscans members to California. Father Diego went as the commissary. They reached Cabo San Lucas in September 1832, and Monterey, the capital, in February 1833. The Guadalupan friars took charge of the missions from San Antonio to Sonoma. On 6 March, Father Diego chose Mission Santa Clara for his field of labor.

== Creation of diocese ==
He remained here until the end of 1835, when he visited Mexico to induce the government to have a bishop appointed, in order to preserve the Church in California. On 19 Sep 1836, the Mexican government decided to petition the pope to create California a bishopric and congress at the same time decreed to pay the new bishop an annual salary of $6,000 until the diocese should have a sufficient income. Of the three candidates proposed by the metropolitan chapter on 22 June 1839, the Mexican government on 6 April 1840, recommended Father Francisco Garcia Diego.

On 27 April Pope Gregory XVI withdrew California from the jurisdiction of the Bishop of Sonora, and at the same time appointed Father Diego first Bishop of Upper and Lower California with the see at Mission San Diego de Alcalá.

== Consecration as first diocesan bishop ==
Diego was consecrated at the Franciscan church of Guadalupe, Zacatecas, on 4 October 1840, and on 11 December 1841, landed at San Diego. Owing to the poverty and insignificance of the place, he removed his residence to Mission Santa Barbara on 11 January 1842. When he arrived, there were only seventeen Franciscan Fathers, mostly aged and infirm, in charge of the twenty-one secularized Indian missions and six Spanish towns. The bishop began with great plans and a desire to promote the welfare of the church in his territory.

== Governmental interference ==
The Mexican government had encouraged him by giving him a fixed salary and entrusted to him the management of the Pious Fund of the Californias. But, in February 1842, President Santa Anna confiscated the Fund. The bishop received no aid and he was obliged to depend upon the contributions from the few white settlers in the territory. Many of them refused to pay the tithes which he had found it necessary to impose.

== Achievements ==
Nevertheless, Diego opened the first seminary on the Pacific coast at the former Mission Santa Inés, about fifteen miles from the ocean and forty-five miles from Santa Barbara. He also made a first visitation of all the churches in the diocese, and to some places even went a second time. Worn out by hardships and disheartened at the deplorable conditions which he could not remedy, Bishop Diego died, and was buried in the old Mission Santa Barbara. A marker at the Los Angeles Cathedral implies he is still buried at the Santa Barbara Mission.

Bishop García Diego High School in Santa Barbara is named after him.

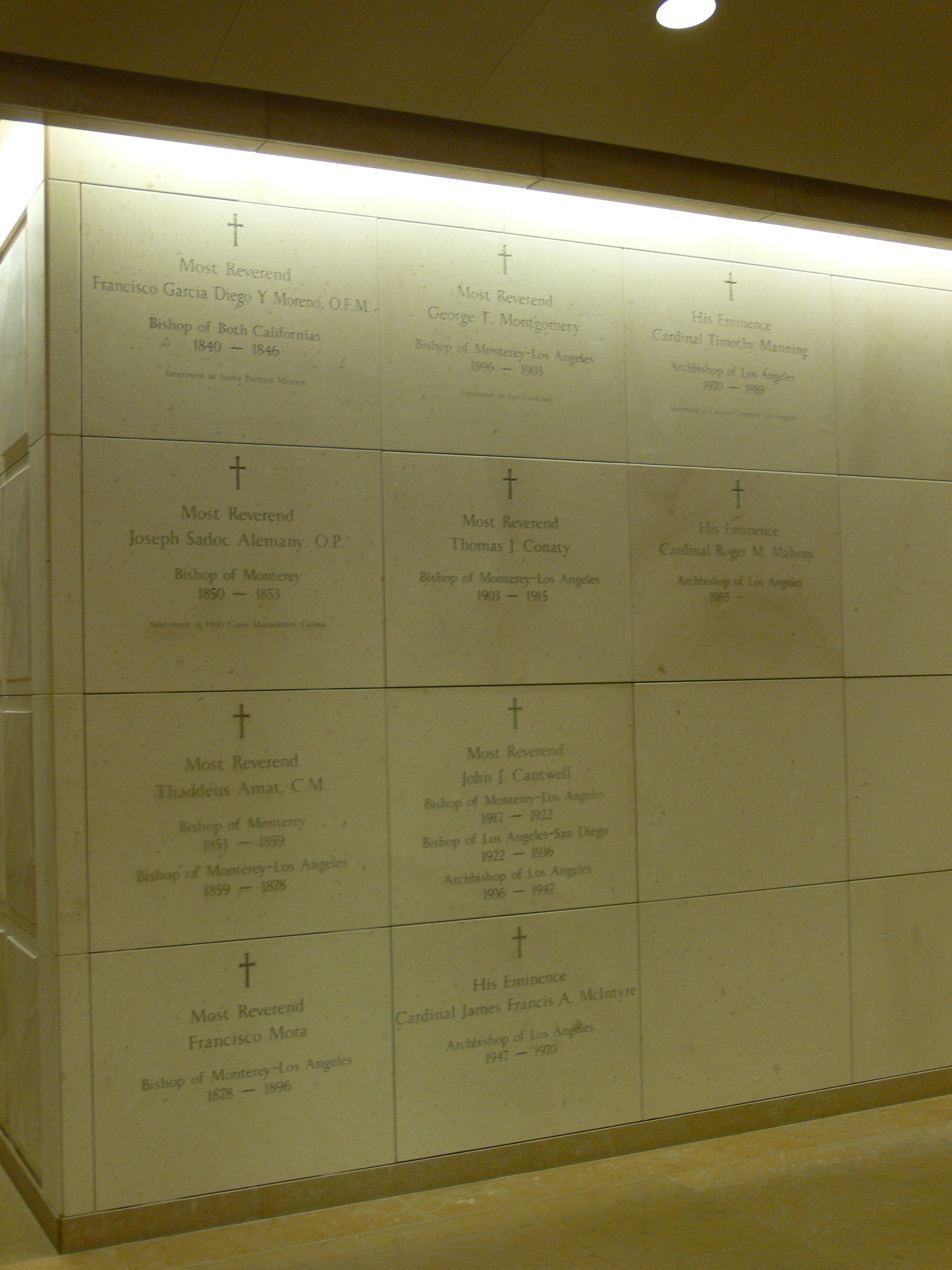
A marker at the Los Angeles Cathedral implies he is still buried at the Santa Barbara Mission.

Catholic Church titles
Preceded by Founding Bishop	Bishop of the Californias; 1840–1846	Succeeded by José Maria González Rúbio
