= Frank Cordaro =

American activist (born 1951)

- Born: 1951 (age 74–75)

Frank Cordaro (born 1951) is a peace activist and co-founder of the Des Moines, Iowa, Catholic Worker group. He frequently attends protests and gives lectures at school and community events in Nebraska and Iowa. He was a Roman Catholic priest from 1985 until leaving the priesthood in 2003 for personal reasons, including his wish to be released from the vow of celibacy. Max McElwain calls him a Christian anarchist, and Cordaro frequently participates in peace rallies involving civil disobedience. He has been sentenced to at least eight six-month terms in federal jail for trespassing onto military bases and federal buildings during demonstrations, most often at Strategic Air Command at Offutt Air Force Base near Omaha, Nebraska.

== Background ==
Cordaro grew up in Des Moines, and went to the University of Northern Iowa where he was a wrestler.

== Awards ==
He was awarded the Peace Abbey Courage of Conscience Award in November 1990.
