= San Luis Rey College =

Coordinates: 33.2329°N 117.3204°W

- Type: Private
- Active: 1950–1968
- Affiliations: Catholic, Franciscan
- Location: Oceanside, California, United States

San Luis Rey College was a Franciscan seminary in Oceanside, California, United States. It was located on the site of Mission San Luis Rey de Francia, one of the California missions founded by the Franciscans in 1798. The school had moved from Mission Santa Barbara, headquarters of the Franciscan province, in 1929. In 1950 it became a four-year accredited college. The school closed in 1968 and the seminary was relocated to Berkeley as the Franciscan School of Theology, one of the schools that is a part of the Graduate Theological Union.
