= Virgil Cordano =

George Cordano (December 3, 1919 – May 22, 2008), known as Father Virgil Cordano or Father Virgil O.F.M. was the Franciscan friar and long-time pastor of the Santa Barbara Mission.

== Early life and family ==
Father Virgil Cordano's given name was George Cordano. He was born on 3 December 1919 into a Catholic Italian immigrant family in Sacramento, California.

== Career ==
Father Cordano came to Santa Barbara, California in 1934 to study at Saint Anthony's Seminary at the Santa Barbara Mission, then the primary training ground in California for the Franciscan Order (Friars Minor, or OFM). He graduated in 1939 as class valedictorian. After completing his clerical training at the Mission Theological Seminary, he was ordinated in June 1945 by Bishop Joseph T. McGucken. Except for graduate work at The Catholic University of America, Washington, D.C., Cordano spent his entire career at the Santa Barbara Mission. He was chosen to be the official Santa Barbara greeter of Queen Elizabeth II during her 1983 visit to the town.

== Declining health and death ==
Father Cordano died at age 89 on May 22, 2008.

== Distinctions and awards ==
- Named Santa Barbara's Man of the Year in 1988
- The Virgil Cordano Chair for Catholic Studies and the Virgil Cordano, OFM, Endowment in Catholic Studies at the University of California Santa Barbara (UCSB) is named in honor of Fr. Cordano. Professor Ann Taves, PhD, currently serves as the Virgil Cordano Chair of Catholic Studies.

== Books ==
- Padre: The Spiritual Journey of Father Virgil Cordano (Capra Press, 2005)
