= Roman Catholic Diocese of California =

Former residential and current titular see of the Catholic Church

The Diocese of California, Diocese of the Californias or Diocese of Two Californias, (Latin: Dioecesis Californiensis) is a former Latin Church residential episcopal see that existed during 1840–1849, covering the Californias (including both Alta California and Baja California). After the Mexican–American War, the American portion became the Diocese of Monterey in California, while the Mexican portion was eventually reorganized into an apostolic administration, later a apostolic vicariate (it became in 1963 the Diocese of Tijuana). In 1996, the title was revived as a titular see of the Catholic Church.

== Residential see ==
Pope Gregory XVI set up the Diocese of California with the papal bull Apostolicam sollicitudinem of 27 April 1840. He assigned to the new diocese a vast territory taken from that of the Diocese of Sonora, now the Metropolitan Archdiocese of Hermosillo, in Mexico. It included Alta California (corresponding to the present-day American states of California, Nevada, Arizona, Utah, western Colorado and southwestern Wyoming) and the Baja California Territory (the modern Mexican states of Baja California and Baja California Sur). He set the episcopal residence at San Diego and made the diocese a suffragan of the Archdiocese of Mexico City.

After the Mexican–American War, Alta California became United States territory and the Holy See divided the American diocese into US and Mexican sections.

On 20 November 1849, with the episcopal residence moved to Monterey, a more central position for the new diocese, the bishopric was formally suppressed, with two successor jurisdictions:

- The U.S. section became the Diocese of Monterey.
- Baja California, the part that remained Mexican, was eventually reorganized as the Vicariate Apostolic of California Inferiore in 1874, which later became the Diocese of Tijuana.

The Residential Ordinaries were:

- Bishop Francisco José Vicente Garcia Diego y Moreno, O.F.M. (April 27, 1840 – April 30, 1846)
- Apostolic Administrator Father José Maria González Rúbio, O.F.M. (1846 – November 20, 1849), subsequently Apostolic Administrator of the Diocese of Monterey.

== Titular see ==
The diocese was nominally restored as Latin titular bishopric of California or Both Californias in English, Ambas Californias in Spanish, or Californiensis in Latin. It has had following incumbents, so far of the fitting episcopal (lowest) rank :

- John James Ward (1996–2011) as emeritate. He was previously Auxiliary Bishop of Los Angeles during 1963–1996, and Titular Bishop of Bria during 1963–1996.
- William John Waltersheid, Auxiliary Bishop of Diocese of Pittsburgh (2011–present). He had no previous prelature.

== See also ==
- Catholic Church history in the United States
- List of Catholic dioceses in the United States
- List of Catholic titular sees
- Spanish missions in California
- Spanish missions in Baja California

== Sources and external links ==
- GCatholic, with titular incumbent biographies - data for all sections
