= Harasgna, California =

Tongva populated place

Coordinates: 32.9131°N 118.5056°W

Harasgna is a former Tongva-Gabrieleño Native American settlement in Los Angeles County, California.

It was listed as one of twenty seven rancherias, as the Spanish referred to them, or villages in the records of Mission San Gabriel, along with numerous other villages, alphabetically between Hahamongna and Houtgna.

Quoting Reid, an earlier writer, Hubert Howe Bancroft records the name of San Clemente Island as Harasgna and the inhabitants as "Kinkipar." Gustav Eisen wrote in 1915, "the Indians on the island were known as 'Kinkapar' and the island itself as Harasgna."

== See also ==
- Lupukngna
- Toviscanga
- Yaanga
- Category: Tongva populated places
  - Tongva language
- California mission clash of cultures
- Ranchos in California
