= Maugna, California =

Tongva village, Los Angeles County

Maugna (or Maawnga) is a former Tongva-Gabrieleño Native American settlement, or ranchería, in Los Angeles County, California. According to Hugo Reid, it was located at Rancho Los Feliz (Rancho Felis), a vast rancho that included present day Hollywood.

Gabrielino informant Séptimo López told J.P. Harrington that Maawnga was associated with los Corralitos. López’s description places Maawnga in the vicinity of the Interstate 5/State Route 2 interchange, between the hills and the Los Angeles River. The location was the southeastern corner of the Rancho los Féliz as it was confirmed in the American period.

However, informant José de los Santos Juncos told Harrington that Maawnga was located near the Jewish Cemetery. The Hebrew Benevolent Society established the cemetery in 1855 in Cemetery Ravine, south of today’s Dodger Stadium. The Jewish cemetery was located on what was determined to be city land in the American period, but it was likely grazed as part of Rancho los Féliz in Reid’s time.

The settlement was one of twenty seven villages included in the records of Mission San Gabriel, indicating that villagers from Maugna were baptized and enslaved at the mission after its establishment in the Los Angeles Basin in 1776.

== See also ==
- Genga
- Toviscanga
- Yaanga
  - Tongva language
- California mission clash of cultures
- Ranchos in California
  - Ranchería
