= Mission San Gabriel Arcángel =

18th-century Spanish mission in California

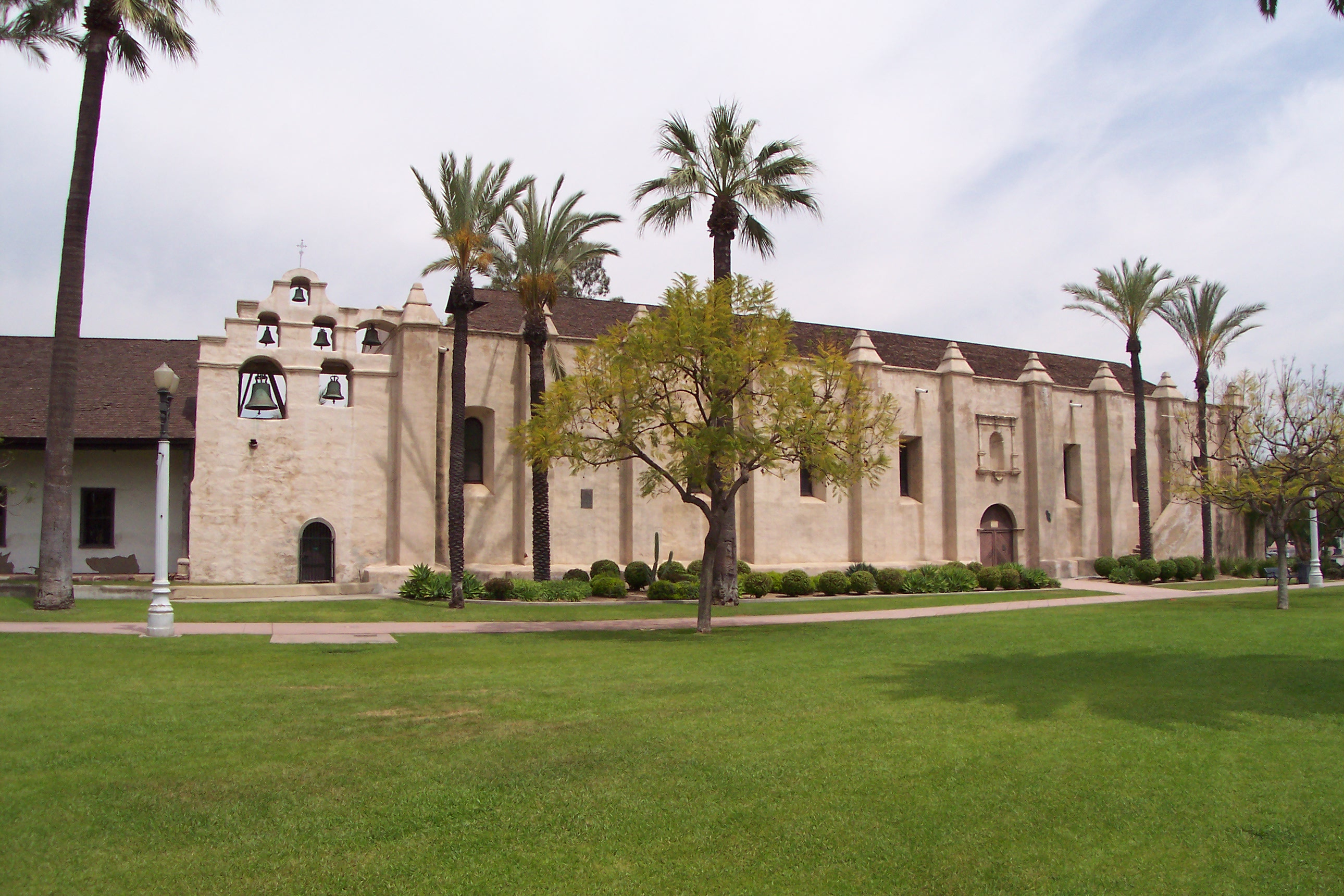
- A view of Mission San Gabriel Arcángel in April 2005. The open stairway at the far right leads to the choir loft, and to the left is the six-bell campanario ("bell wall") that was built after the original bell structure, located at the far end of the church, toppled during the 1812 San Juan Capistrano earthquake.

- Location in Los Angeles County
- Location: 428 South Mission Dr. San Gabriel, California 91776-1299
- Coordinates: 34°05′48″N 118°06′24″W
- Name as founded: La Misión del Santo Príncipe el Arcángel, San Gabriel de los Temblores
- English translation: The Mission of the Saintly Prince The Archangel, St. Gabriel of the Tremblors
- Patron: Gabriel, Holy Prince of Archangels
- Nicknames: "Pride of the Alta California Missions" "Mother of Agriculture in California"
- Founded: September 8, 1771
- Founded by: Pedro Benito Cambón and Ángel de la Somera (1st); Father Presidente Junípero Serra (2nd)
- Founding Order: Fourth
- Military district: First
- Native tribe: Tongva; Gabrieleño
- Native place name: 'Iisanchanga, Shevaanga
- Baptisms: 7,825
- Marriages: 1,916
- Burials: 5,670
- Secularized: 1834
- Returned to the Church: 1859
- Governing body: Roman Catholic Archdiocese of Los Angeles
- Current use: Chapel / Museum

U.S. National Register of Historic Places
- Designated: 1971
- Reference no.: #71000158

California Historical Landmark
- Reference no.: #158

Website
- http://www.sangabrielmission.org

Mission San Gabriel Arcángel (Spanish: Misión de San Gabriel Arcángel) is a Californian mission and historic landmark in San Gabriel, California. It was founded by the Spanish Empire on the Nativity of Mary September 8, 1771, as the fourth of what would become twenty-one Spanish missions in California. The mission was named after the Archangel Gabriel, and often referred to as the "Godmother of the Pueblo of Los Angeles."

The mission was designed by Antonio Cruzado, who gave the building its capped buttresses and the tall narrow windows, which are unique among the missions of the California chain. It was completed in 1805. A large stone cross stands in the center of the Campo Santo (cemetery), first consecrated in 1778 and then again on January 29, 1939. It serves as the final resting place for some 6,000 neophytes.

According to Spanish legend, the founding expedition was confronted by a large group of native Tongva peoples whose intention was to drive the strangers away. One of the priests laid a painting of Our Lady of Sorrows on the ground for all to see, whereupon the natives, designated by the settlers as the Gabrieleños, immediately made peace with the missionaries, as they were so moved by the painting's beauty. Today, the 300-year-old image hangs in front of and slightly to the left of the old high altar and reredos in the Mission's sanctuary. Resistance to the mission by the Tongva was recorded and how much the neophytes embraced Catholicism remains a subject of debate among scholars.

== History ==
In August 1771, the Portolà expedition, which consisted of "ten Spanish soldiers and two Franciscan priests, encountered armed Tongva Indians on the banks of the Santa Ana River." One month later, Mission San Gabriel was founded on September 8, 1771, by Fray Ángel Fernández de la Somera and Fray Pedro Benito Cambón. The planned site for the Mission was along the banks of the Río de los Temblores (the River of the Earthquakes—the Santa Ana River). The priests chose an alternate site on a fertile plain located directly alongside the Río Hondo in the Whittier Narrows. The site of the Misión Vieja (or "Old Mission") is located near the intersection of San Gabriel Boulevard and Lincoln Avenue.

The mission was built and run using what has been described as slave labor from nearby Tongva villages, such as Yaanga and was built on the site of the village of Toviscanga. When the nearby Pueblo de los Ángeles was built in 1781, the mission competed with the emerging pueblo for control of Indigenous labor.

The expedition of Juan Bautista de Anza visited the mission in January and February 1776, having previous been there in 1774. In 1776, a flash flood destroyed much of the crops and ruined the original Mission complex, which was subsequently relocated five miles closer to the mountains in present-day San Gabriel (the Tongva settlement of Toviscanga or 'Iisanchanga). The Tongva village of Shevaanga was also located "close to the second location of Mission San Gabriel" after the original site was abandoned due to the flooding.

On December 8, 1812, the Feast of the Conception of the Virgin Mary, a series of massive earthquakes shook Southern California. The 1812 San Juan Capistrano earthquake caused the three-bell campanario adjacent to the chapel's east façade, to collapse. A larger, six-bell structure was subsequently constructed at the far end of the Capilla. While no pictorial record exists to document what the original structure looked like, architectural historian Rexford Newcomb deduced the design and published a depiction in his 1916 work The Franciscan Mission Architecture of Alta (upper) California.

Over 25,000 baptisms were conducted at San Gabriel between 1771 and 1834, making it the most prolific in the chain of missions. Tongva people from nearby settlements like Akuranga village were affected by the practices of Franciscan missionaries, who attempted to "eradicate what they perceived as ills within Tongva society" through "religious indoctrination, labor, restructuring of gender structures, and violence," which took place at and around the Mission. A missionary during this period reported that three out of four children died at Mission San Gabriel before reaching the age of 2. Nearly 6,000 Tongva lie buried in the grounds of the San Gabriel Mission.

There were reports throughout this period of Indigenous peoples fleeing the conditions at the Mission. For example, in 1808, the missionaries sent Spanish soldier José Palomares after some neophytes who had fled the mission. Escapees traveled as far as the Serrano village of Wá’peat to escape the Mission. Palomares observed the escapees at the village and attempted to negotiate with the chief of the village for their return. However, the chief refused.

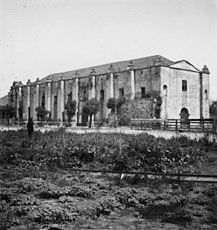
Mission San Gabriel Arcángel c. 1900. The trail in the foreground is part of the original El Camino Real.

Although San Gabriel once furnished food and supplies to settlements and other missions throughout California, a majority of the Mission structures fell into ruins after it was secularized in November 1834. During part of the 1850s, squatters set upon the mission, converting part of it into a saloon which had both felons and a justice of the peace as customers; it was opened by former San Diego Mayor Joshua Bean.

The Mission's chapel functioned as a parish church for the City of San Gabriel from 1862 until 1908, when the Claretian Missionaries came to San Gabriel and began the job of rebuilding and restoring the Mission. In 1874, tracks were laid for Southern Pacific Railroad near the mission. In 2012, artifacts from the mission era were found when the tracks were lowered into a trench known as the Alameda Corridor-East. On October 1, 1987, the Whittier Narrows earthquake damaged the property. A significant portion of the original complex has since been restored.

Fire completely destroyed the roof of the original church sanctuary on July 11, 2020. Prior to the fire, the mission was undergoing renovation, saving some paintings and artifacts. An investigation into the origin of the fire was opened. On May 5, 2021, John David Corey, age 57, was charged with felony counts of arson and burglary for setting the fire. An invitation-only Mass was celebrated in September 2022 with hope of permanently opening the mission by early December. The mission officially reopened in July 2023.

== Mission industries ==
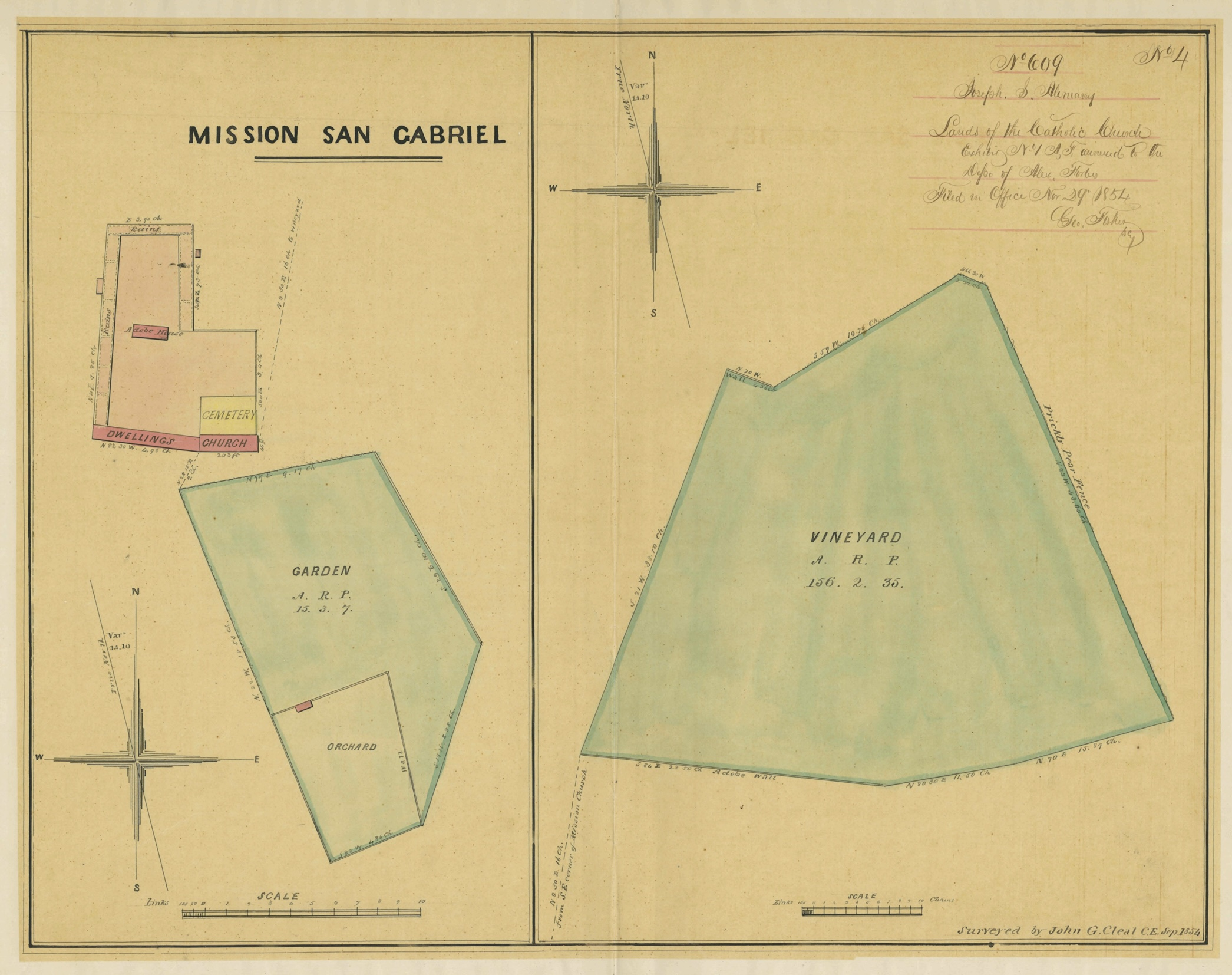
Land claims of the Catholic Church at Mission San Gabriel in 1854; the surveyor's map describes the church, cemetery, ruins, adobe house, dwellings, orchard, garden, and a vineyard bounded by an adobe wall and a prickly pear fence

The goal of the missions was to become self-sufficient in relatively short order. Farming was the most important industry of any mission. Prior to the missions, the Native Americans had developed a complex, self-sufficient culture. The mission priests established what they thought of as a manual training school: to teach the Indians their style of agriculture, the mechanical arts, and the raising and care of livestock. The missions, utilizing the labor of the neophytes, produced everything they used and consumed. After 1811, the mission Indians could be said to sustain the entire military and civil government of California.

Ranchos (not to be confused with secular government land-grant ranchos) were established in a wide area for raising cattle, sheep and other livestock. These included; San Pasqual, Santa Anita, Azusa, San Francisquito, Cucumonga, San Antonio, San Bernardino, San Gorgonio, Yucaipa, Jurupa, Guapa, Rincon, Chino, San Jose, Ybarras, Puente, Mission Vieja, Serranos, Rosa de Castilla, Coyotes, Jabonaria, Las Bolsas, Alamitos, and Cerritos. When Rancho San Gorgonio was established in 1824, in what today is known as the San Gorgonio Pass, it became the most distant rancho operated by the San Gabriel Mission.

Many of the Native Americans lived in communities called rancherías. "The names of the rancherías associated with San Gabriel Mission were: Acuragna, Alyeupkigna, Awigna, Azucsagna, Cahuenga, Chokishgna, Chowigna, Cucomogna, Hahamogna, Harasgna, Houtgna, Hutucgna, Isanthcogna, Maugna, Nacaugna, Pascegna, Pasinogna, Pimocagna, Pubugna, Sibagna, Sisitcanogna, Sonagna, Suangna, Tibahagna, Toviscanga, Toybipet, Yangna."

To efficiently manage its extensive lands, Mission San Gabriel established several outlying sub-missions, known as asistencias. Several of these became or were included in land grants following the Mexican secularization of the missions in the 1830s, including:

- Rancho Santa Ana del Chino
- Rancho La Puente
- San Bernardino de Sena Estancia
- Rancho Santa Anita

In 1816, the Mission built a grist mill on a nearby creek. El Molino Viejo still stands, now preserved as a museum and historic landmark. Other mission industries included cowhide tanning/exporting and tallow-rendering (for making soap and for export), lime kilns, tile making, cloth weaving for blankets and clothing, and adobe bricks.

== Mission bells ==
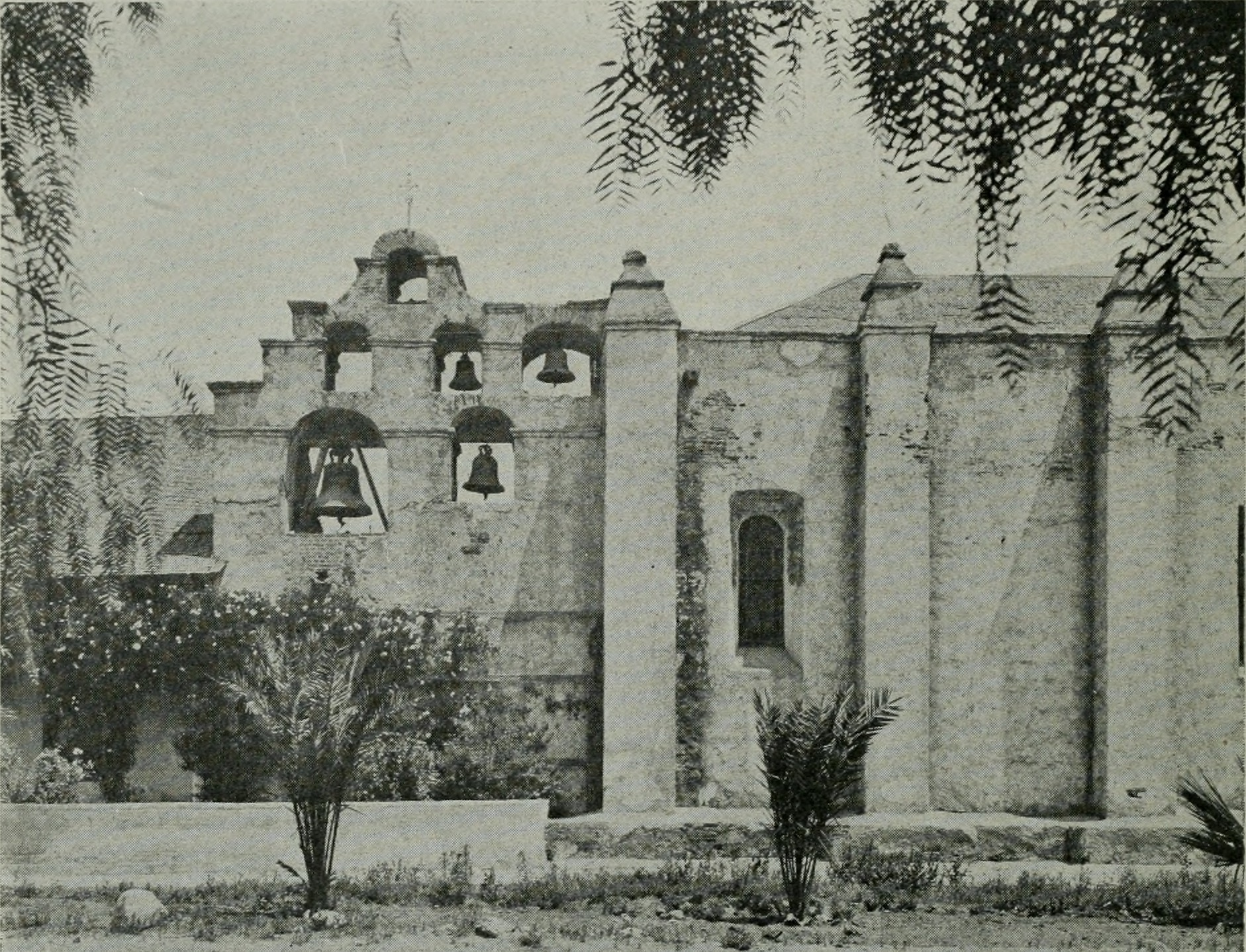
The belfry of Mission San Gabriel, 1905

Bells were important to daily life at any mission. They were rung to mark mealtimes, to call the Mission residents to work and to religious services, to mark births and funerals, to signal the approach of a ship or a returning missionary, and at other times; novices were instructed in the intricate rituals associated with the ringing of the mission bells. The mission bells were also used to tell time.

The actor Gil Frye portrayed Father Miguel Sánchez in a 1953 episode, "The Bell of San Gabriel," of the syndicated television anthology series Death Valley Days, hosted by Stanley Andrews. As a child portrayed in the segment by Peter J. Votrian, Miguel provides funds acquired from a wealthy nobleman to sweeten the tone of the bell at Mission San Gabriel Arcángel. Years later, the ringing of the bell saves his life when he is a young monk stranded in the desert in the Death Valley country.

== Burials ==
The Mission San Gabriel Arcángel Cemetery is the oldest and first Catholic cemetery in the state of California. A large stone cross stands in the center of the Campo Santo (cemetery), first consecrated in 1778 and then again on January 29, 1939, by the Los Angeles Archbishop John Cantwell. It serves as the final resting place for some 6,000 "neophytes;" a small stone marker denotes the gravesite of José de los Santos, the last American Indian to be buried on the grounds, at the age of 101 in February 1921. It is the oldest and first cemetery in the state of California.

Also interred at the Mission are the bodies of numerous Franciscan priests who died during their time of service, as well as the remains of Reverend Raymond Catalan, C.M.F., who undertook the restoration of the Mission's gardens. Entombed at the foot of the altar are the remains of eight Franciscan priests (listed in order of interment): Miguel Sánchez, Antonio Cruzado, Francisco Dumetz, Ramón Ulibarri, Joaquín P. Núñez, Gerónimo Boscana, José Bernardo Sánchez, and Blas Ordaz. Buried among the priests is centenarian Eulalia Pérez de Guillén Mariné, the "keeper of the keys" under Spanish rule; her grave is marked by a bench dedicated in her memory, and Victoria Reid, a woman from Comicranga, who was taken to the mission at a young age and became a respected figure in Mexican California.

The Tongva people have their own ceremony and traditions after death. A 1724 engraving depicts Native Americans (most likely Tongva) carrying a dead body over a smoky fire.

== Exhibits ==
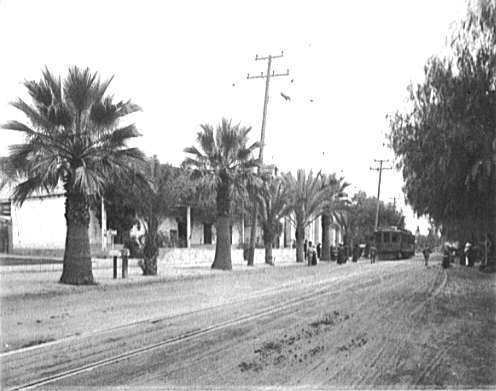
A streetcar of the Pacific Electric Railway makes a stop at Mission San Gabriel Arcángel c. 1905.

Visitors can tour the church, museum and grounds. The adobe museum building was built in 1812 and was originally used for sleeping quarters and book storage. Exhibits include mission relics, books and religious artifacts. The grounds feature operations from the original mission complex, including indoor and outdoor kitchens, winery, water cisterns, soap and candle vats, tanning vats for preparing cattle hides, and a cemetery. There is also a gift shop.

== Matrimonial Investigation Records ==
As part of the William McPherson Collection in the Special Collections at the Claremont Colleges' Honnold/Mudd Library, the San Gabriel Mission are a valuable resource for research on the pre-statehood activities of the Mission. William McPherson was a rancher, scholar, and collector from Orange County, California, who donated his extensive collection of mission documents, primarily from the Mission San Gabriel Arcángel, to Special Collections in 1964.

The matrimonial records span 1788 to 1861 and are notarized interviews with couples wanting to marry in the Roman Catholic Church, performed to establish the couples' freedom to marry. The collection includes 165 investigations, with 173 men and 170 women. Because the donated records are fragile, they are no longer available to be photocopied. The California Digital Library has an online guide available to search the collection.

== See also ==
- Spanish missions in California
- List of Spanish missions in California
- Mission San Francisco Solano (California)
- Nuestra Señora Reina de los Ángeles Asistencia
- El Molino Viejo
- San Bernardino Asistencia
- USNS Mission San Gabriel (AO-124) – a Mission Buenaventura-class fleet oiler built during World War II
- Eulalia Pérez de Guillén Mariné
- Hugo Reid
- San Gabriel Mission High School
- Henninger Flats
- Casa de San Pedro – formerly owned by the mission
