= San Gabriel, California =

City in California, United States

- City
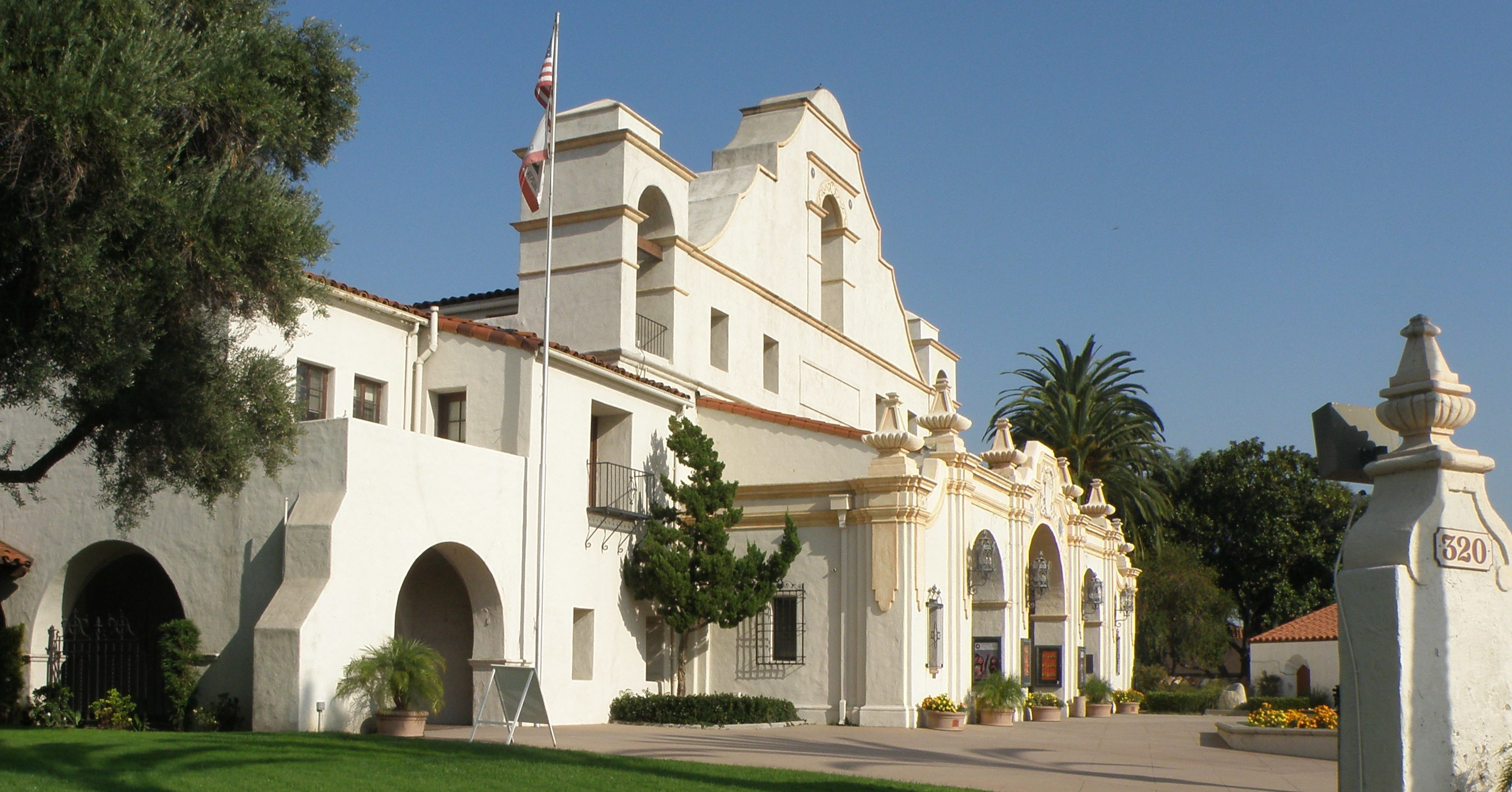
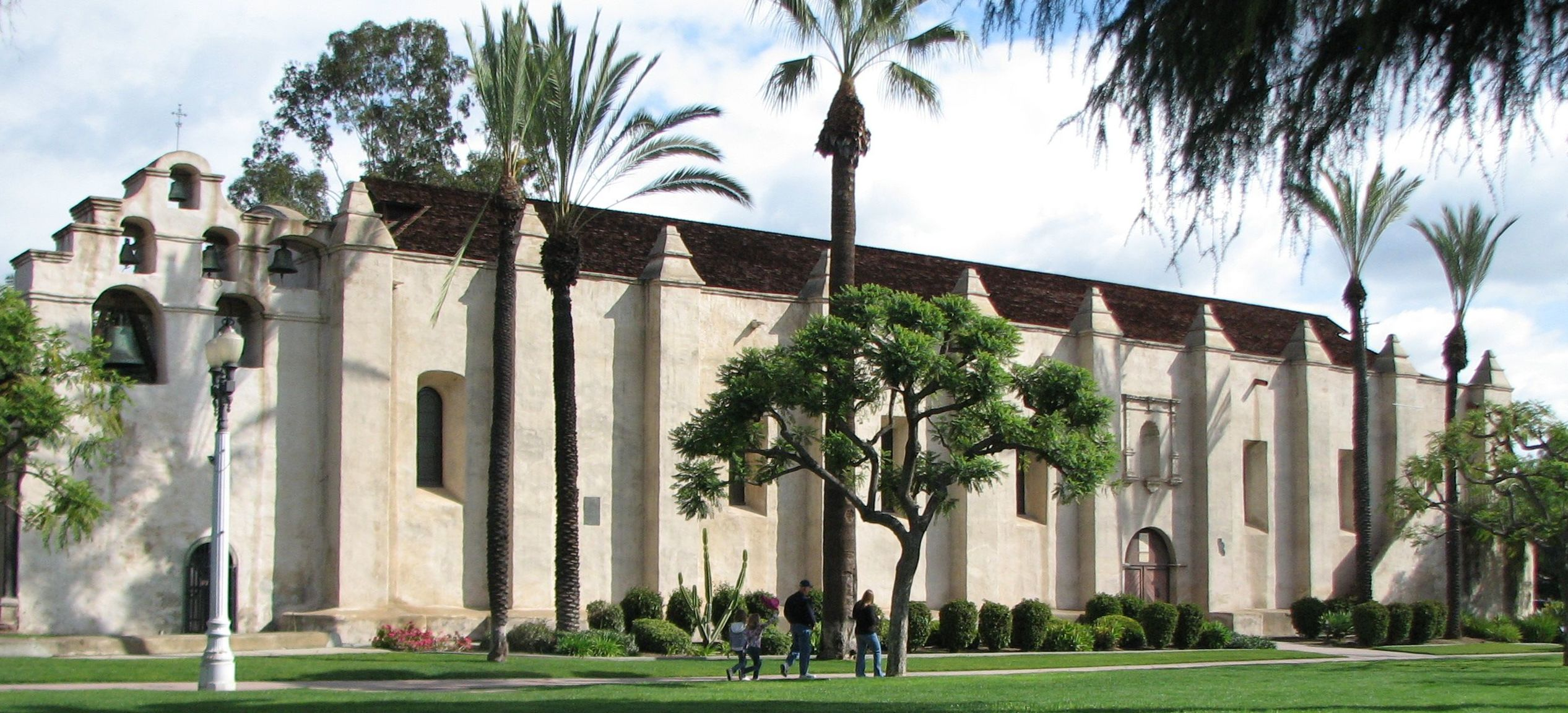
- Top: San Gabriel Mission Playhouse; Bottom: Mission San Gabriel Arcángel

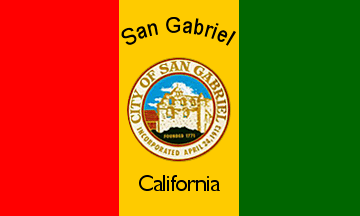
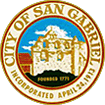
- Flag Seal
- Motto: "City With A Mission"
- Interactive map of San Gabriel, California
- Location of San Gabriel in Los Angeles County, California Location of San Gabriel in California Location of San Gabriel in the USA
- Coordinates: 34°6′10.14″N 118°5′58.89″W
- Country: United States
- State: California
- County: Los Angeles
- Incorporated: April 24, 1913
- Named for: Archangel Gabriel

Government
  - Mayor: Denise Menchaca
  - Vice Mayor: Eric Chan
  - City Council: Tony Ding; Jorge Herrera Ávila; John Wu
  - City Manager: Mark Lazzaretto

Area
  - Total: 4.15 sq mi (10.74 km^{2})
  - Land: 4.14 sq mi (10.73 km^{2})
  - Water: 0 sq mi (0.00 km^{2}) 0.02%
- Elevation: 420 ft (128 m)

Population (2020)
  - Total: 39,568
  - Density: 9,548/sq mi (3,686.6/km^{2})
- Time zone: UTC-8 (Pacific Time Zone)
  - Summer (DST): UTC-7 (PDT)
- ZIP codes: 91775, 91776, 91778
- Area code: 626
- FIPS code: 06-67042
- GNIS feature IDs: 1656614, 2411787
- Website: www.sangabrielcity.com

San Gabriel (Spanish for "Saint Gabriel") is a city located in the San Gabriel Valley of Los Angeles County, California, United States. At the 2020 census, the population was 39,568.

San Gabriel was founded by the Spanish in 1771, when Mission San Gabriel Arcángel was established by Saint Junípero Serra. Through the Spanish and Mexican periods, San Gabriel played an important role in the development of Los Angeles and Californio society. Owing to the prominence of Mission San Gabriel in the region's history, it is often called the "birthplace of the Los Angeles region".

== History ==
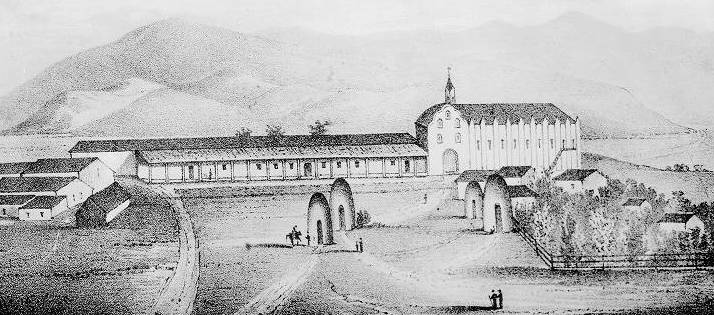
San Gabriel was established by the Spanish in 1771, when Junípero Serra founded Mission San Gabriel Arcángel.

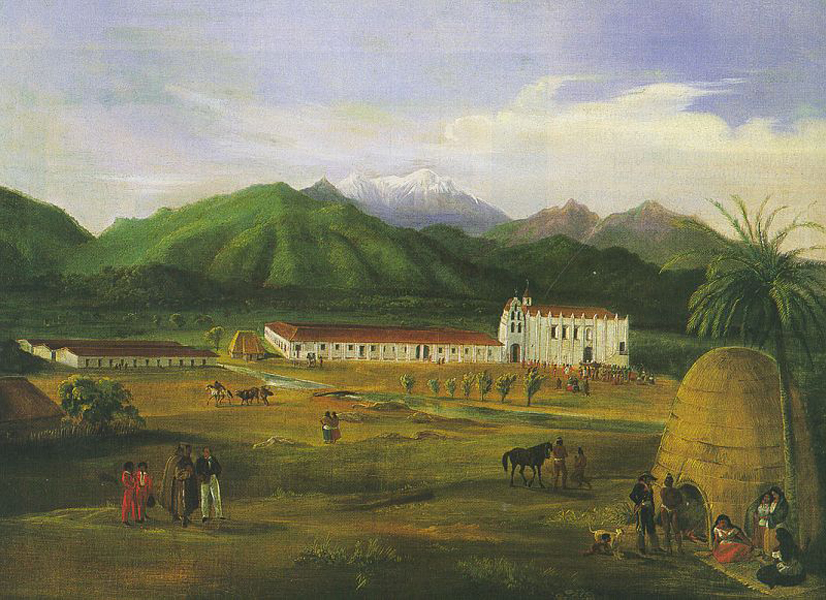
Mission San Gabriel Arcángel in 1832, painted by Ferdinand Deppe

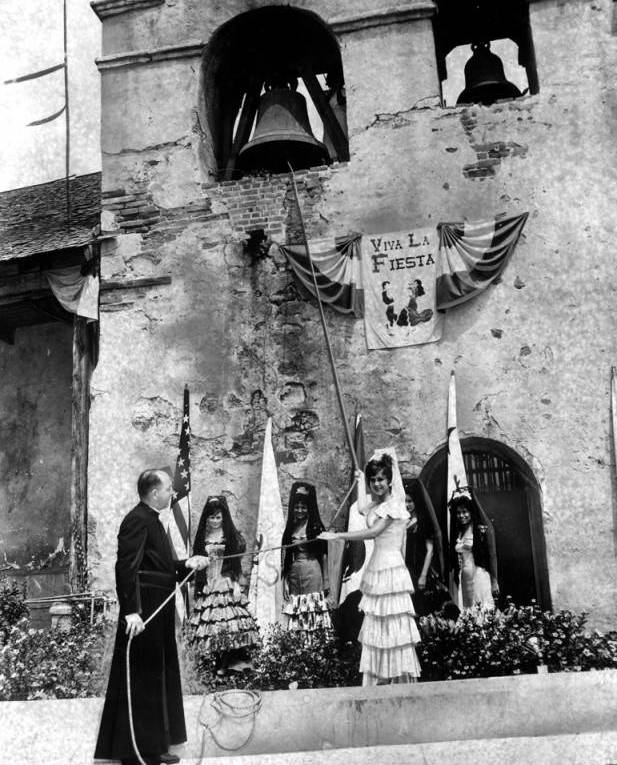
San Gabriel Mission Fiesta, 1962

=== Tongva ===
Prior to the arrival of the Spanish to Alta California, the area that is San Gabriel were inhabited by the Tongva, whom the Spanish called the Gabrieleño. The Tongva village of Shevaanga was located at the original site of Mission San Gabriel, before being moved to the site of another village, Toviscanga, in 1776 after being destroyed by a flood. These villages were part of an extensive trade network and were interconnected by a series of trails.

=== Spanish period ===
Mission San Gabriel Arcángel, founded by Father Junípero Serra in 1771, is the fourth of twenty-one California Missions, and is known as the "Pride of the California Missions." Dissidence and rebellions against the mission by the Tongva, who were forced to labor at the mission, were common. After the Spanish missionaries banned converts to Christianity from dancing and participating in ceremony, a major rebellion of eight villages was staged against the mission in 1785 led by Toypurina and Nicolás Josè.

=== Mexican period ===
The Mission San Gabriel Arcángel served a pivotal role in the Californio society, with many of the area's first Mexican settlers being baptized at the mission, including future governor Pio Pico, who was born in 1801 at the mission and baptized there the same year. He was appointed as California's governor twice, serving briefly in 1832 and again from 1845 through the Mexican–American War. Later in life, he was elected as a Los Angeles City councilman. The city of Pico Rivera was named to honor him as the last governor of California to be born in Mexico.

=== American period ===
In 1853, a company of Army Engineers, which included the geologist William P. Blake, passed by the mission in search of the best route for an intercontinental railroad. Blake observed that the once great vineyards had fallen into wild disarray. Fences were in disrepair and animals roamed freely through the property. But the mission bells were ringing and the church was still in use. Blake predicted, "I believe that when the adaptation of that portion of California to the culture of the grape and the manufacture of wine becomes known and appreciated, the state will become celebrated not only for its gold and grain, but (also) for its fruits and wines."

In the first United States census made in California in 1860, 586 people lived in the San Gabriel township, an area encompassing the mission lands and several adjacent ranchos stretching north to what is now Pasadena. By 1870, the population had shrunk to 436.

San Gabriel incorporated as a city April 24, 1913, with a population of 1,500.

== Geography ==
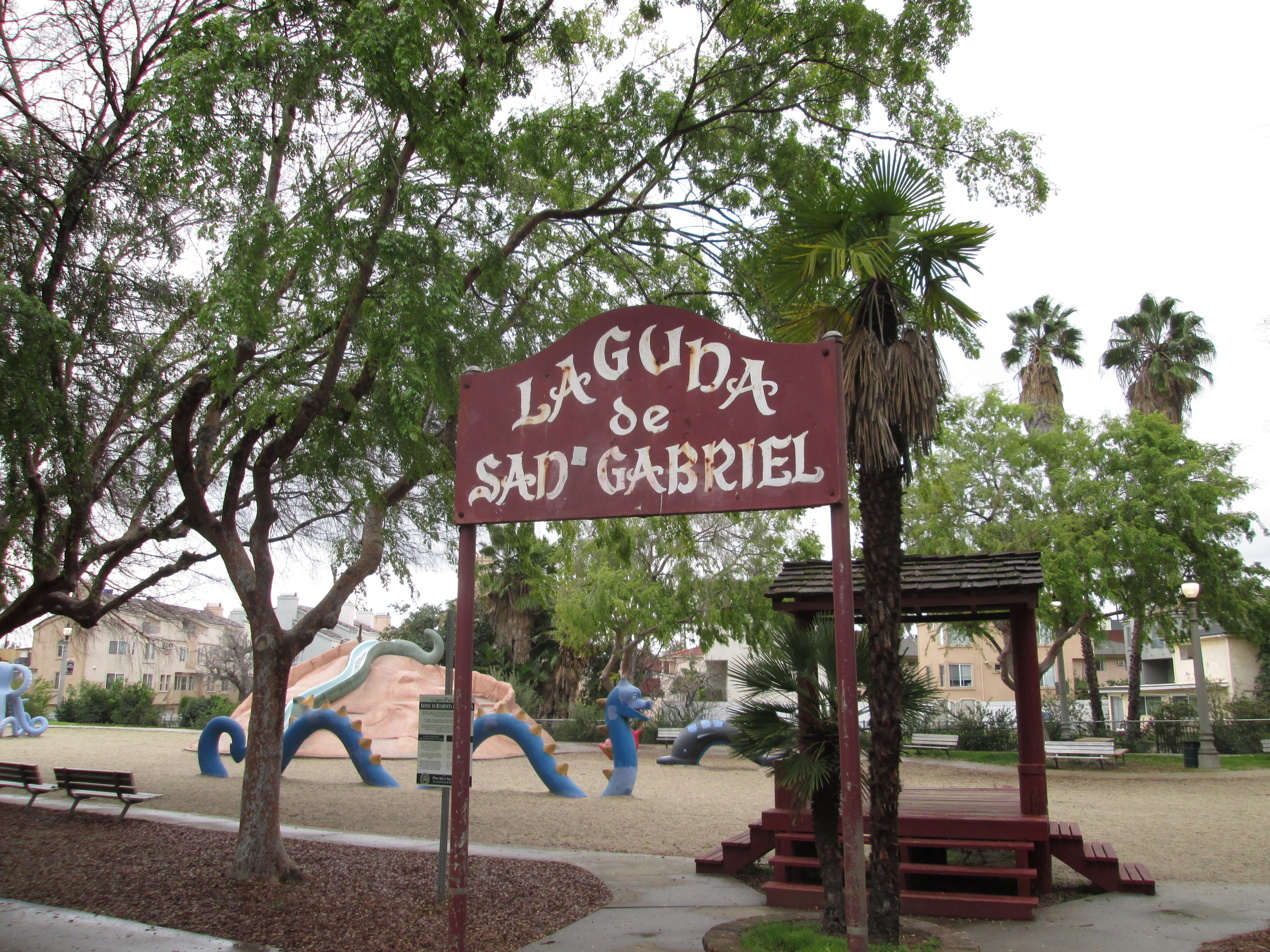
Laguna de San Gabriel, designed by Benjamín Domínguez, at Lugo Park

According to the United States Census Bureau, the city has a total area of 4.1 square miles (11 km^{2}), virtually all land.

The city is located in the San Gabriel Valley and is bordered on the north by San Marino, on the east by Temple City and Rosemead, to the south by Rosemead and to the west by Alhambra.

=== Parks ===
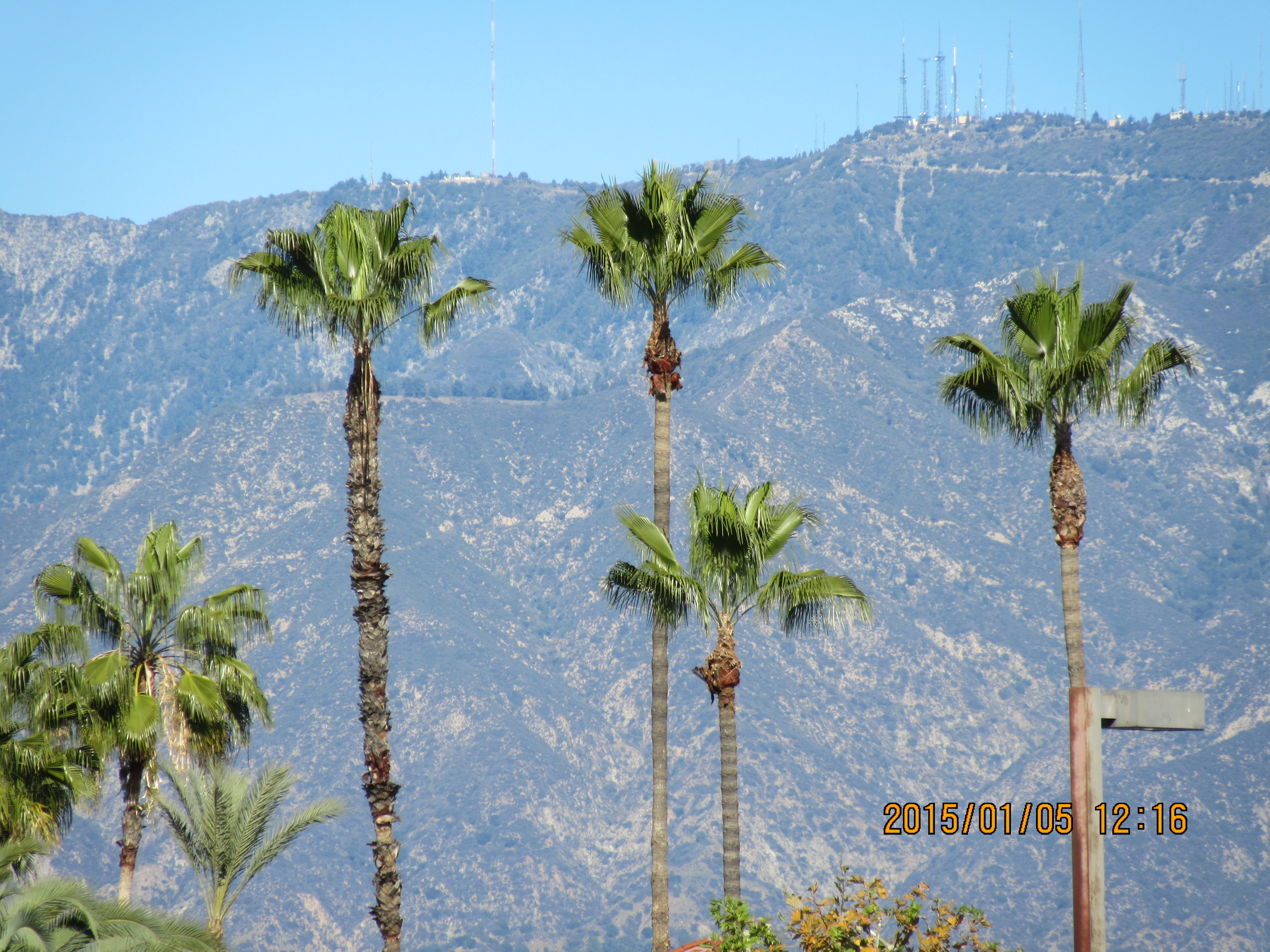
View of the San Gabriel Mountains from the city of San Gabriel

The Parks and Recreation Department offers an after school sports program and a summer playground program for San Gabriel youth. Along with these programs, the department provides a variety of trips and special events throughout the year for youth of all ages.

Parks include:

- Adult Recreation Center and Senior Center, 324 South Mission Drive
- Bovard-Wilson-Hayes House and Jail
- Grapevine Park and Arbor, 324 South Mission Drive
- Smith Park and Pool, 232 West Broadway,
- Vincent Lugo Park, Corner of Wells and Ramona Streets

=== Climate ===
According to the Köppen Climate Classification system, San Gabriel has a hot-summer Mediterranean climate, abbreviated "Csa" on climate maps. Summers are hot and very dry, and winters are mild.

Climate data for San Gabriel, California, 1991–2020 normals, extremes 1939–2015
Month	Jan	Feb	Mar	Apr	May	Jun	Jul	Aug	Sep	Oct	Nov	Dec	Year
Record high °F (°C)	94 (34)	94 (34)	101 (38)	106 (41)	106 (41)	111 (44)	108 (42)	112 (44)	112 (44)	108 (42)	101 (38)	96 (36)	112 (44)
Mean maximum °F (°C)	84.8 (29.3)	85.6 (29.8)	87.4 (30.8)	93.2 (34.0)	92.5 (33.6)	95.2 (35.1)	98.7 (37.1)	100.7 (38.2)	102.5 (39.2)	98.0 (36.7)	90.1 (32.3)	82.9 (28.3)	106.2 (41.2)
Mean daily maximum °F (°C)	68.6 (20.3)	68.2 (20.1)	70.9 (21.6)	73.8 (23.2)	75.6 (24.2)	80.8 (27.1)	85.5 (29.7)	87.6 (30.9)	86.7 (30.4)	80.7 (27.1)	74.0 (23.3)	67.8 (19.9)	76.7 (24.8)
Daily mean °F (°C)	57.4 (14.1)	57.7 (14.3)	60.7 (15.9)	63.2 (17.3)	66.6 (19.2)	71.2 (21.8)	75.4 (24.1)	76.6 (24.8)	75.1 (23.9)	69.0 (20.6)	62.3 (16.8)	56.6 (13.7)	66.0 (18.9)
Mean daily minimum °F (°C)	46.1 (7.8)	47.1 (8.4)	50.5 (10.3)	52.7 (11.5)	57.6 (14.2)	61.5 (16.4)	65.2 (18.4)	65.5 (18.6)	63.6 (17.6)	57.4 (14.1)	50.6 (10.3)	45.3 (7.4)	55.3 (12.9)
Mean minimum °F (°C)	33.9 (1.1)	35.7 (2.1)	38.5 (3.6)	41.8 (5.4)	48.1 (8.9)	52.8 (11.6)	57.1 (13.9)	56.1 (13.4)	54.2 (12.3)	47.0 (8.3)	38.6 (3.7)	33.3 (0.7)	31.8 (−0.1)
Record low °F (°C)	22 (−6)	25 (−4)	31 (−1)	34 (1)	38 (3)	43 (6)	46 (8)	47 (8)	42 (6)	33 (1)	30 (−1)	24 (−4)	22 (−6)
Average precipitation inches (mm)	3.56 (90)	4.22 (107)	2.53 (64)	0.61 (15)	0.48 (12)	0.13 (3.3)	0.04 (1.0)	0.00 (0.00)	0.13 (3.3)	0.61 (15)	0.92 (23)	2.44 (62)	15.67 (398)
Average precipitation days (≥ 0.01 in)	6.5	7.1	5.1	2.2	1.9	0.5	0.5	0.0	0.4	1.6	2.7	4.7	33.2
Source 1: NOAA
Source 2: National Weather Service (mean maxima/minima 1981–2010)

== Demographics ==
Historical population
Census	Pop.	Note	%±
1900	737		—
1920	2,640		—
1930	7,224		173.6%
1940	11,867		64.3%
1950	20,343		71.4%
1960	22,561		10.9%
1970	29,336		30.0%
1980	30,072		2.5%
1990	37,120		23.4%
2000	39,804		7.2%
2010	39,718		−0.2%
2020	39,568		−0.4%
2024 (est.)	37,926	▼	−4.1%
U.S. Decennial Census; 1860–1870 1880-1890; 1900 1910 1920; 1930 1940 1950; 1960 1970 1980; 1990 2000 2010; 2020

San Gabriel first appeared as a city in the 1920 U.S. census. In prior years, the area was part of the unincorporated portion of the now defunct San Gabriel Township (pop. 8,550 in 1910 and 2,501 in 1900).

=== Racial and ethnic composition ===
San Gabriel city, California – Racial and ethnic composition Note: the US Census treats Hispanic/Latino as an ethnic category. This table excludes Latinos from the racial categories and assigns them to a separate category. Hispanics/Latinos may be of any race.
Race / Ethnicity (NH = Non-Hispanic)	Pop 1980	Pop 1990	Pop 2000	Pop 2010	Pop 2020	% 1980	% 1990	% 2000	% 2010	% 2020
White alone (NH)	15,726	11,294	6,930	4,539	3,381	52.29%	30.43%	17.41%	11.43%	8.54%
Black or African American alone (NH)	157	357	360	337	355	0.52%	0.96%	0.90%	0.85%	0.90%
Native American or Alaska Native alone (NH)	124	113	129	55	42	0.41%	0.30%	0.32%	0.14%	0.11%
Asian alone (NH)	2,543	11,830	19,399	23,994	25,068	8.46%	31.87%	48.74%	60.41%	63.35%
Native Hawaiian or Pacific Islander alone (NH)	2,543	11,830	28	26	16	8.46%	31.87%	0.07%	0.07%	0.04%
Other race alone (NH)	31	55	51	44	100	0.10%	0.15%	0.13%	0.11%	0.25%
Mixed race or Multiracial (NH)	x	x	684	534	728	x	x	1.72%	1.34%	1.84%
Hispanic or Latino (any race)	11,491	13,471	12,223	10,189	9,878	38.21%	36.29%	30.71%	25.65%	24.96%
Total	30,072	37,120	39,804	39,718	39,568	100.00%	100.00%	100.00%	100.00%	100.00%

=== 2020 census ===
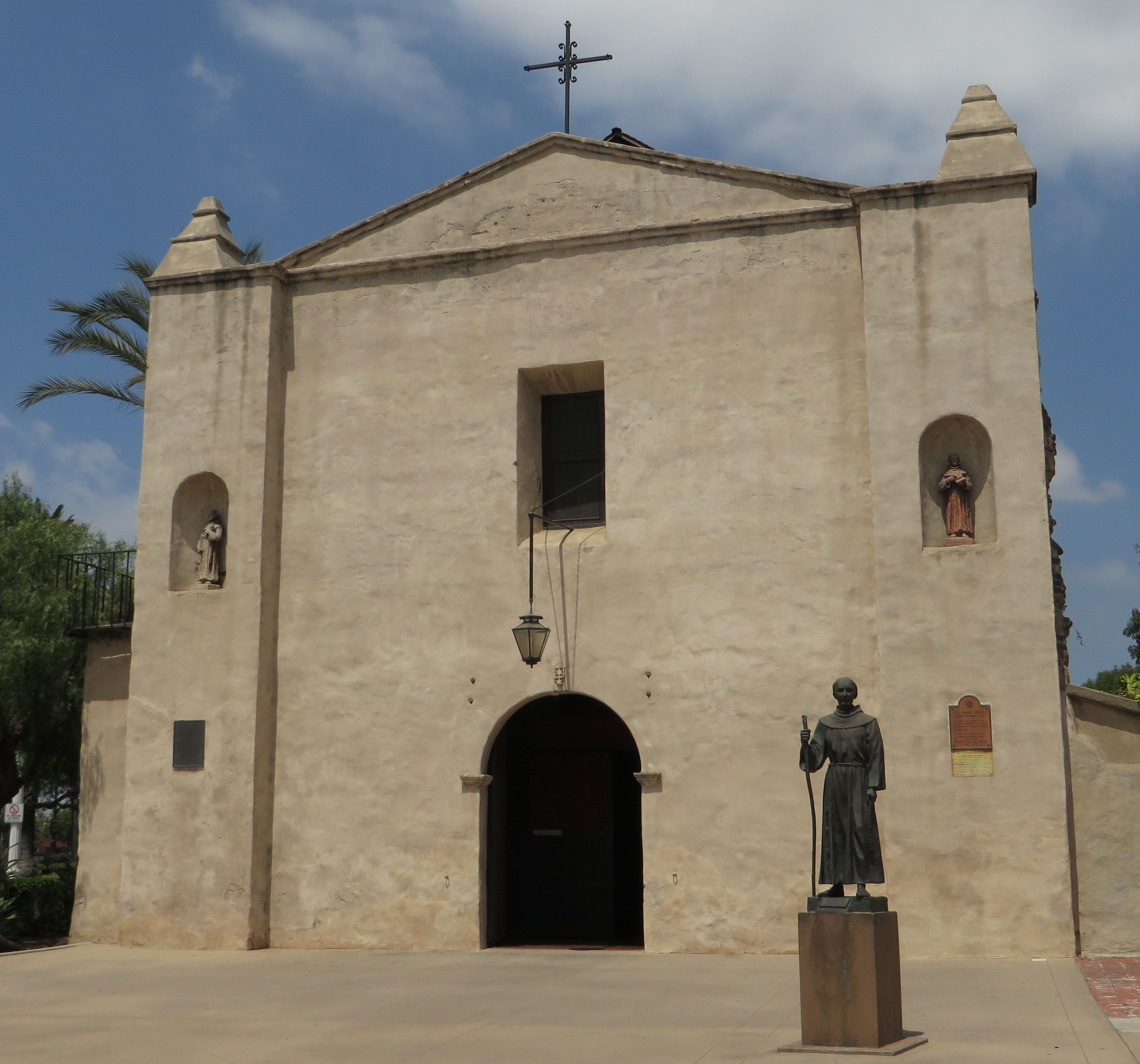
Mission San Gabriel Arcángel, designed by Antonio Cruzado

As of the 2020 census, San Gabriel had a population of 39,568 and a population density of 9,548.3 inhabitants per square mile (3,686.6/km^{2}). The median age was 42.8 years; 17.0% of residents were under age 18, 8.2% were aged 18 to 24, 27.3% were aged 25 to 44, 29.8% were aged 45 to 64, and 17.7% were age 65 or older. For every 100 females, there were 91.3 males, and for every 100 females age 18 and over, there were 89.0 males.

The census reported that 100.0% of residents lived in urban areas and 0.0% lived in rural areas. It also reported that 98.5% of the population lived in households, 0.4% lived in non-institutionalized group quarters, and 1.1% were institutionalized.

There were 12,890 households, of which 32.0% had children under the age of 18. Of all households, 49.9% were married-couple households, 4.7% were cohabiting-couple households, 17.6% had a male householder with no spouse or partner present, and 27.9% had a female householder with no spouse or partner present. About 17.1% of households were made up of individuals, and 6.9% had someone living alone who was 65 years of age or older. The average household size was 3.02. There were 9,758 families (75.7% of all households).

There were 13,461 housing units, of which 12,890 (95.8%) were occupied and 4.2% were vacant. Of occupied units, 45.9% were owner-occupied and 54.1% were occupied by renters. The homeowner vacancy rate was 0.8% and the rental vacancy rate was 3.2%.

=== 2023 estimate ===
In 2023, the US Census Bureau estimated that the median household income was $87,592, and the per capita income was $38,157. About 11.4% of families and 12.3% of the population were below the poverty line.

=== 2010 census ===
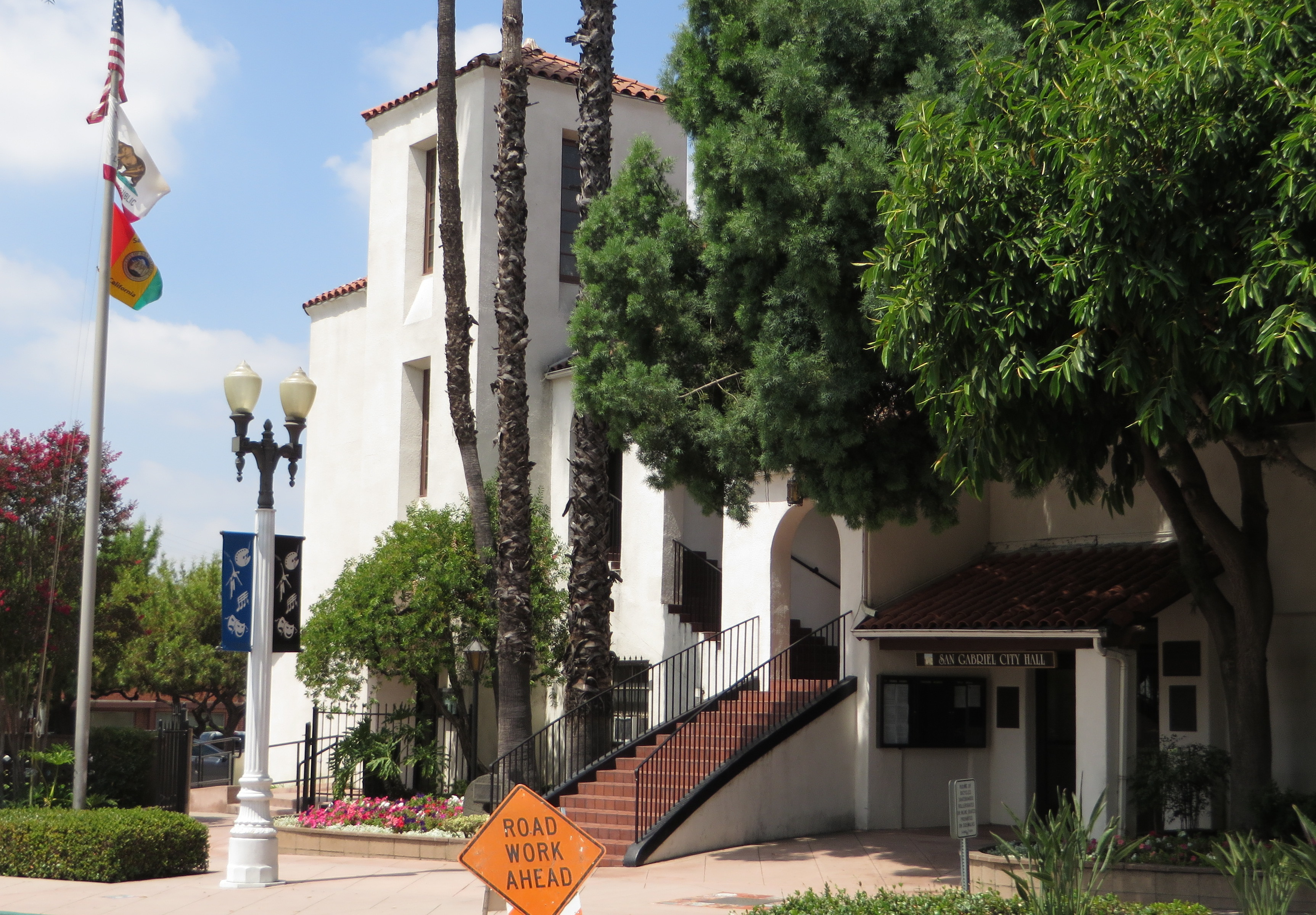
San Gabriel City Hall

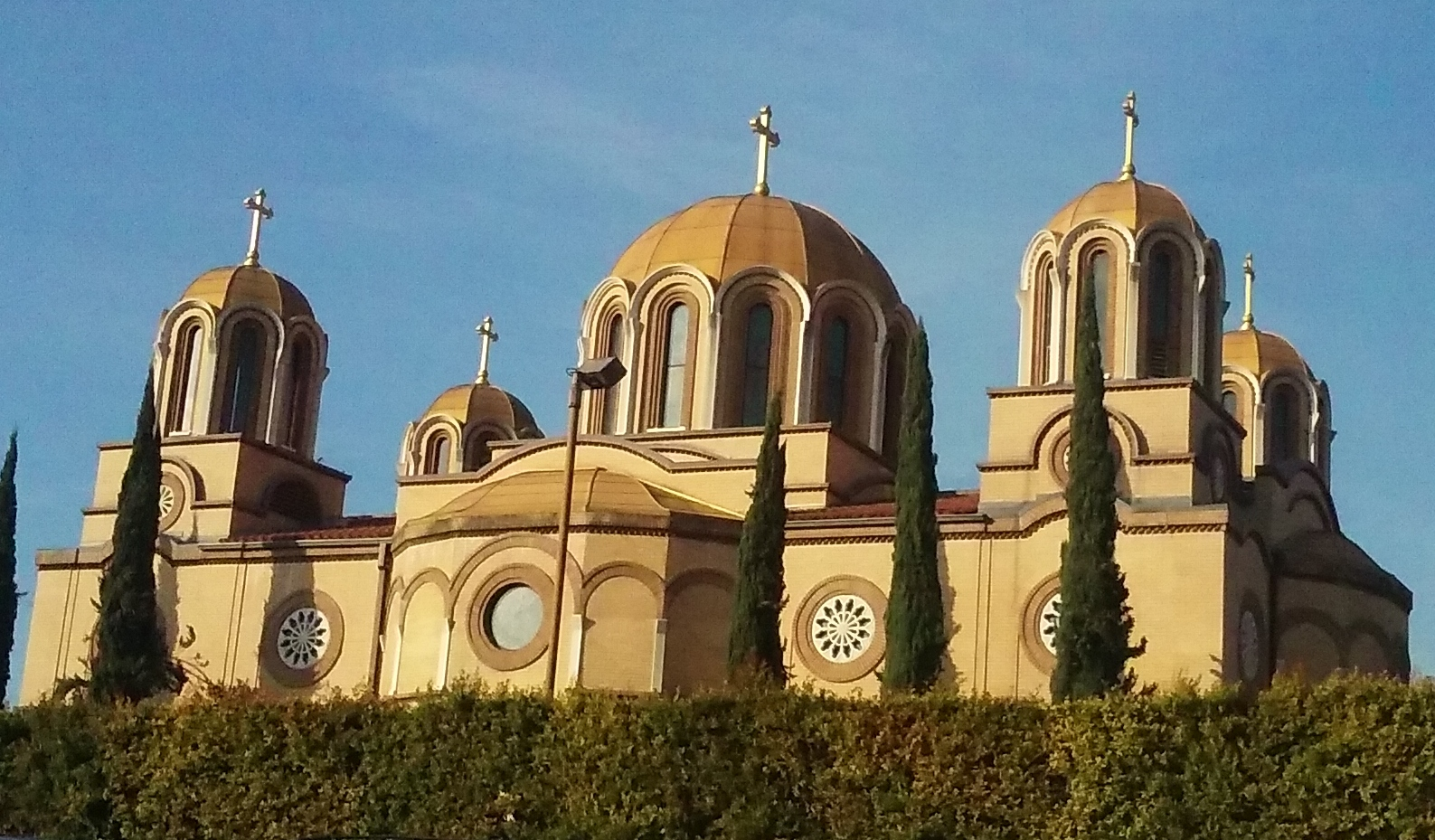
St. Sava Orthodox Church

The 2010 United States census reported that San Gabriel had a population of 39,718. The population density was 9,581.5 inhabitants per square mile (3,699.4/km^{2}). The racial makeup of San Gabriel was 24,091 (60.7%) Asian, 10,076 (25.4%) White (11.4% Non-Hispanic White), 388 (1.0%) African American, 220 (0.6%) Native American, 43 (0.1%) Pacific Islander, 3,762 (9.5%) from other races, and 1,138 (2.9%) from two or more races. Hispanic or Latino of any race were 10,189 persons (25.7%).

The Census reported that 39,266 people (98.9% of the population) lived in households, 34 (0.1%) lived in non-institutionalized group quarters, and 418 (1.1%) were institutionalized.

There were 12,542 households, out of which 4,542 (36.2%) had children under the age of 18 living in them, 6,668 (53.2%) were opposite-sex married couples living together, 1,961 (15.6%) had a female householder with no husband present, 965 (7.7%) had a male householder with no wife present. There were 481 (3.8%) unmarried opposite-sex partnerships, and 76 (0.6%) same-sex married couples or partnerships. 2,121 households (16.9%) were made up of individuals, and 800 (6.4%) had someone living alone who was 65 years of age or older. The average household size was 3.13. There were 9,594 families (76.5% of all households); the average family size was 3.47.

The population was spread out, with 7,866 people (19.8%) under the age of 18, 3,555 people (9.0%) aged 18 to 24, 11,335 people (28.5%) aged 25 to 44, 11,388 people (28.7%) aged 45 to 64, and 5,574 people (14.0%) who were 65 years of age or older. The median age was 40.3 years. For every 100 females, there were 93.2 males. For every 100 females age 18 and over, there were 90.6 males.

There were 13,237 housing units at an average density of 3,193.3 per square mile (1,232.9/km^{2}), of which 6,168 (49.2%) were owner-occupied, and 6,374 (50.8%) were occupied by renters. The homeowner vacancy rate was 1.0%; the rental vacancy rate was 5.7%. 19,974 people (50.3% of the population) lived in owner-occupied housing units and 19,292 people (48.6%) lived in rental housing units.

=== Ancestry ===
According to the Los Angeles Times, Chinese and Mexican were the most ancestries in 2000, with 52.6% of residents foreign born, Vietnam and China being the most common places of birth.

== Economy ==
=== Top employers ===
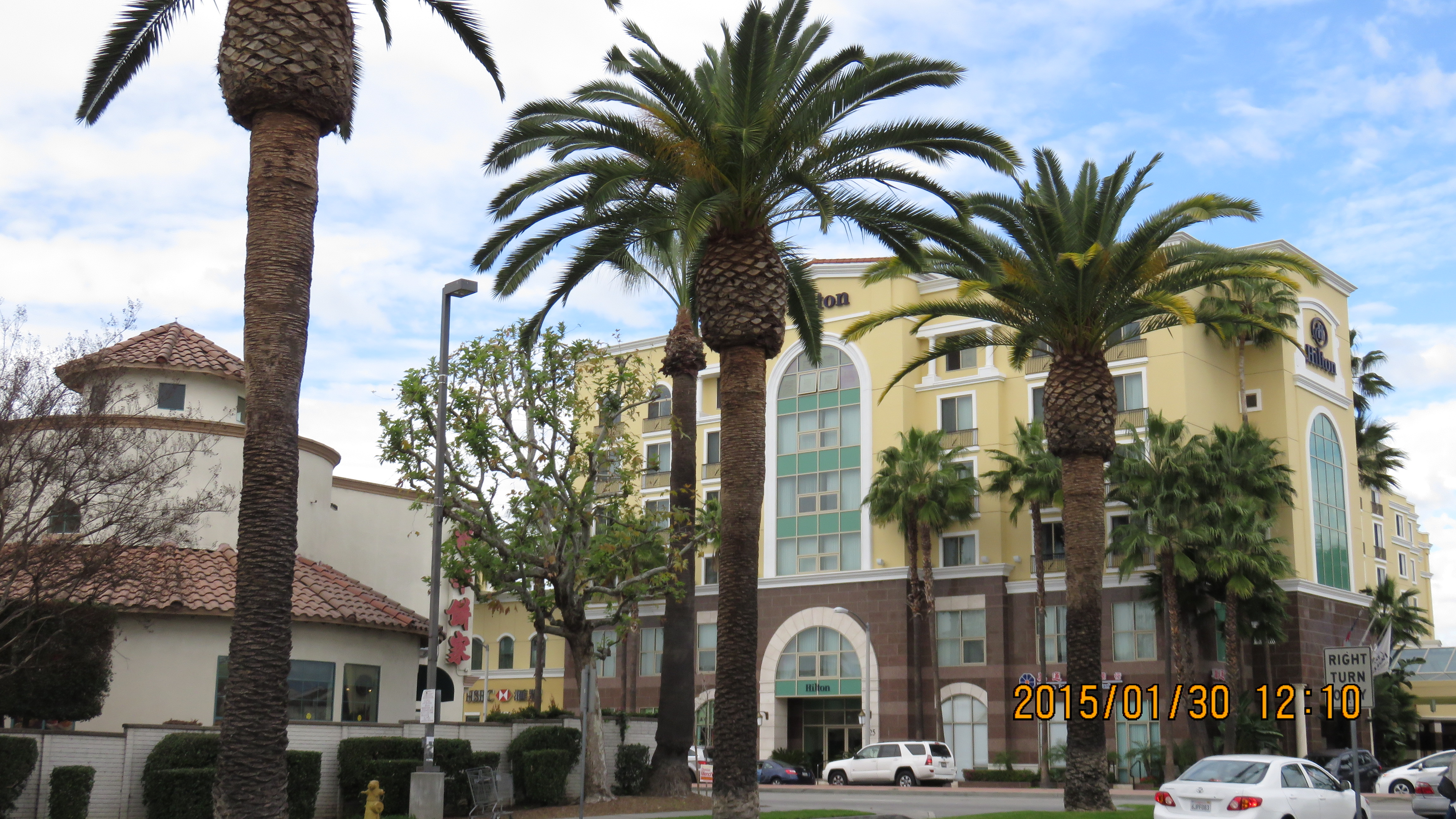
Businesses on Valley Blvd.

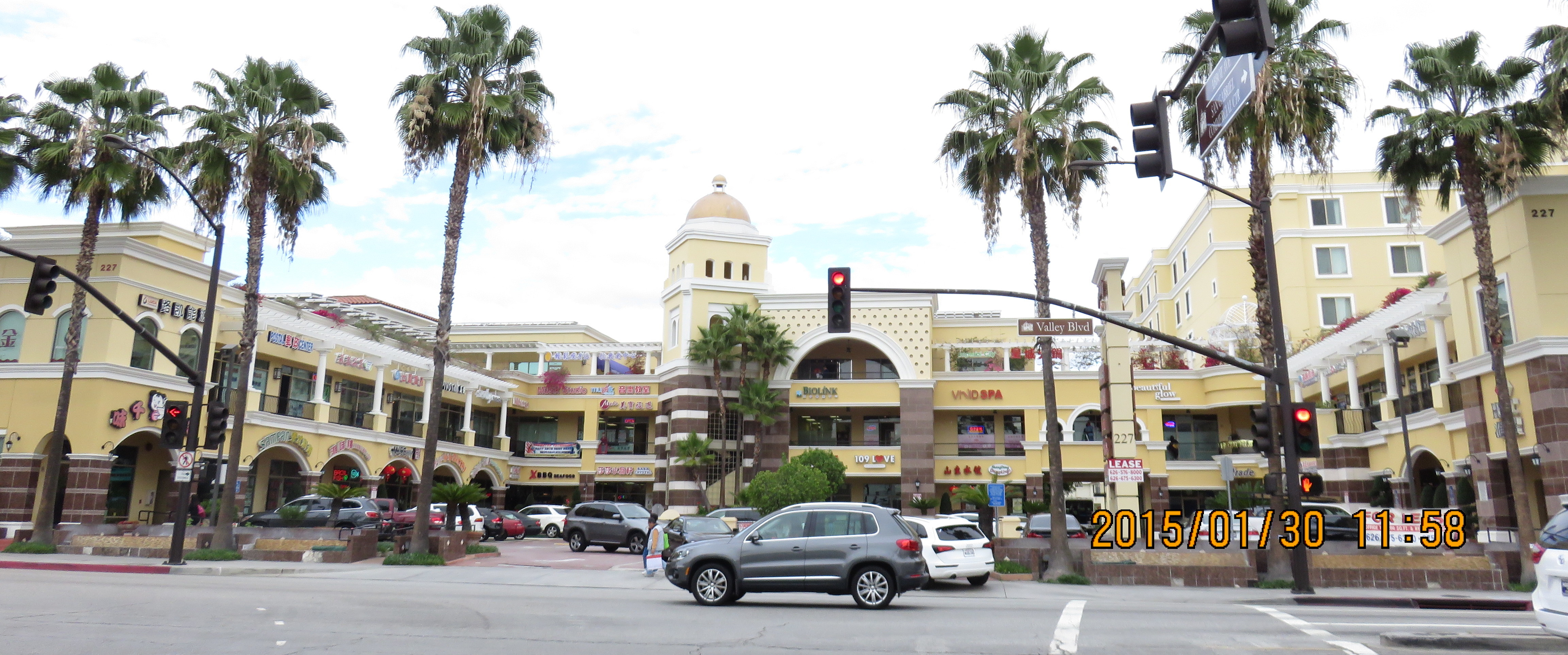
Shops near the intersection of Abbot Ave and Valley Blvd.

According to the city's 2019 Comprehensive Annual Financial Report, the top employers in the city are:

#	Employer	# of Employees
1	AHMC San Gabriel Valley Medical	1062
2	Landwin Hospitality LLC	150
3	Ivy Creek Healthcare & Wellness Centre	147
4	SGV Healthcare Inc.	147
5	99 Ranch Market #208	143
6	Royal Vista Care Center, LLC	123
7	San Gabriel Country Club	120
8	Pine Grove Healthcare & Wellness Centre	116
9	Five Star Seafood Restaurant	105
10	San Gabriel Superstore	105

== Government ==
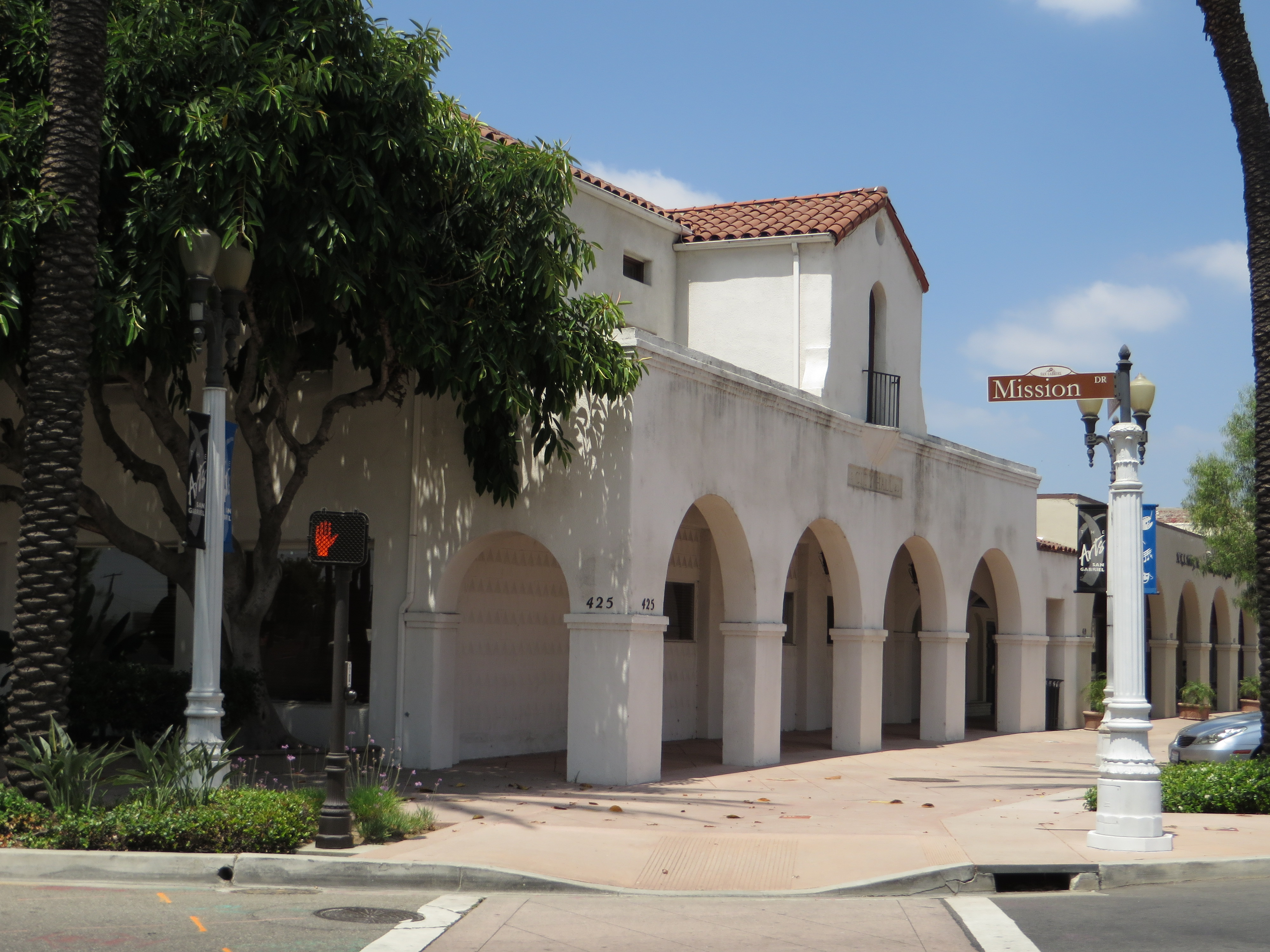
San Gabriel City Hall on Mission Dr.

In the state legislature San Gabriel is located in the 25th senatorial district, represented by Democrat Sasha Renée Pérez, and in the 49th Assembly district, represented by Democrat Mike Fong.

In the United States House of Representatives, San Gabriel is in California's 28th congressional district, represented by Democrat Judy Chu.

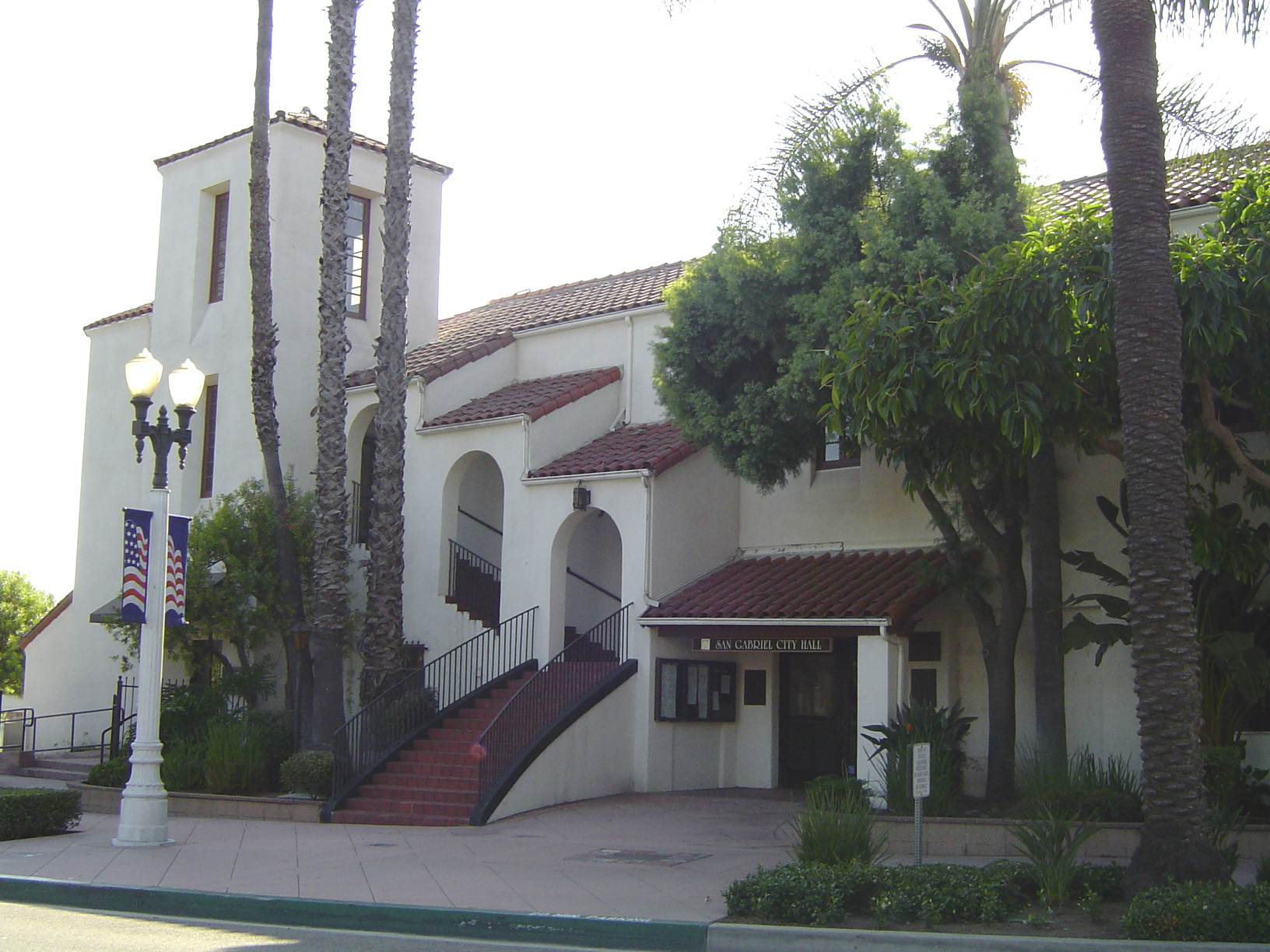
View of San Gabriel City Hall from the Plaza de San Gabriel

=== City ===
Five councilmembers are elected by the voters to serve a four-year term. The Mayor is appointed annually by the Council in a rotation among its members. The City Council is also the Redevelopment Agency Board of Directors. As of July 2024, the members are Mayor John Wu, Vice Mayor Denise Menchaca, and Councilmembers Eric Chan, Tony Ding, and John R. Harrington.

The city's first Chinese American mayor was Chi Mui in 2006. He symbolized San Gabriel's rise as the new center of the region's Chinese community. He died of cancer three months later. Mui was replaced by Albert Y. M. Huang, who served as mayor during his term. Huang submitted his resignation October 19, 2010, following a late-night domestic dispute with his girlfriend and subsequent arrest. Huang has since been cleared of all charges.

== Politics ==
United States presidential election results for San Gabriel, California
Year	Republican		Democratic		Third party(ies)	
Year	No.	%	No.	%	No.	%
2000	2,833	36.56%	4,625	59.69%	290	3.74%
2004	2,938	40.55%	4,230	58.39%	77	1.06%
2008	4,033	36.39%	6,829	61.62%	220	1.99%
2012	3,265	32.47%	6,567	65.31%	223	2.22%
2016	2,849	26.76%	7,262	68.22%	534	5.02%
2020	4,690	32.08%	9,651	66.01%	280	1.92%
2024	4,702	37.68%	7,379	59.13%	398	3.19%

San Gabriel is a solidly Democratic city at the presidential level, although there was a notable trend towards the Republican Party from 2016 to 2024. This followed a trend towards the Democrats from 2008 to 2016.

== Education ==
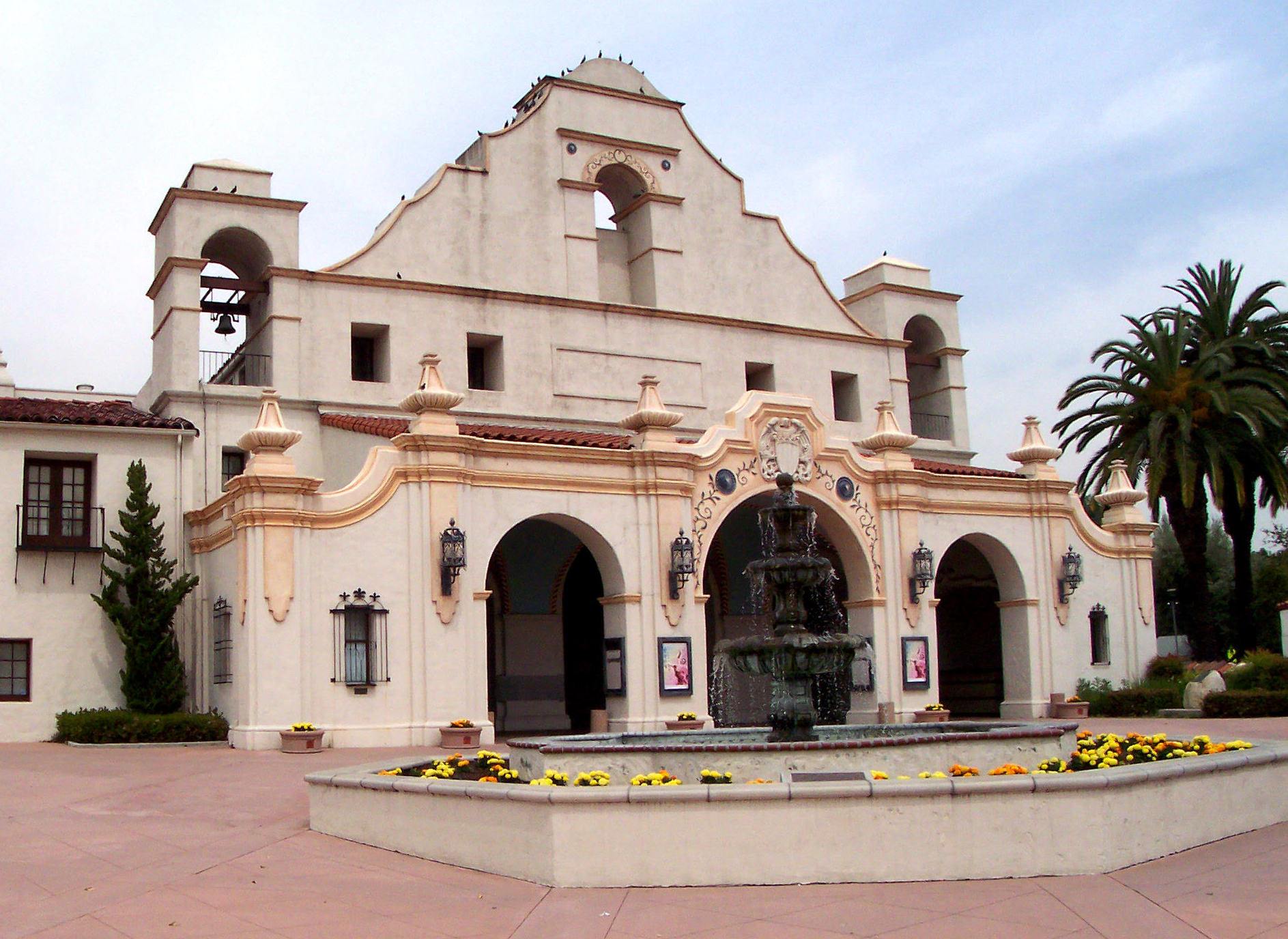
San Gabriel Mission Playhouse

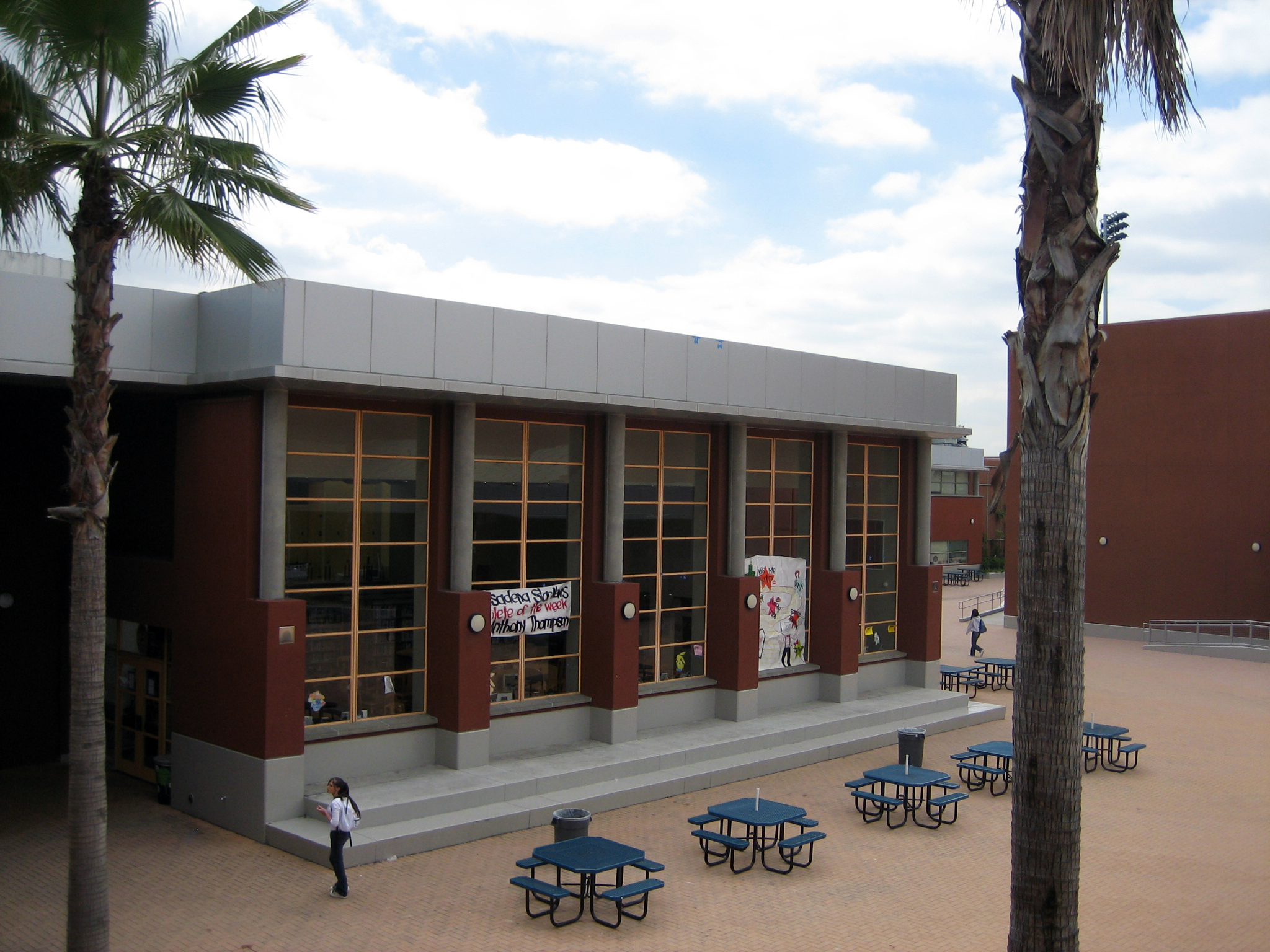
Gabrielino High School

The vast majority of the city of San Gabriel is served by the San Gabriel Unified School District. It has five of the public elementary schools, Jefferson Middle School, Gabrielino High School, Del Mar High School, which opened in 2010, is an alternative high school.

A portion of San Gabriel is in the Garvey School District and the Alhambra Unified School District. Two elementary schools that exist within the city limits are operated by the Garvey School District, in the southern portion of San Gabriel. San Gabriel High School is operated by Alhambra USD .

A portion of San Gabriel is in the Rosemead Elementary School District and the El Monte Union High School District.

San Gabriel Mission High School is a Catholic, all girls school.

== Media ==
San Gabriel community news are covered by the San Gabriel Valley Tribune, a paid daily newspaper, as well as by Mid-Valley News and San Gabriel Sun, which are community weeklies.

The independent, non-corporate community newspaper Colorado Boulevard Newspaper covers the city of San Gabriel both in print and online, along with neighboring cities in the western San Gabriel Valley.

== Culture ==
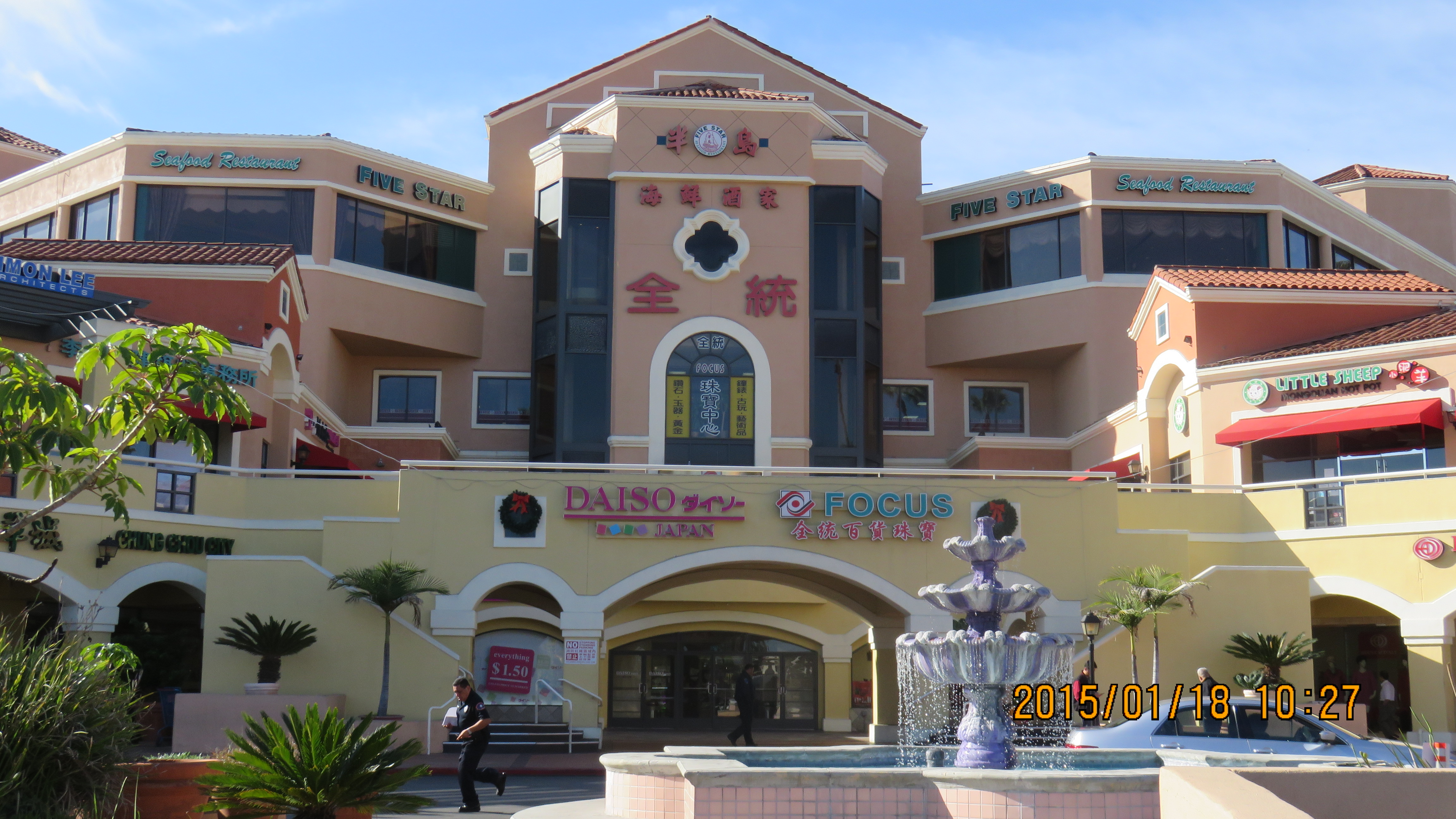
Shopping near the intersection of Del Mar Ave. and Valley Blvd in 2015

The city has a mixture of Asian, European, and North American cultures. Second- and third-generation Chinese Americans patronize its diverse array of stores and eateries.

There is the 12-acre (49,000 m^{2}) "San Gabriel Square" mall, sometimes referred to as the "Chinese Disneyland". It was also nicknamed by the Los Angeles Times as "the great mall of China." This stretch of Chinese shops and bold architecture, with roofs of Spanish-style tile, is the model for the new ethnoburbs recently recognized in places like Las Vegas and Houston.

== Transportation ==
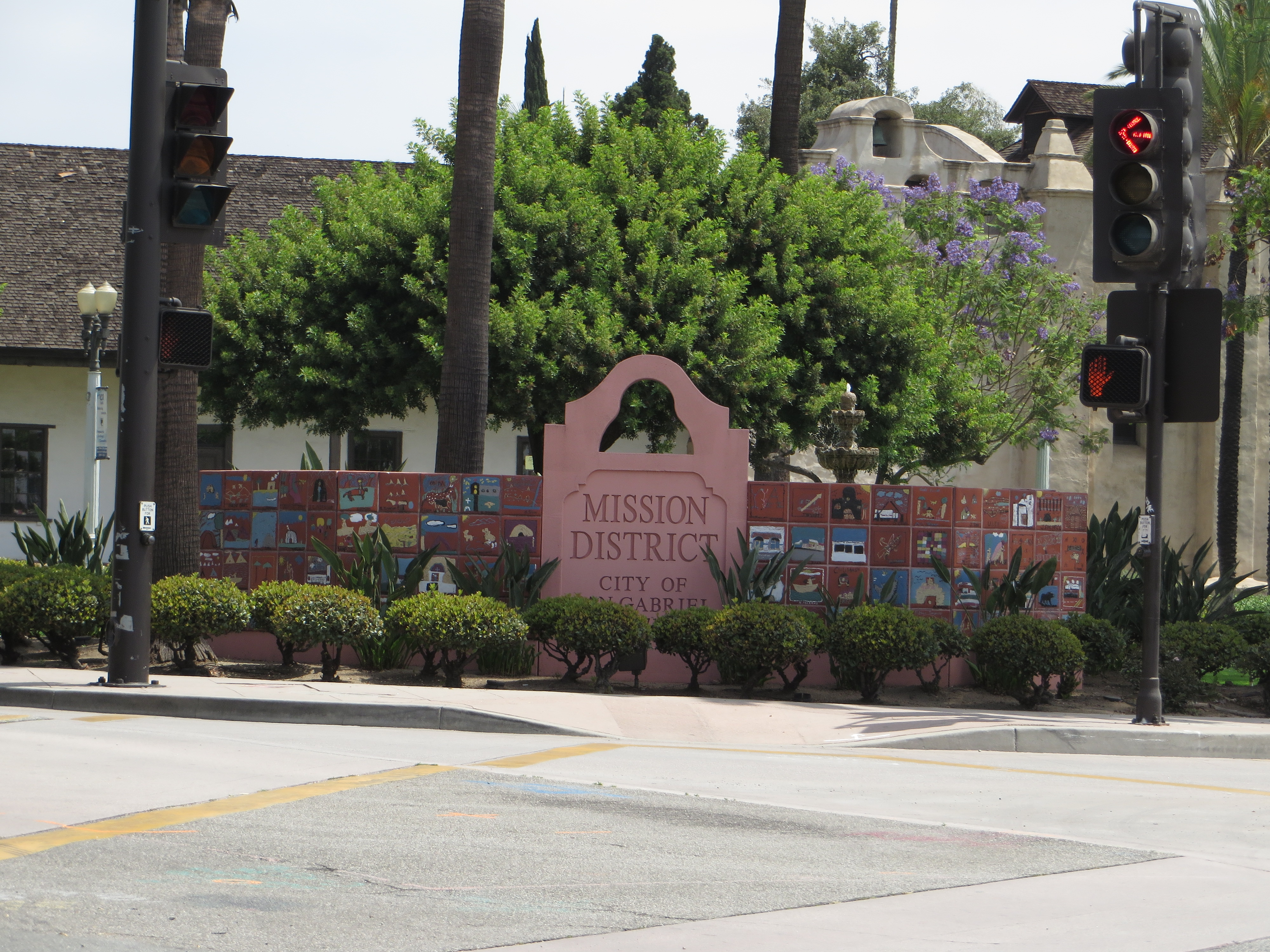
The Mission District

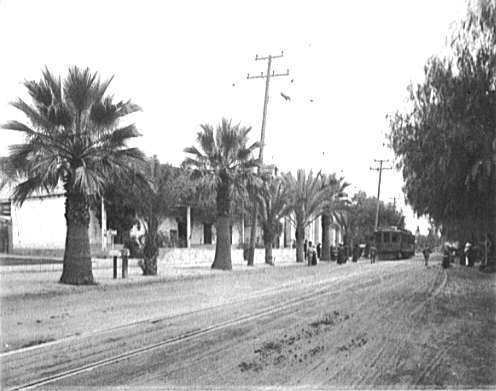
A streetcar of the Pacific Electric Railway makes a stop at Mission San Gabriel Arcángel c. 1905.

San Gabriel is currently served by the Los Angeles County Metropolitan Transportation Authority.

In 2008, voters approved the measure, proposition 1A for the California High Speed Rail Project from San Diego to San Francisco. The project will be constructed in two segments. The San Francisco to Los Angeles/Anaheim project is scheduled to be built first, at a cost of $43 billion, with a completion date in 2029. The second phase of the proposed railway, from Los Angeles to stations in San Diego will not begin construction until after phase one is completed. The California High-Speed Rail Authority is responsible for planning, designing, and building the system.

Conceptually, the voters were very enthusiastic about a high speed railway. The reality of the possibility that it could impact their neighborhood and their homes is being met with steadfast disapproval. When the California High-Speed Rail Authority recently met with the city councils and residents of San Gabriel, El Monte, Rosemead and Alhambra, to discuss the four proposed routes for phase two, the members of the three city councils expressed that residents were very concerned that the railway could possibly end up in their backyards. Mayor David Gutierrez said, "We made a promise to the community that the city of San Gabriel will never allow anything like this to happen if there is any consideration that people might lose their home." No decisions will be made until environmental impact and evaluation of the various proposed routes are completed in 2014.

== Notable people ==
- Rick Aguilera, Major League Baseball pitcher, was born in San Gabriel
- Hank Aguirre, Major League Baseball pitcher
- Susan Atkins, convicted murderer, associate of Charles Manson
- Judge Roy Bean, notorious Wild West figure
- Jesse Chavez, Major League Baseball pitcher
- Francisco Dumetz, missionary
- Mike Garcia, Major League Baseball pitcher
- Curly Howard, comedian and actor
- Ward Kimball, animator for Disney
- Mike Krukow, Major League Baseball pitcher and TV commentator
- Billy Laughlin, child actor
- Dee Luong, poker player
- Gary McCord, pro golfer and TV commentator
- Angela Morales, writer
- Bill Mumy, actor
- Danny Patterson, Major League Baseball pitcher
- George S. Patton, World War II general
- Pio Pico, last Mexican Governor of California
- Luis J. Rodriguez, poet and writer
- Allan Sandage, astronomer
- Tex Schramm, original general manager of the Dallas Cowboys; born in San Gabriel
- Laurence Trimble, silent film actor
- Louis Vitale, priest and peace activist
- Kurt Vollers, pro football player
- Joanna Wang, singer-songwriter

== Sister cities ==
- Changhua City (Changhua County, Taiwan) - (since 1986)

== See also ==
- Chinese enclaves in the San Gabriel Valley
