= Isanthcogna, California =

Isanthcogna
- Former settlement
- Location in California
- Coordinates: 34°01′45″N 118°04′08″W
- Country: United States of America
- State: California
- County: Los Angeles
- Elevation: 203 ft (62 m)

Isanthcogna is a former Tongva-Gabrieleño Native American settlement in Los Angeles County, California.

It was located at Mission Vieja, near Rancho San Pascual and Mission San Gabriel Arcángel, in Whittier Narrows area of the San Gabriel Valley.

== See also ==
- Category: Tongva populated places
  - Tongva language
- California mission clash of cultures
- Ranchos in California
