= Wáꞌpeat =

Former Desert Serrano village

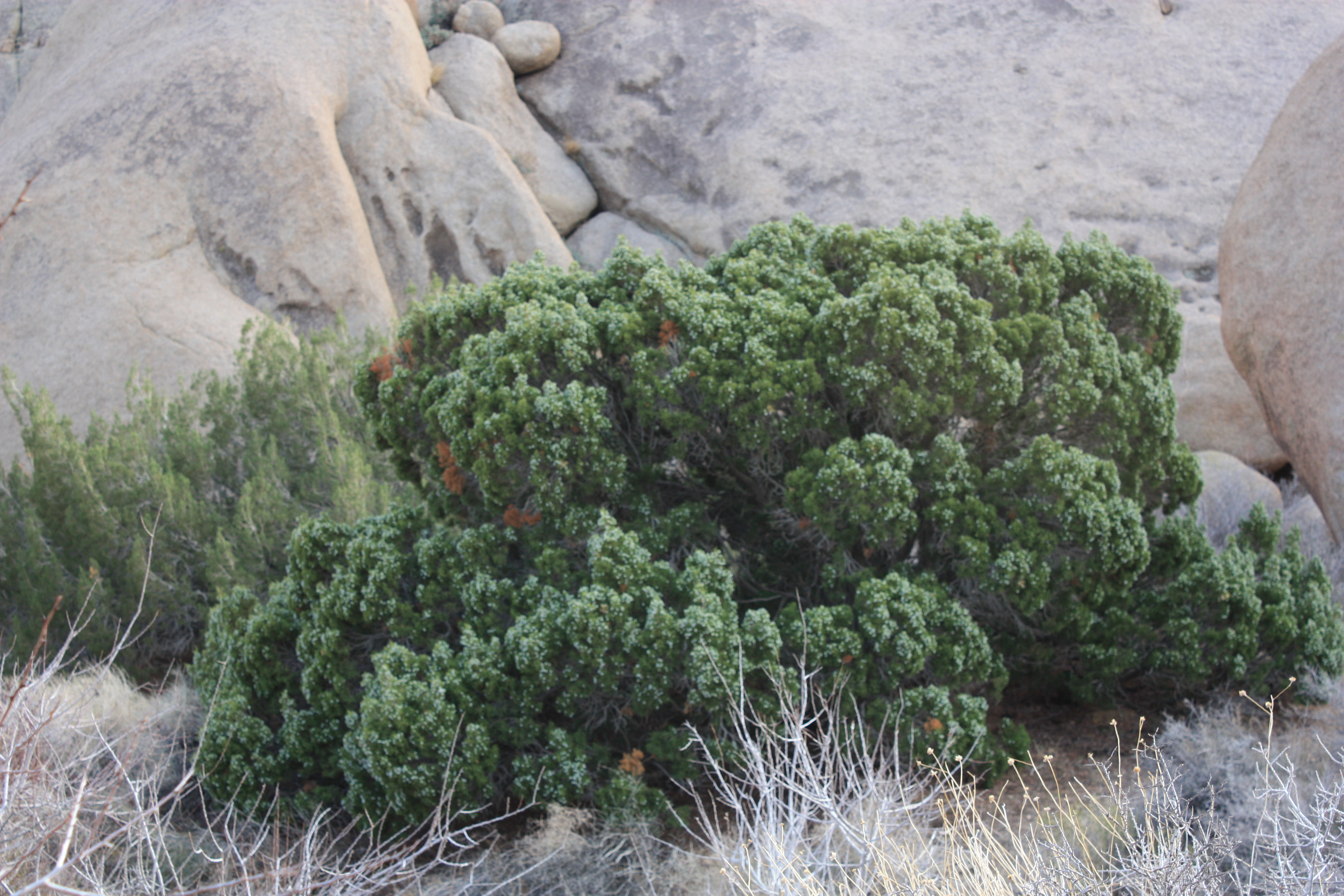
Desert Serrano people referred to the California juniper (pictured) as waꞌat, from which the village name Wáꞌpeat is derived.

Wáꞌpeat (Hispanicized: Guapiabit) was a major village populated by the Serrano or Vanyume, closest situated to what is now Hesperia and Crestline, and within the vicinity of Cajon Pass and Silverwood Lake, California. The village name was derived from waꞌat, or the Serrano word for juniper, which grew abundantly in the area. Wáꞌpeat had deep ties with other villages along the Mojave River and the southern Antelope Valley and was the site of community gatherings.

The village site was registered by the Office of Historic Preservation in California in 1975. In 2020, it was listed in the National Register of Historic Places as the Guapiabit–Serrano Homeland Archaeological District.

== History ==
Wá’peat was closely situated with other Serrano villages of Atongaibit, Kaiuvit (Serrano village located at Deep Creek), and Amutskupiabit (located in Cajon Pass). It was a distinct clan village. Juniper berries were grown in abundance, along with pinyon pine nuts and black oak acorns, which grew on the slopes of the San Bernardino Mountains. Acorns were also central to a multi-village acorn-gathering festival and may have been part of political allyship between villages. Other foods included honey mesquite, carrizo grass sugar, yucca, and likely to a smaller extent prickly pear cactus.

=== Colonial era ===
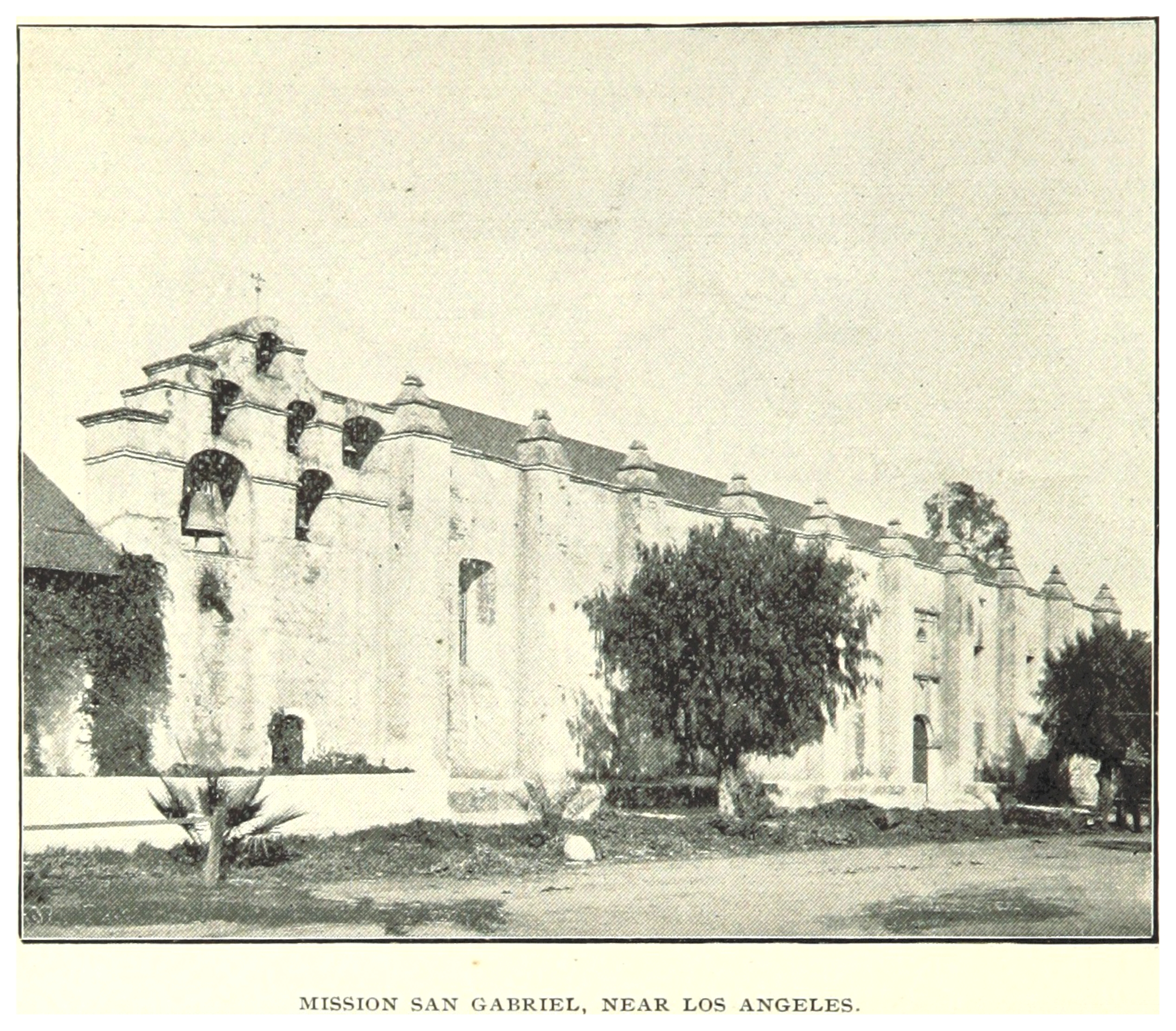
In 1808, people who escaped Mission San Gabriel (pictured) took refuge at Wá’peat. When confronted by a Spanish soldier for their return, the chief of the village refused.

In 1776, one Spanish traveler through Wá’peat indicated that there were about 80 people at the village, while in 1806 another traveler estimated that there was about 46, indicating a population decline likely attributed to the growth of the Spanish missions in the Los Angeles Basin area. By 1806, at least 86 people from the village had already been recorded in baptismal records at Mission San Fernando and Mission San Gabriel.

In 1808, Spanish soldier José Palomares visited the village in his pursuit of Indigenous peoples who had run away from Mission San Gabriel. Palomares first came upon the village of Atongaibit on the upper Mojave River, which he described as "virtually deserted." He was told that most of the village inhabitants were attending an acorn-gathering festival in the neighboring village of Wá’peat. Many villagers from numerous villages along the Mojave River were present at this acorn festival. Upon observeration, Palomares noted that the chief of the village was sheltering people who escaped Mission San Gabriel. When Palomares attempted to negotiate for these "neophyte refugees," the chief refused.

In between 1811 and 1815, it was noted in baptismal records at Mission San Gabriel that the village had marriage ties with Atongaibit (7 marriages) and Amutskupiabit (17 marriages).

In 1819, a hunting party led by Gabriel Moraga was sent after the Mohave. On the journey, Joaquin Pasqual Nuez accompanied the soldiers and kept a diary, noting that the expedition camped at Wá’peat on November 25, where they suffered "a painful night because of the excessive cold." They then spent another day at the village before traveling to Atongaibit (Hesperia).

=== Depletion ===
By the 1830s, Wá’peat was abandoned, largely with the influx of European presence in the region through the use of the Old Spanish Trail.

In 1885, the presence of junipers in what had been the village area were destroyed, many of which were uprooted and their roots burned as firewood for bakeries in Los Angeles.

== See also ==
- Kaawchama
- Putiidhem
- Toviscanga
- Yaanga

== Notes ==
Wá’peat was located at the center of an extensive territory, as noted by J.P. Harrington: "After passing Hesperia perhaps 5 miles towards the Cajon Pass, we came to the place called Wá’peat. This is a placename that covers a tremendous territory, comprising the whole region between there and the summit of the Cajon Pass and extending from Huắveat to the Yumaward to many miles over Los Angelesward of the auto road—way over to Sebastian’s [Amutskayam] country. The plain was grown quite thickly with guata [juniper] and it must have produced a tremendous amount of that food for the Indians antes [before]."

Archaeological evidence of the village has found that it was "especially important because an abundance of both ethnohistorical and archaeological data make clear that it was a long-occupied, nucleated settlement."
