= Shevaanga =

Sibagna
- Former settlement
- Location in California
- Coordinates: 34°05′50″N 118°06′28″W
- Country: United States
- State: California
- County: Los Angeles County
- Elevation: 430 ft (131 m)

Shevaanga or Sibagna (or Sibanga) is a former Tongva village located at the area of what would become San Gabriel, California. It was closely situated to the village of Toviscanga. It lay at an elevation of 430 feet (131 m). It was located near Mission San Gabriel Arcángel and the Whittier Narrows, in the San Gabriel Valley.

== History ==
The chief of the village was known as Sibavie, as it was customary for the chief of a Tongva village to adopt the name of the village followed by an -ie suffix, such as Asucsagna to Asucsagnie. Residents of the village were referred to as Sibapet.

=== Colonial period and decline ===
It was located the original site of San Gabriel Mission established in 1771, before the mission was destroyed in a flood and then rebuilt at the nearby village of Toviscanga in 1776. The village declined and eventually disappeared with the growth and expansion of the mission.

The village was the birthplace of an Indigenous man referred to by the Spanish as Nicolás Josè, who was publicly an early convert of the Spanish, yet privately continued to practice traditional dances and activities. He participated in a failed revolt against the missions in 1779 and was instrumental in the major revolt of eight villages against the mission in 1785 along with Toypurina. Josè admitted that he participated in the rebellion because the Spanish ban on dances in their villages was not tolerable.

== See also ==
- Achooykomenga
- Puvunga
- Yaanga
