= Chowigna, California =

Former Native American settlement in California

Chowigna
- Former settlement
- Location in California
- Coordinates: 33°46′N 118°22′W
- Country: United States
- State: California
- County: Los Angeles County
- Elevation: 1,188 ft (362 m)

Chowigna (also, Unaungna) is a former Tongva-Gabrieleño Native American settlement in Los Angeles County, California.

It was located in modern-day Palos Verdes Estates, Palos Verdes Peninsula.

Name variations include: Chowiinga, Chowi, Unaungna, Chowigna, and Chowingna (near San Pedro).

The Chowigna Village site at Malaga Cove has been inhabited for at least 7,100 years. It was first described by the Cabrillo Expedition in 1542. It was excavated in 1936–37 by the Southwest Museum of the Native Americans and the University of Southern California. Among the thousands of artifacts retrieved were "arrowheads, mortars and pestles, scrapers and spoons made from abalone, beads and art objects, bone tools, shells," including olivella and giant keyhole limpet shells, "and bones from food animals like mussels and birds ... An estimated 150 people lived at the site in its last days, about 1775." "The site stratigraphy and material culture assemblage provided the central framework of early cultural chronological sequences for the region."

Artifacts of the Chowigna Native Americans are held by the Southwest Museum of the Native Americans and the Redondo Beach Historical Museum.

The Chowigna Natives used the site of today's Hopkins Wilderness Park, formerly Nike missile site LA-57 from 1956 to 1963, in Redondo Beach as a lookout place. The wetlands located at the site of today's AES power plant in Redondo Beach were a source of foods including halibut, lobster, and sea bass, and also of salt. In the 18th century, the Chowigna bartered salt from the old Redondo Salt Lake, "a spring-fed salt lake about 200 yards wide and 600 yards long situated about 200 yards from the ocean", with other tribes. Their village by the lake was called "Onoova-nga", or "Place of Salt." The Chowigna were relocated to missions in 1854, when Manuel Dominguez sold 215 acres of Rancho San Pedro, including the lake, to Henry Allanson and William Johnson for the Pacific Salt Works.

The Chowigna rancheria was associated with the Mission San Gabriel Arcángel.

== See also ==
- Category: Tongva populated places
  - Tongva language
- California mission clash of cultures
