= Pimocagna, California =

Pimocagna (also, Pinioocagna) is a former Tongva-Gabrieleño Native American settlement in Los Angeles County, California. It was located at the Andrés Ybarra "Ybarra Ranch" in the Los Angeles area, who also owned the Rancho Las Encinitas.

== See also ==
- Category: Tongva populated places
  - Tongva language
- California mission clash of cultures
- Ranchos in California
