= Vincent Lugo Park =

- La Laguna de San Gabriel
- U.S. National Register of Historic Places
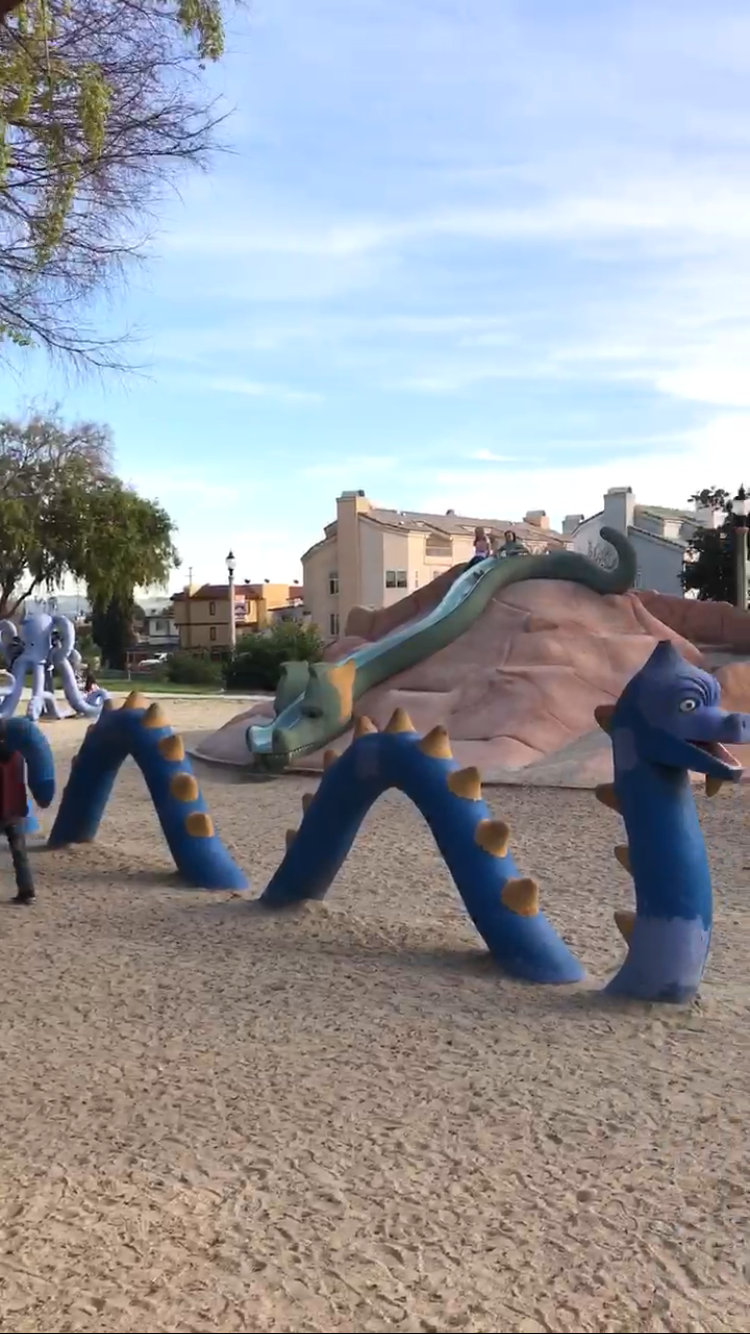
- Vincent Lugo Park - 2017 Feb 13

- Location within the Los Angeles metropolitan area Location within California Location within the United States
- Location: 300 W. Wells St. San Gabriel, California
- Coordinates: 34°05′01″N 118°06′16″W
- Built: 1965
- Architectural style: Folk art
- MPS: Latinos in 20th Century California
- NRHP reference No.: 100000462
- Added to NRHP: January 11, 2017

Vincent Lugo Park is the largest park in the city of San Gabriel, California, United States. Park grounds include lighted youth baseball diamond, youth multi-purpose athletic field, Laguna de San Gabriel Nautical (Dinosaur) Playground, picnic tables, barbecues, restrooms and the Girl Scout House.

== La Laguna ==
One feature of Vincent Lugo Park is a children's playground, sometimes referred to as "La Laguna de San Gabriel" or "Monster Park." La Laguna was created by Mexican-American artist Benjamin Dominguez. The park’s play structures include 14 "friendly looking cement sea creatures rising out of the sand for children to play on." The sand-filled lagoon includes Minnie the whale, Stella the starfish, Ozzie the octopus, and Flipper, Speedy and Peanut, three colorful dolphins. The playground was placed on the National Register of Historic Places on January 11, 2017.

== Park History ==
In 1965, Vincent Lugo was parks supervisor for the City of San Gabriel, and was chiefly responsible for converting a city landfill into the San Gabriel Municipal Park – lauded for transforming trash into beauty. Because of his contributions to San Gabriel as a city employee for over 30 years, and because of his vision to beautify those nine acres of city dump, Vincent Lugo was remembered in a 1988 re-dedication of Municipal Park, which was renamed Vincent Lugo Park in his honor.

In 2006, city park renovation plans sought to demolish the structures, deeming them safety hazards. But in the years since, locals organized as the Friends of La Laguna have fought for the playground’s preservation and renovation.

In 2008, Friends of La Laguna commissioned a Historic Structures Report and Preservation Plan. This assessment was funded through a Third Round California Cultural and Historic Endowment Grant and funding from the Annenberg Foundation. The assessment was honored with awards from the LA Conservancy and the California Preservation Foundation in 2009.

In 2009, La Laguna playground was successfully nominated to the California Register of Historic Places. It was also designated a local landmark for the City of San Gabriel.

The park was closed for renovation for almost 18 months in 2011-2012.

As a result of the work of the Friends of La Laguna, the State Historic Resources Commission nominated the playground for the National Register of Historic Places in 2016. “It is historic,” said City Manager Steve Preston in a statement. “It is a cultural landscape, and it is an active, living playground.”

== Gallery ==
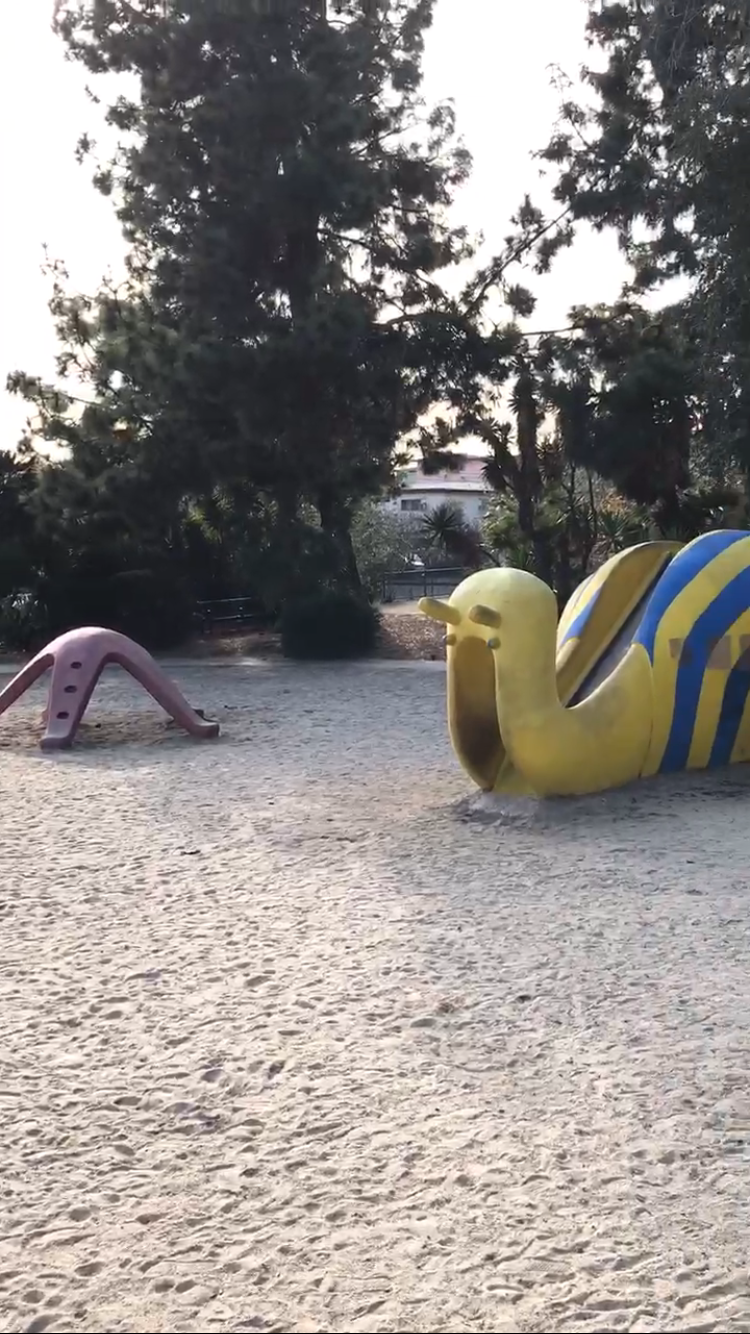
Vincent Lugo Park - 2017 Feb 13

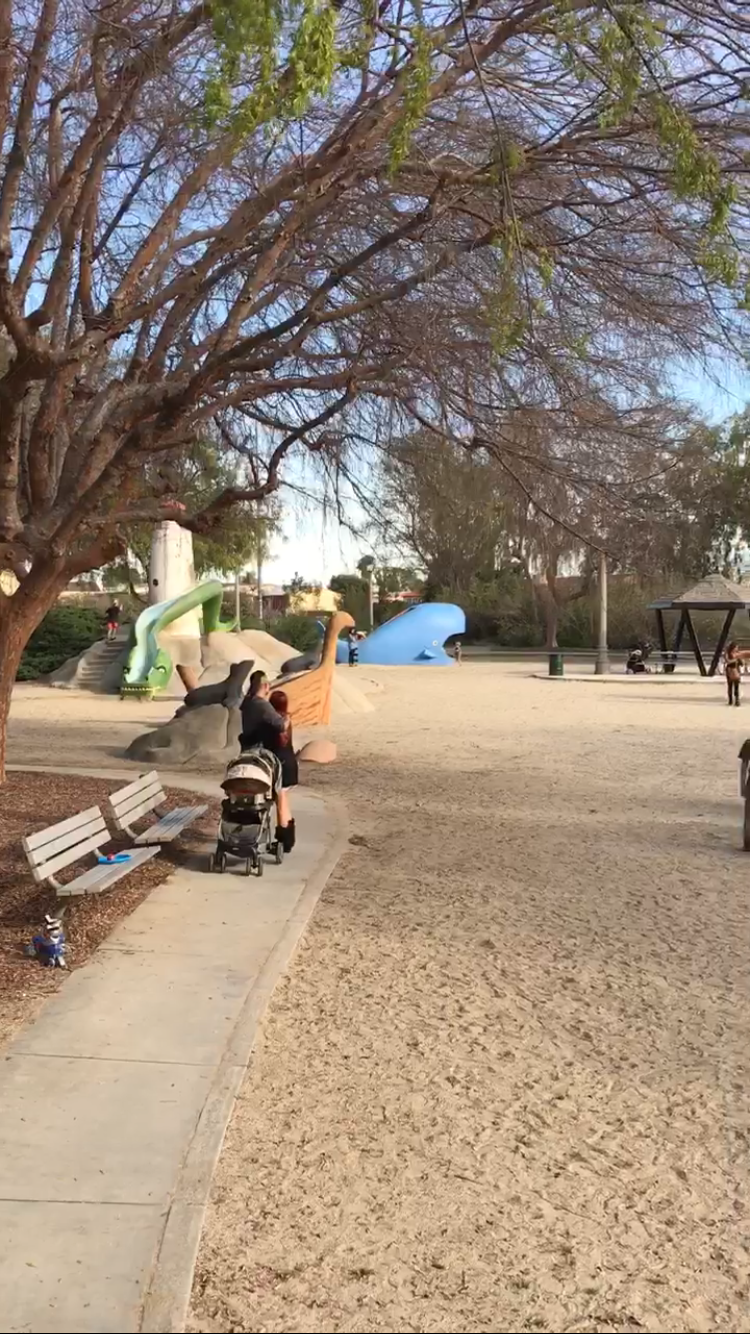
Vincent Lugo Park - 2017 Feb 13
