= Houtgna, California =

Former settlement in California

Houtgna (also Huutgna) is a former Tongva settlement in Los Angeles County, California. It was located at Ranchito de Lugo near what is now South Gate, California.
