= Asuksa-nga, California =

Asuksa-nga
- Former settlement
- Location in California
- Coordinates: 34°08′01″N 117°54′27″W
- Country: United States
- State: California
- County: Los Angeles County
- City: Azusa
- Elevation: 610 ft (186 m)

Asuksa-nga (also Azucsagna or Asucsagna, or Ashuksha-vit in the neighboring Serrano dialect of Shoshone) was a former Tongva-Gabrieleño Californian Native American settlement in the San Gabriel Valley. The name means "Skunk place" or "Skunk hill," with Asuksa meaning skunk and the locative suffix -nga or -vit meaning place. The settlement was located in Los Angeles County, California.

It was located where the San Gabriel River exits the San Gabriel Mountains, in present-day Azusa and Duarte.

== See also ==
- Tongva populated places
- California mission clash of cultures
- Indigenous peoples of California
