= Antonio Cruzado =

Spanish Franciscan missionary (1725–1804)

Father Antonio Cruzado (1725 - October 12, 1804) was a Franciscan missionary in California.

He was born in Alcaracejos and received his religious training in Córdoba, Spain. After serving in Mexico for two decades he was sent to California in 1772. There he was at Mission San Gabriel Arcángel until his death at age 79. He is buried at the Mission San Gabriel Arcángel.

Father Antonio Cruzado is credited with planting California's first orange grove in 1804.
