= Toviscanga =

Former Tongva village located at Mission San Gabriel

Coordinates: 34.0977°N 118.1068°W

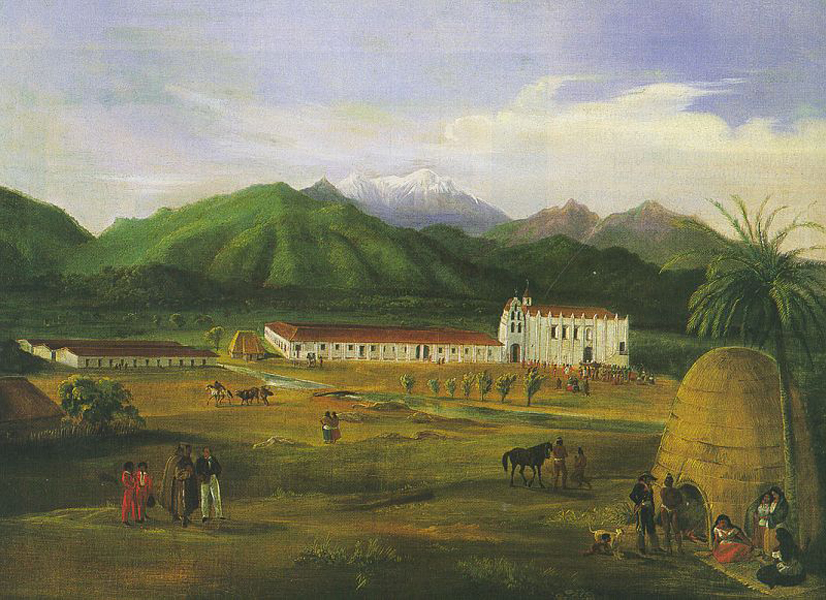
A painting of Mission San Gabriel from 1832, showing Tongva dwellings near the mission.

Toviscanga was a former Tongva village now located at Mission San Gabriel Arcángel in San Gabriel, California. Alternative spellings for the village include Tobiscanga. The name of Tuvasak was the Payómkawichum name for the village. The village was closely situated to the village of Sibagna.

In 1771, the original site of Mission San Gabriel was constructed near the village. However, a flash flood destroyed this building, which caused the Spanish missionaries to relocate it to the village of Toviscanga in 1776. This was similar to how Mission San Juan Capistrano was built less than sixty yards from the village of Acjacheme in 1776.

The village location as being at Mission San Gabriel was referenced by Junipero Serra as the site of the mission, as reflected in a title he gave for his book of confirmations in 1778: "Este Mision del Santo Principe el Arcángel San Gabriel de los Temblores alias Toviscanga."

Residents of the village spoke a specific dialect of the Tongva language, referred to in records as the San Gabriel dialect. In 1875, two older men reportedly spoke the dialect. In 1882, the dialect was written to be nearly extinct. A Franciscan missionary Jose Maria Zalvadeas reportedly gave a sermon and translated Christian prayers in the language to convert the villagers. In 1824, he reportedly had written grammatical rules for the language in a dictionary. However, in 1882, the whereabouts of this document were declared unknown.

== See also ==
- Achooykomenga (the site of Mission San Fernando)
- Acjacheme (the site of Mission San Juan Capistrano)
- Yaanga (the site of Pueblo de Los Ángeles)
- Category: Tongva populated places
  - Tongva language
- Spanish missions in California
  - California mission clash of cultures
