= California mission clash of cultures =

Consequences of Spanish occupation to the indigenous cultures and populations

The California mission clash of cultures occurred at the Spanish Missions in California during the Spanish Las Californias-New Spain and Mexican Alta California eras of control, with lasting consequences after American statehood. The Missions were militarily protected religious outposts and settlements established by Spanish Catholic Franciscans from 1769 to 1823. Their purpose was to assert Spain's colonial claims in California and defend the colony against other European imperial powers through settlements, profitable export enterprises, and the conversion of the Californian Native Americans to Roman Catholicism.

The Spanish occupation of California brought some negative consequences to the Native American cultures and populations, both those the missionaries were in contact with and others that were traditional trading partners. These aspects have received more research in recent decades.

== Spanish era history ==
One of the tasks assigned to early Spanish explorers of California was to report on the native peoples found there. The Portolá expedition of 1769-70 was the first European land exploration, reaching as far north as San Francisco Bay. Several members of the expedition kept diaries that, among other things, described interactions with and observations about the natives. The most detailed of these diaries was by Franciscan missionary Juan Crespí. A report written later by Pedro Fages, one of the expedition's military officers, was also influential.

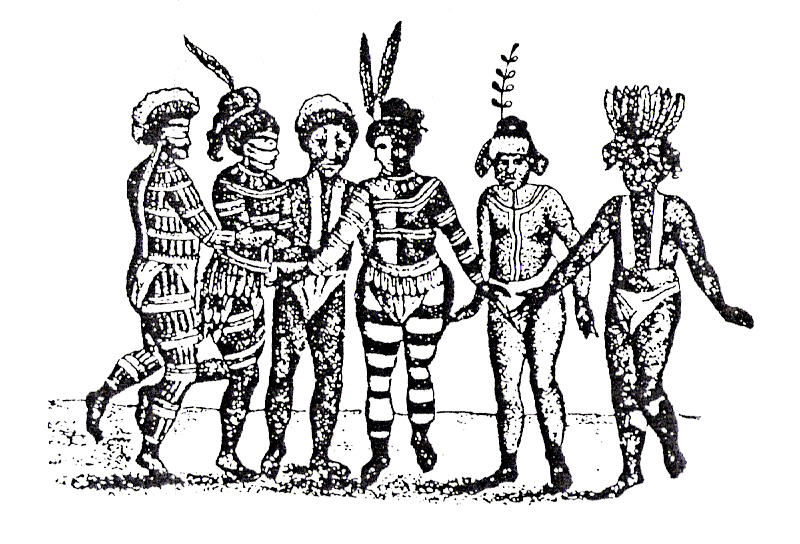
Georg von Langsdorff, early visitor to California, sketched a group of Ohlone-Costeño dancers at Mission San José in 1806. "The hair of these people is very coarse, thick, and stands erect; in some it is powdered with down feathers," Langsdorff noted. "Their bodies are fantastically painted with charcoal dust, red clay, and chalk. The foremost dancer is ornamented all over with down feathers, which gives him a monkey-like appearance; the hindermost has had the whimsical idea of painting his body to imitate the uniform of a Spanish soldier, with his boots, stockings, breeches, and upper garments."

Before the padres could abandon their interim missions and begin work on more permanent structures, they had to first attract and convert a sufficiently large number of local Indians, who would comprise the major portion of their work force. The priests offered beads, clothing, blankets, even food to the "gentiles" to attract them to the prospects of mission life and convince them to move into the mission compound or a nearby village. Each Indian was expected to contribute a certain number of hours' labor each week towards making adobes or roof tiles, working on construction crews, performing some type of handicraft, or farming. Women wove cloth, prepared meals, washed clothes, and were generally responsible for whatever domestic chores arose at the mission.

The hierarchy of power in missions was a major cause of culture clash between Franciscan missionaries and Native Americans. Missionaries devolved authority to Native American officials who often held power within their own tribes, but this authority clashed with their own cultural values. Social organization in precontact California is scarcely recorded, but a ruling elite presided over commoners and an underclass, determined by lineage and cultural inheritance. Conversely, mission power structure was determined by elections, eliminating traditional Native American social hierarchy and replacing it with a system heavily monitored and often controlled by Franciscans.

Native American officials were often tasked with keeping the peace between missionaries and Native American inhabitants, leading to increased friction between officials and their unelected counterparts. Regarding the duty of officials, Junípero Serra wrote in a letter to his trusted subordinate Fermín Lasuén: "Ask him to carry out this function so that, without failing in the slightest degree in his duty toward his superior officer, the Indians may not be given a less exalted opinion of the fathers than they have had until now."

In 1811, the Spanish Viceroy in Mexico sent an interrogatorio (questionnaire) to all missions in Alta California regarding the customs, disposition, and condition of the Mission Indians. The replies, which varied greatly in length, spirit, and even value of information, were collected and prefaced by the Father-Presidente with a short general statement or abstract. He sent the compilation to the viceregal government. The contemporary nature of the responses, no matter how incomplete or biased some may be, are nonetheless of considerable value to modern ethnologists. The Indians also spent much of their days learning the Christian faith, and attended worship services several times a day (Fray Gerónimo Boscana, a Franciscan scholar who was stationed at Mission San Juan Capistrano for more than a decade beginning in 1812, compiled what is widely considered to be the most comprehensive study of prehistoric religious practices in the San Juan Capistrano valley).

== Mexican era history ==
When Spain lost control of Las Californias and all of New Spain, due to the Mexican War of Independence succeeding, it left primarily Spanish Franciscan missionaries, suspect by the new Mexican government, managing the mission building complexes in the new Alta California. The Mexican secularization act of 1833 ended the mission system. Much of the prime agricultural lands had Californios with Spanish land grants who remained, who tended to utilize the Indian peoples as a form of enslaved labor. The Mexican land grant period formed many more ranchos in California from mission and Native American lands.

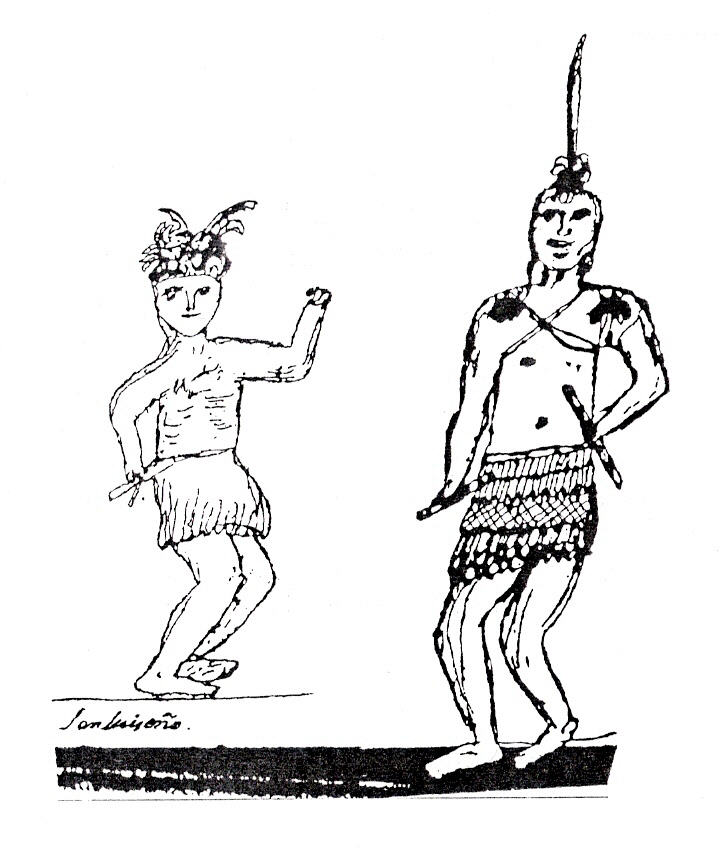
Pablo Tac, who lived at Mission San Luis Rey in the 1820s and 1830s, penned this drawing depicting two young men wearing skirts of twine and feathers with feather decorations on their heads, rattles in their hands, and (perhaps) painted decorations on their bodies.

== Contemporary research ==
In recent years, much debate has arisen as to the actual treatment of the Indians during the Mission Period, and Native American scholars claim that the California Mission system is directly responsible for the decline of the Native American populations. For many years, it was commonly taught that the Indians enjoyed their new lives, and that many were able to sustain themselves after the fall of the mission system by utilizing the skills they had acquired at the missions. The Indians were purportedly often granted leave to visit their villages and participated in many ceremonies and celebrations throughout the year at the urging of their benefactors. Modern anthropologists cite a cultural bias on the part of the missionaries that prejudiced them against indigenous cultures and caused them to develop strongly condescending and colonial opinions about the rights and dignity of Californian Native Americans.

Evidence has now been brought to light that puts the Californian Native Americans' experiences in a very different context. For instance, women were quartered separately from the men, regardless of marital status. In addition, Native American cultural and spiritual beliefs about marriage, love, and sex were routinely disrespected or punished. Once an Indian agreed to become part of the mission community, he or she was forbidden to leave it without a padre's permission, and from then on led a fairly regimented life learning "civilized" ways from the Spaniards. Indians were often subjected to corporal punishment and other discipline as determined by the padres.

The canonization of Junípero Serra continues to spark contemporary debate regarding the treatment of Native Americans at the hands of Franciscan missionaries. In reaction to Pope Francis's announcement that he would canonize Serra in January 2015 was, a statue of Christ in a cemetery at Mission San Gabriel in Los Angeles was toppled, and a MoveOn petition to "enlighten" the pope regarding “the deception, exploitation, oppression, enslavement, and genocide” of Native Americans received over 10,000 signatures.

== Population ==
The pre-contact population of California (225,000) had been reduced by 33 percent during Spanish and Mexican rule, but that was caused mostly by epidemics. Under American rule (from 1848 on), when most of the twenty-one missions were in ruins, the loss of indigenous lives was catastrophic—80 percent died, leaving just 30,000 in 1870. And nearly half of those losses were due not to disease, but to murder. Baja California experienced a similar reduction in native population resulting from Spanish colonization efforts there.

== See also ==
- Pueblo Revolt
- Mission Indians
- Spanish colonization of the Americas
- Ranchos of California
- History of Christian Missions
- Genízaros
- Bibliography of California history

== Notes ==
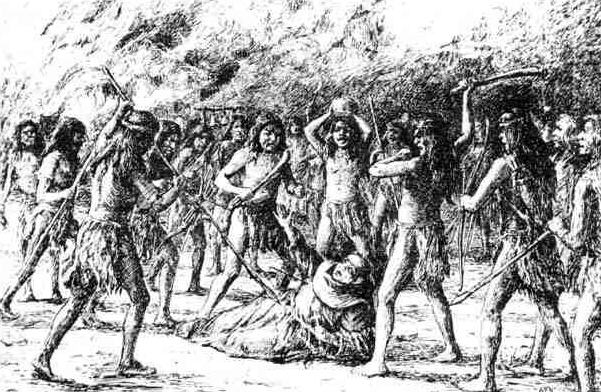
An illustration depicts the brutal death of Father Luís Jayme by the hands of angry natives at Mission San Diego de Alcalá, November 4, 1775. The uprising was the first of a dozen similar incidents that took place in Alta California during the Mission Period; however, most rebellions tended to be localized and short-lived due to the Spaniards' superior weaponry (native resistance more often took the form of non-cooperation, desertion, and raids on mission livestock).

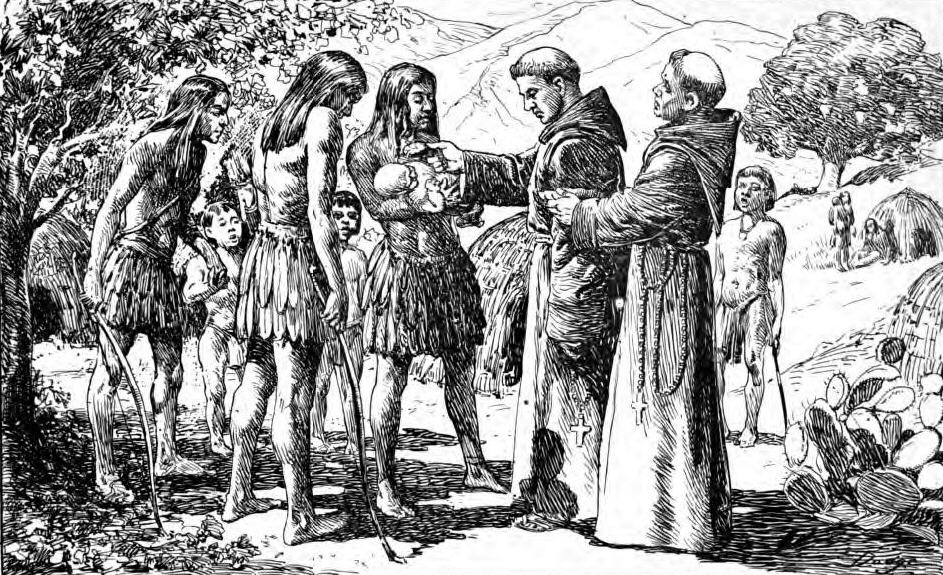
The first recorded baptisms in Alta California were performed on July 22, 1769, in "The Canyon of the Little Christians" in what today is southern California

.
