= Pablo de la Portillà =

Pablo de la Portilla

Commandant of the Presidio of San Diego
- In office 1835–1838
- Preceded by: Santiago Arguello
- Succeeded by: Juan María Marrón

Personal details
- Profession: Soldier, commissioner

Military service
- Allegiance: Mexico
- Rank: Captain
- Battles/wars: Chumash Revolt of 1824, Kumeyaay campaigns

Pablo de la Portilla was a soldier and pioneer in nineteenth-century California.

== Biography ==
Capt. Portilla served in the frontier Spanish army. He arrived in 1819 with his troops on the Cossack from Mazatlán, Mexico. These were reinforcements to protect Mission San Buenaventura against Mohave (Colorado River) Indians. They were attached to the Presidio of Santa Barbara.

Capt. Portilla took part in the 1831 Mexican Revolution.

Capt. Portilla was nominally Commandant of the Presidio of San Diego whenever he was present there, during the years 1835–1838, although he was not stationed there. He was there during campaigns of varying success to protect against Kumeyaay Indian attacks. He also led a punitive expedition against the Chumash Revolt in Santa Barbara in 1824, traveling to the southern San Joaquin Valley.

For his efforts Mission San Luis Rey de Francia, when secularized by the Mexican Government in 1834, was turned over to Portilla, along with future Governor Pío Pico. Father Buenaventura Fortuna surrendered Mission San Luis Rey and all its holdings, including Las Flores Estancia and the San Antonio de Pala Asistencia, to government comisianados (commissioners) Pío Pico and Portilla on August 22, 1835; the assessed value of "Rancho de Pala" was $15,363.25. The secularization occurred after Mexico won independence from Spain. The land was supposed to be returned to the natives, but most of it went to Mexican officials and their friends.

== See also ==
- Spanish colonization of the Americas
