= Mission San Luis Rey de Francia =

18th-century Spanish mission in California

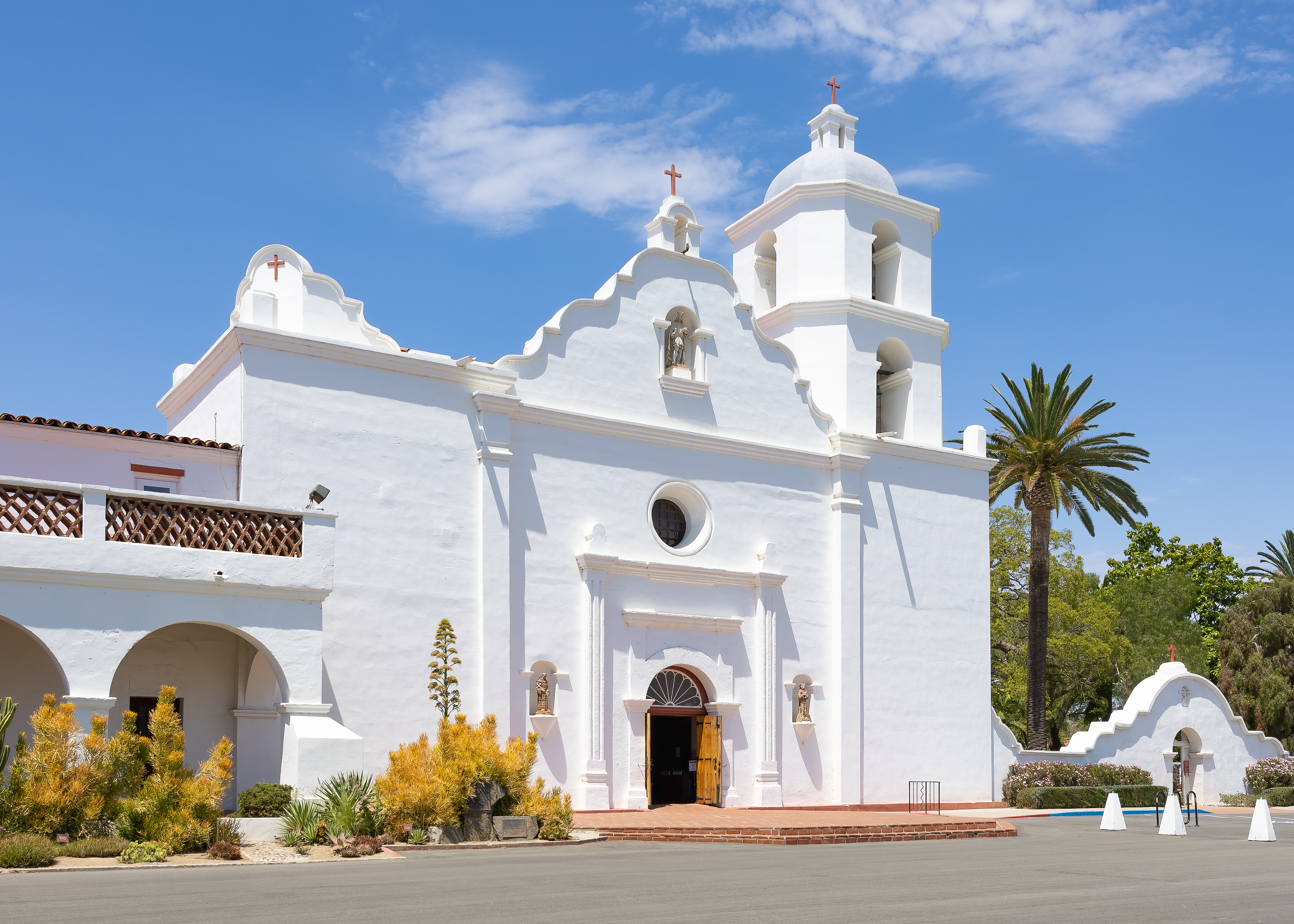
- Mission San Luis Rey de Francia in July 2022

- Location within California
- Location: 4050 Mission Ave. Oceanside, California 92057 US
- Coordinates: 33°13′57″N 117°19′13″W
- Name as founded: La Misión de San Luis, Rey de Francia
- English translation: The Mission of Saint Louis, King of France
- Patron: Louis IX of France
- Nickname: "King of the Missions"
- Founded: June 13, 1798
- Founded by: Father Fermín de Lasuén
- Area: 35 acres (14 ha)
- Built: 1815
- Architectural style: Spanish Colonial
- Founding Order: Eighteenth
- Military district: First (El Presidio Reál de San Diego)
- Native tribe: Kumeyaay, Quechnajuichom; Luiseño & Diegueño 'Mission Indians'
- Native place name: Quencha—Quechla
- Baptisms: 5,399
- Marriages: 1,335
- Burials: 2,718
- Neophyte population: 2,788
- Secularized: 1834
- Returned to the Church: 1865
- Governing body: Roman Catholic Diocese of San Diego
- Current use: Parish/Museum/Cemetery/Retreat House

U.S. National Register of Historic Places
- Official name: San Luis Rey Mission Church
- Designated: April 15, 1970
- Reference no.: 70000142

U.S. National Historic Landmark
- Designated: April 15, 1970

California Historical Landmark
- Reference no.: #239

Website
- http://www.sanluisrey.org/

Mission San Luis Rey de Francia (Spanish: Misión San Luis Rey de Francia) is a former Spanish mission in San Luis Rey, a neighborhood in Oceanside, California. This Mission lent its name to the Luiseño tribe of Mission Indians.

At its prime, Mission San Luis Rey's structures and services compound covered almost 950,400 acres (384,600 ha), making it the largest of the Californian missions, along with its surrounding agricultural land. Multiple outposts were built in support of Mission San Luis Rey and placed under its supervision, including the San Antonio de Pala Asistencia in 1816 and the Las Flores Estancia in 1823.

== Spanish era ==
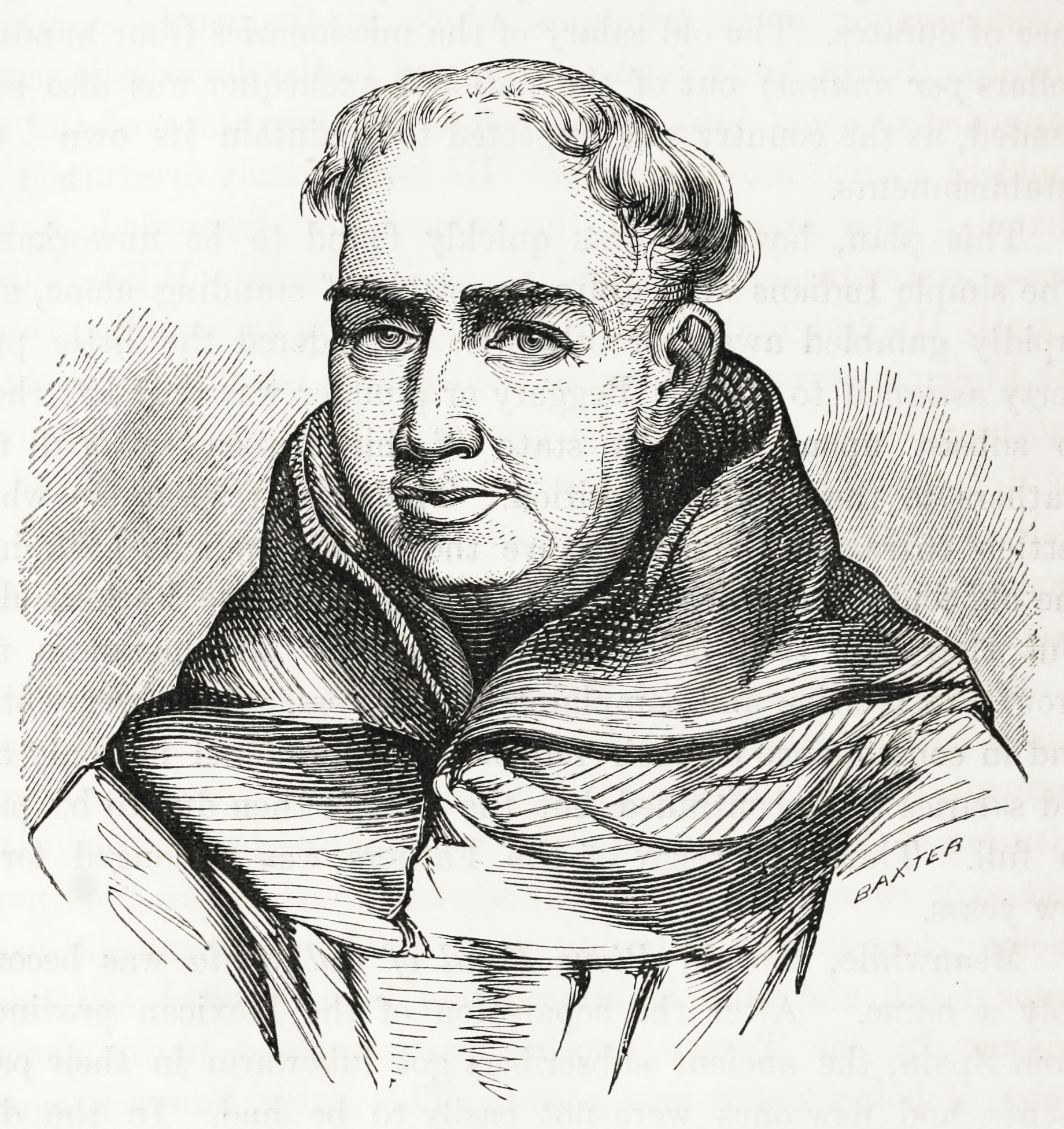
Antonio Peyrí was the padre in charge of Mission San Luis Rey from 1799 to 1833.

The full name of the mission is La Misión de San Luis, Rey de Francia (The Mission of Saint Louis, King of France). It was named for King Louis IX of France. Its nickname is "King of the Missions". It was founded by padre Fermín Lasuén on June 12, 1798, the eighteenth of the twenty-one Spanish missions built in the Alta California Province of the Viceroyalty of New Spain. In 1800, Mission olive trees were first planted at the Mission; by 1876, only seven of the mission's olive trees were alive.

The current church, built in 1815, is the third church on this location. It is a National Historic Landmark, for its pristine example of a Spanish mission church complex. Today the mission complex functions as a parish church of the Diocese of San Diego as well as a museum and retreat center. Mission San Luis Rey De Francia raised about 26,000 cattle as well as goats, geese, and pigs.

An early account of life at the Mission was written by one of its Native American converts, Luiseño Pablo Tac, in his work Indian Life and Customs at Mission San Luis Rey: A Record of California Mission Life by Pablo Tac, An Indian Neophyte (written c. 1835 in Rome, later edited and translated in 1958 by Minna Hewes and Gordon Hewes). In his book, Tac lamented the rapid population decline of his Luiseño people after the founding of the mission:

In Quechla not long ago there were 5,000 souls, with all their neighboring lands. Through a sickness that came to California, 2,000 souls died, and 3,000 were left.

The Mission-born, Franciscan-educated Tac wrote that his people initially attempted to bar the Spaniards from invading their Southern California lands. Pablo Tac went on to describe the preferential conditions and treatment the padres received:

In the mission of San Luis Rey de Francia the Fernandino [sic] father is like a king. He has his pages, alcaldes, majordomos, musicians, soldiers, gardens, ranchos, livestock....

== Mexican era ==
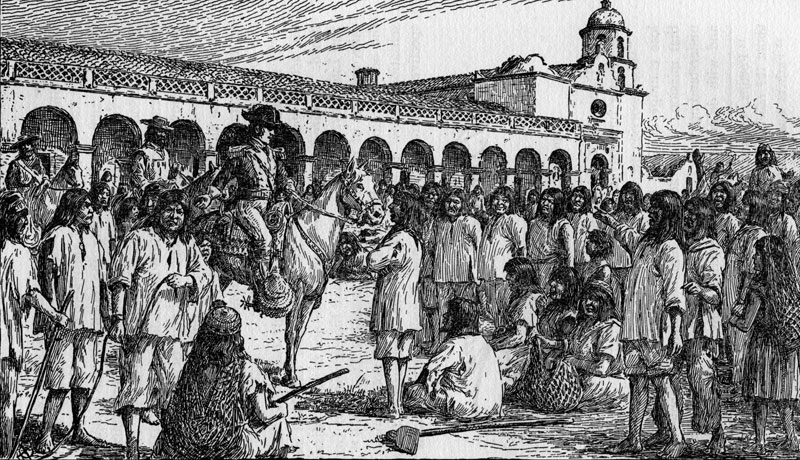
Luiseños refusing to work for Captain Pablo de la Portillà in 1835.

The first Peruvian Pepper Tree (Schinus molle) in California was planted here in 1830, now iconic, widely planted, and renamed the California Pepper tree in the state. After the Mexican secularization act of 1833 much of Mission San Luis Rey de Francia land was sold off. Indigenous peoples, previously forced to work on missions, were freed from direct subjugation in the mission system through this act. When Native people at San Luis Rey learned of their impending freedom, they proclaimed together: "We are free! We do not want to obey! We do not want to work!" and left the mission by the thousands, returning to their rural communities "which in some cases their forebears had left two generations earlier."

During the Mexican–American War in Alta California (1846–1847), the Mission was utilized as a military outpost by the United States Army. In July 1847, U.S. military governor of California Richard Barnes Mason created an Indian sub-agency at Mission San Luis Rey, and his men took charge of the mission property in August, appointing Jesse Hunter from the recently arrived Mormon Battalion as sub-agent. Battalion guide Jean Baptiste Charbonneau, the Native American Shoshone child of Sacagawea who had traveled with the Lewis and Clark Expedition forty years earlier, was appointed by Mason as the Alcalde "within the District of San Diego, at or near San Luis Rey" in November 1847. Charbonneau resigned from the post in August, 1848, claiming that "because of his Indian heritage others thought him biased when problems arose between the Indians and the other inhabitants of the district."

== American era ==
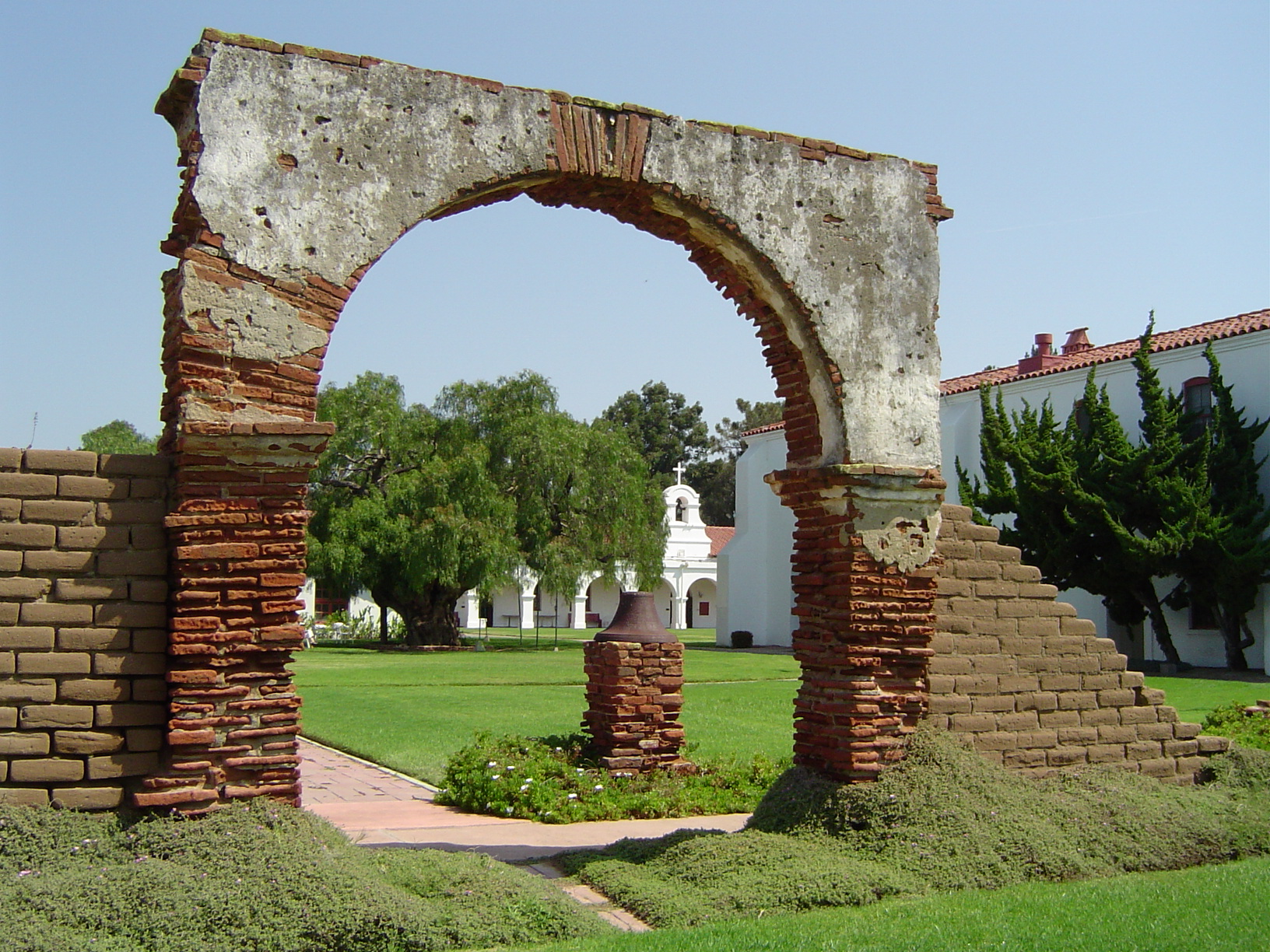
The courtyard of Mission San Luis Rey de Francia, with the first Peruvian Pepper Tree (Schinus molle) planted in California in 1830, visible behind the arch.

With secularization of the mission in 1834, no religious services were held and the Luiseño were left behind by the fleeing Franciscan padres. The Mission's religious services restarted in 1893, when two Mexican priests were given permission to restore the Mission as a Franciscan college. Father Joseph O'Keefe was assigned as an interpreter for the monks. It was he who began to restore the old Mission in 1895. The cuadrángulo (quadrangle) and church were completed in 1905. San Luis Rey College was opened as a seminary in 1950, but closed in 1969.

Episodes 2, 3, 4 and 12 of the Disney-produced Zorro TV series include scenes filmed in 1957 at San Luis Rey, which doubled for the Mission of San Gabriel. Disney added a skull and crossbones to the cemetery entrance.

In 1998, Gilbert Levine led members of the Los Angeles Philharmonic and, with the special permission of Pope John Paul II, the ancient Cappella Giulia Choir of St. Peter's Basilica, the first-ever visit of this 500-year-old choir to the Western Hemisphere, in a series of concerts to commemorate the 200th anniversary of the founding of the mission, broadcast on NPR's Performance Today. In February 2013, the seismic retrofitting was completed.

Today, Mission San Luis Rey de Francia is a working mission, cared for by the people who belong to the parish, with ongoing restoration projects. Mission San Luis Rey has a Museum, Visitors' Center, Retreat Center, gardens with the historic Pepper Tree, and the original small cemetery.

== See also ==
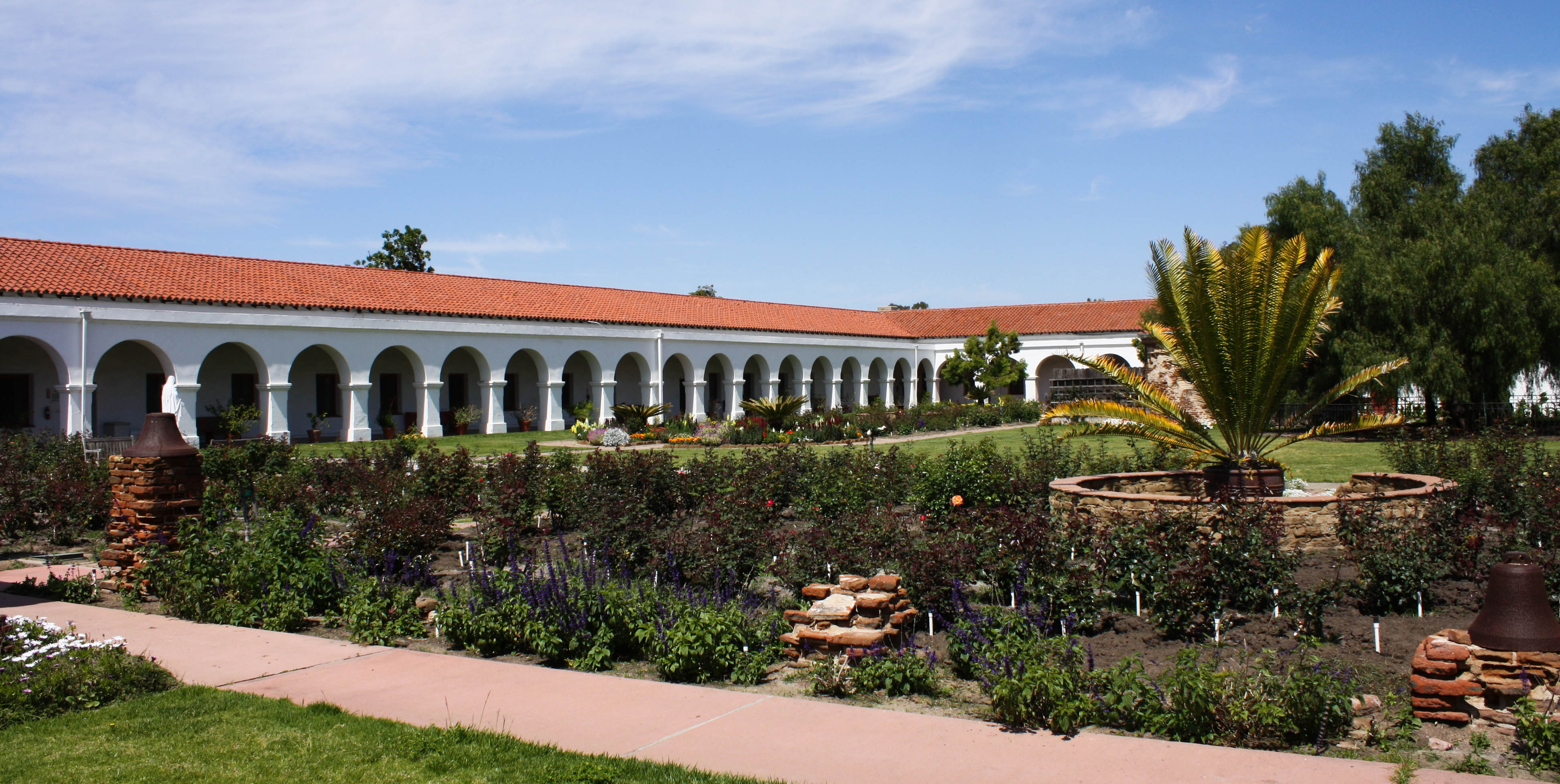
The courtyard of the mission

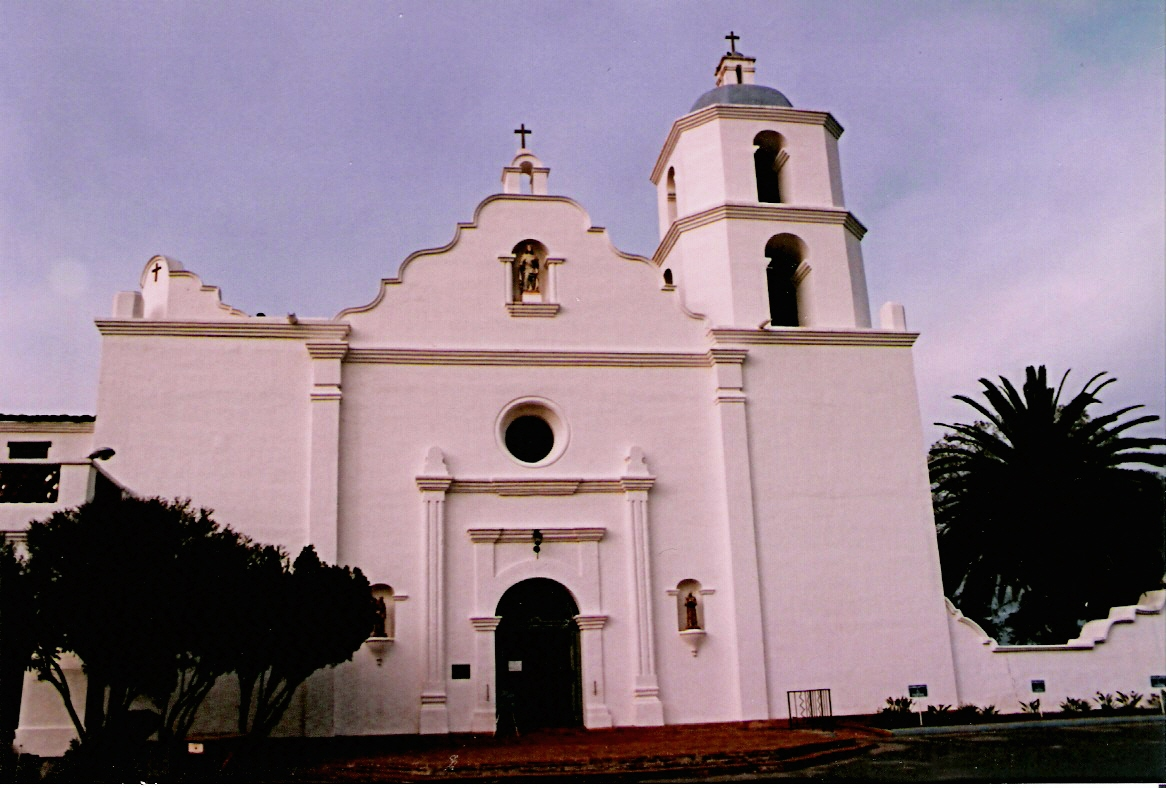
Mission San Luis Rey de Francia as it appeared in 1986. In 1841, French explorer Eugene Duflot de Mofras produced a sketch of the Mission that depicted a second belfry, thereby supporting the theory that two bell towers were planned, but never completed; the lone tower was also used as a lookout post.

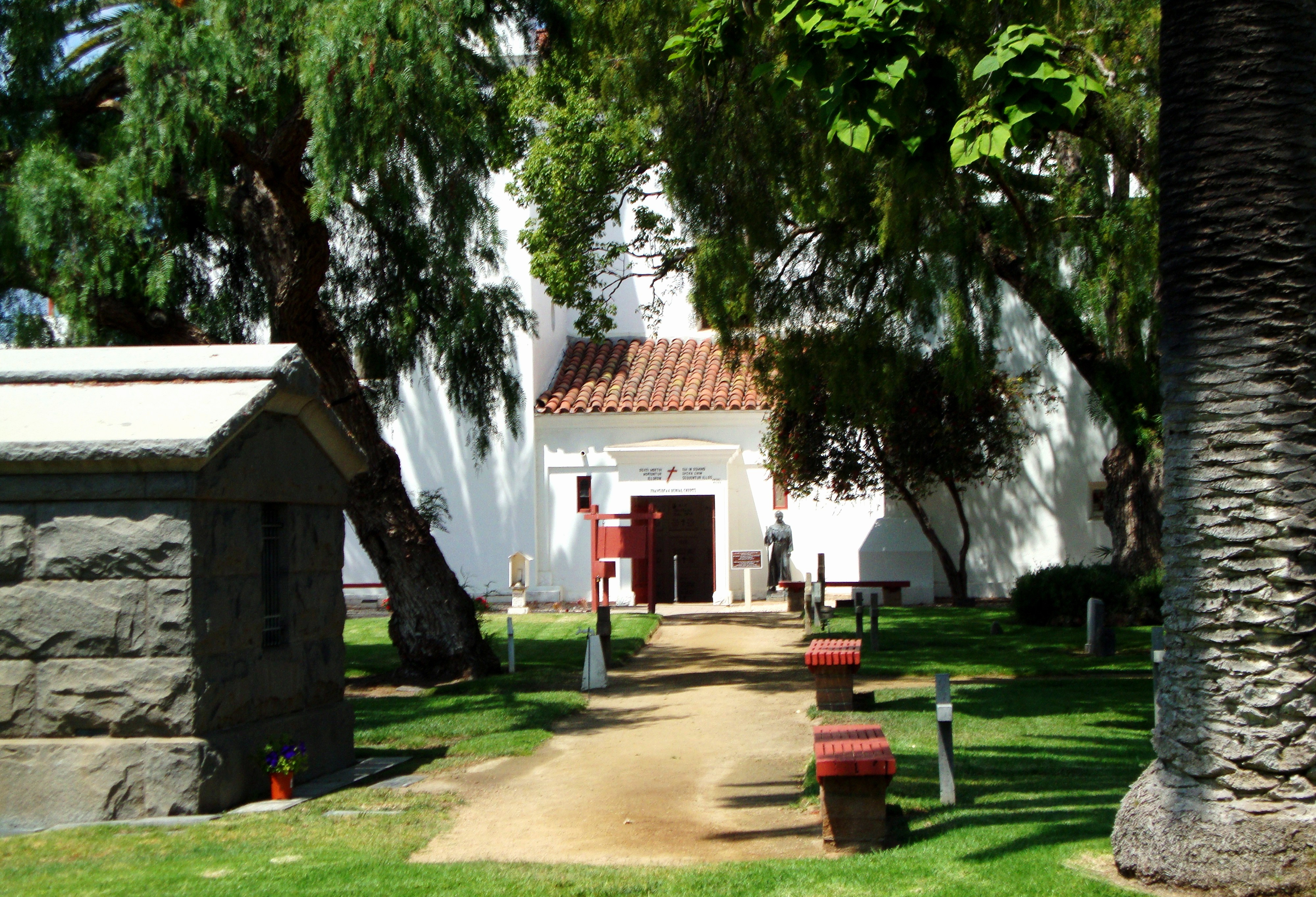
Old Cemetery - founded in 1798

- Spanish missions in California
- List of Spanish missions in California
- Las Flores Asistencia
- Mission San Antonio de Pala
- Luiseño – Mission Indians
- Population of Native California
- California mission clash of cultures
- USNS Mission San Luis Rey (AO-128) – a Buenaventura Class fleet oiler launched during World War II.
