= San Antonio de Pala Asistencia =

19th-century Spanish asistencia in California

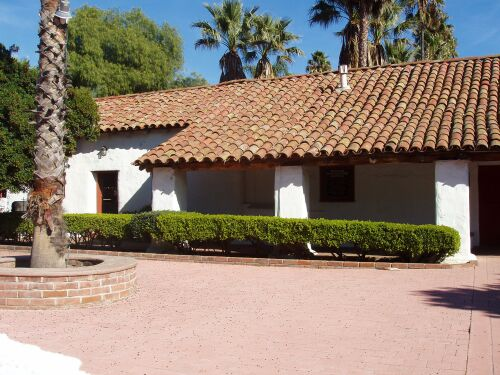
- The modern capilla (chapel) at "Pala Mission."

- Location within California
- Location: San Diego County
- Coordinates: 33°21′40″N 117°4′45″W
- Name as founded: Asistencia de la Misión San Luis, Rey de Francia
- English translation: Sub-Mission to the Mission San Luis Rey de Francia
- Patron: Saint Anthony of Lisbon, Portugal and Padova, Italy
- Founded: June 13, 1816
- Founded by: Father Antonio Peyrí
- Military district: First
- Native tribe: Payomkowishum; Luiseño
- Native place name: Pale
- Governing body: Roman Catholic Diocese of San Diego
- Current use: Parish Church / Museum

California Historical Landmark
- Reference no.: #243

Website
- https://missionsanantoniodepala.org/

The San Antonio de Pala Asistencia, or the Pala Mission, was founded on June 13, 1816, as an asistencia or "sub-mission" to Mission San Luis Rey de Francia, some twenty miles inland upstream from the latter mission on the San Luis Rey River. Pala Mission was part of the Spanish missions, asistencias, and estancias system in Las Californias—Alta California. Today it is located in the Pala Indian Reservation located in northern San Diego County, with the official name of Mission San Antonio de Pala. It is the only historic mission facility still serving a Mission Indian tribe. The complex was listed on the National Register of Historic Places in 2026.

Pala (a derivation of the native term Pale, meaning water) was essentially a small rancho surrounded by large fields and herds. The Pala site had been noted by Father Juan Mariner and Captain Juan Pablo Grijalva on an exploratory trip in 1795, when they went up the San Diego River, and then through Sycamore Canyon to the Santa Maria Valley (or Pamó Valley) and into what they named El Valle de San José, now known as Warner Springs. Once Mission San Luis Rey began to prosper, it attracted the attention of numerous mountain Native Americans in the area, who were called the Luiseño by the Spanish.

== Spanish era ==
The Franciscan fathers chose this site for the Pala Mission because it was a traditional gathering place and village for the Native American residents. Father Peyrí oversaw the addition of a chapel and housing to the granary complex, which was constructed at the spot in 1810. The chapel's interior wall surfaces featured paintings by native artists, originally measuring 144 by 27 feet. Workers went into the Palomar Mountains and cut down cedar trees to use as roof beams.

Pala is unique among all of the Franciscan missions in that it boasts the only completely freestanding campanile, or "bell tower," in all of Alta California. By 1820, some 1,300 baptisms had been performed at the outpost. Folk tales about the mission include mention of a prickly pear cactus, which became a local symbol of Christian victory, that grew up at the foot of the cross.

== Mexican era ==
After the nation achieved independence from Spain, the Mexican Congress passed An Act for the Secularization of the Missions of California on August 17, 1833 (the act was ratified in 1834). Father Buenaventura Fortuna surrendered Mission San Luis Rey and all its holdings, including Las Flores Estancia and the Pala Asistencia, to government comisianados (commissioners) Pío Pico and Pablo de la Portillà on August 22, 1835; the assessed value of "Rancho de Pala" was $15,363.25.

More than a decade later, fearful of the impending conquest of Alta California by the United States as a result of the Mexican–American War, Pico sold off all of the holdings (including Pala) to Antonio J. Cot and José A. Pico on May 18, 1846, for $2,000 in silver and $437.50 in wheat (the sale was later declared invalid by the U.S. Government). Through the years, priests from San Luis Rey continued to visit Pala and conduct baptisms, marriages, and worship services.

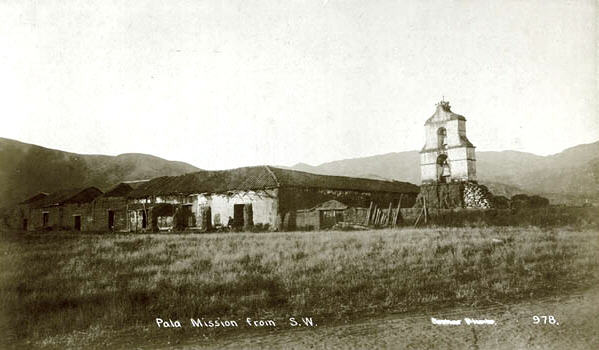
Pala Asistencia, with its original bell tower, circa 1875. The structure is loosely styled after a similar one at the Mission of Nuestra Señora de Guadalupe located in Juárez, Mexico.

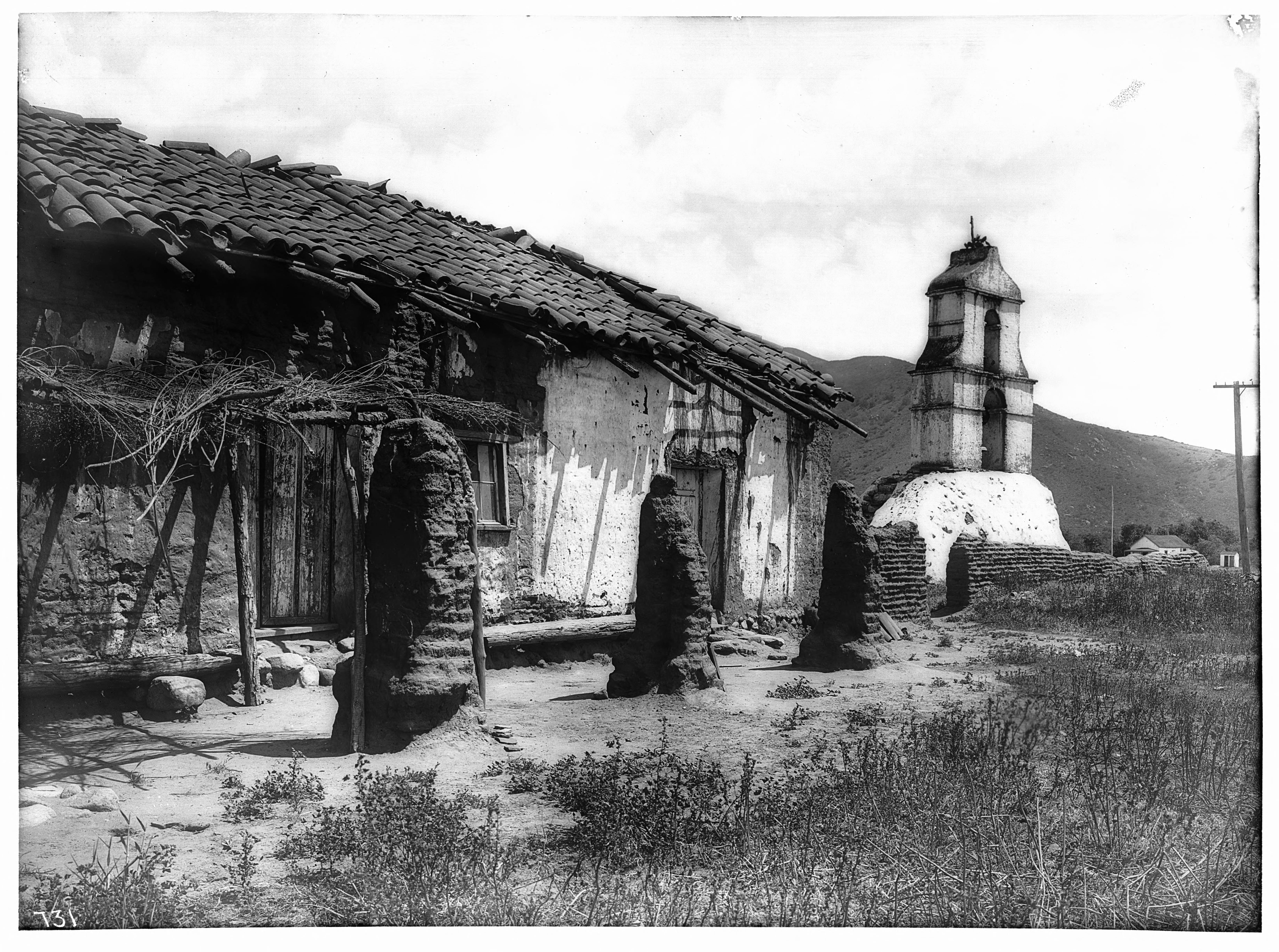
Pala Mission around 1903, falling into ruins

== Modern era ==
On Christmas Day 1899, the San Jacinto earthquake shook the Pala Valley, causing the roof over the church sanctuary to collapse. In 1902, a group named the "Landmarks Club of Southern California", under the direction of American journalist, historian, and photographer Charles Fletcher Lummis, purchased Pala Mission. The following year, the Club returned ownership to the Catholic Church and "saved the Chapel and a few rooms from complete ruin with a timely work of partial restoration."

Pala is the only California mission to have ministered without interruption to the Mission Indians for whom it was originally built. It is also the only sub-mission (Asistencia) still intact. The traditional Corpus Christi Fiesta has been celebrated every year since its founding. Though it lacked a resident priest, Pala served as the "mother" mission to chapels in Cahuilla, La Jolla, Pauma, Pichanga, Rincon, Santa Rosa, and Temecula.

On August 9, 1942 MGM motion picture actress Ruth Hussey was wed at Pala Mission. In 1948 the Verona Fathers (Sons of the Sacred Heart) succeeded the Franciscans in the care of the Mission. Six years later, the fathers undertook a complete restoration of the Mission. In May 1991, administration of the Mission reverted to the Roman Catholic Diocese of San Diego; since June 1996 the Barnabite Fathers have held charge over the Mission's affairs.

Since 1996, Pala has hosted the Vivian Banks charter school (Kindergarten - 5th grade).

== Mission bells ==
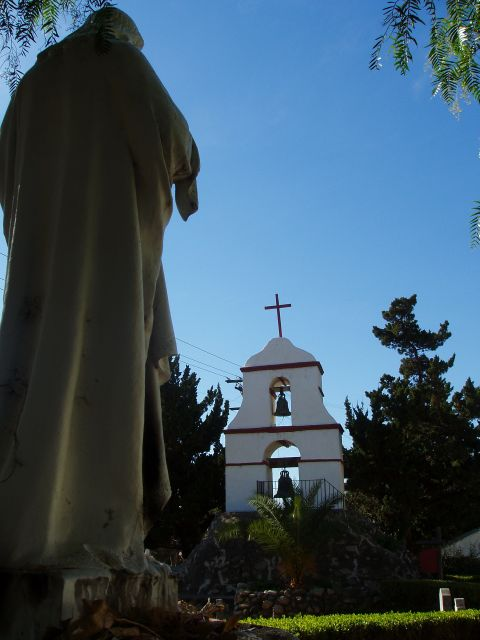
Pala's replica bell tower.

Bells were vitally important to daily life at any mission. The bells were rung at mealtimes, to call the Mission residents to work, religious services, birth and funeral ceremonies, and to signal the approach of a ship or returning Spaniard, and other occasions. Novices were instructed in the specific rituals for ringing the mission bells. Pala's bells are the same ones used since 1916. American academician, architect, and author Rexford Newcomb published design studies of the original bell tower in his 1916 work The Franciscan Mission Architecture of Alta California. The structure was completely destroyed by torrential rains later that same year; a precise replica was erected immediately thereafter and still stands today. The structure measures some 35 feet above the base (which is 15 feet off the ground) and supports two bells, each hanging from a rawhide tether.

The large bell, set in the lower embrasure, bears inscriptions in Latin and Spanish as follows (translated into English):

"Jesus, Redemptor of Mankind [IHR] Holy God, Holy Mighty One, Holy Immortal One, Have Mercy on us. Year of our Lord 1816" (upper band);
"Cervantes made us." (middle band); and
"[In honor of] Our Seraphic Father, Francis of Assisi, San Luis King, Saint Clara, Saint Eulalia, Our Light." (lower band).

The smaller bell, mounted in the upper opening, reads (in Latin):

"Jesus + Maria" (upper band); and
"Santus Deis, Santus Fortus, Santus Immortalis" and "Micerere nobis" (lower band).

== Notes ==
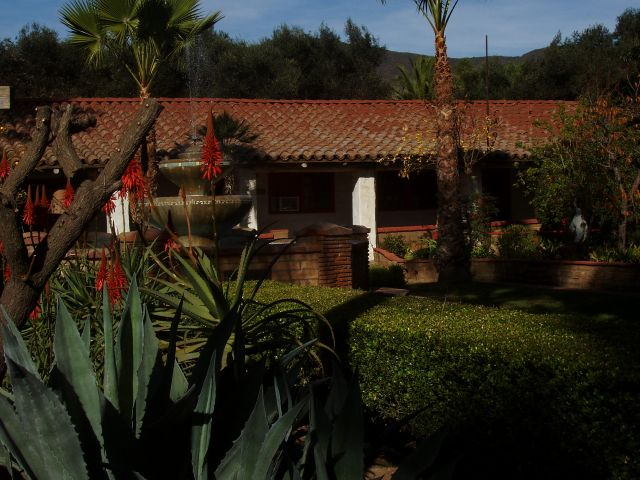
Pala Mission's "Center Garden."

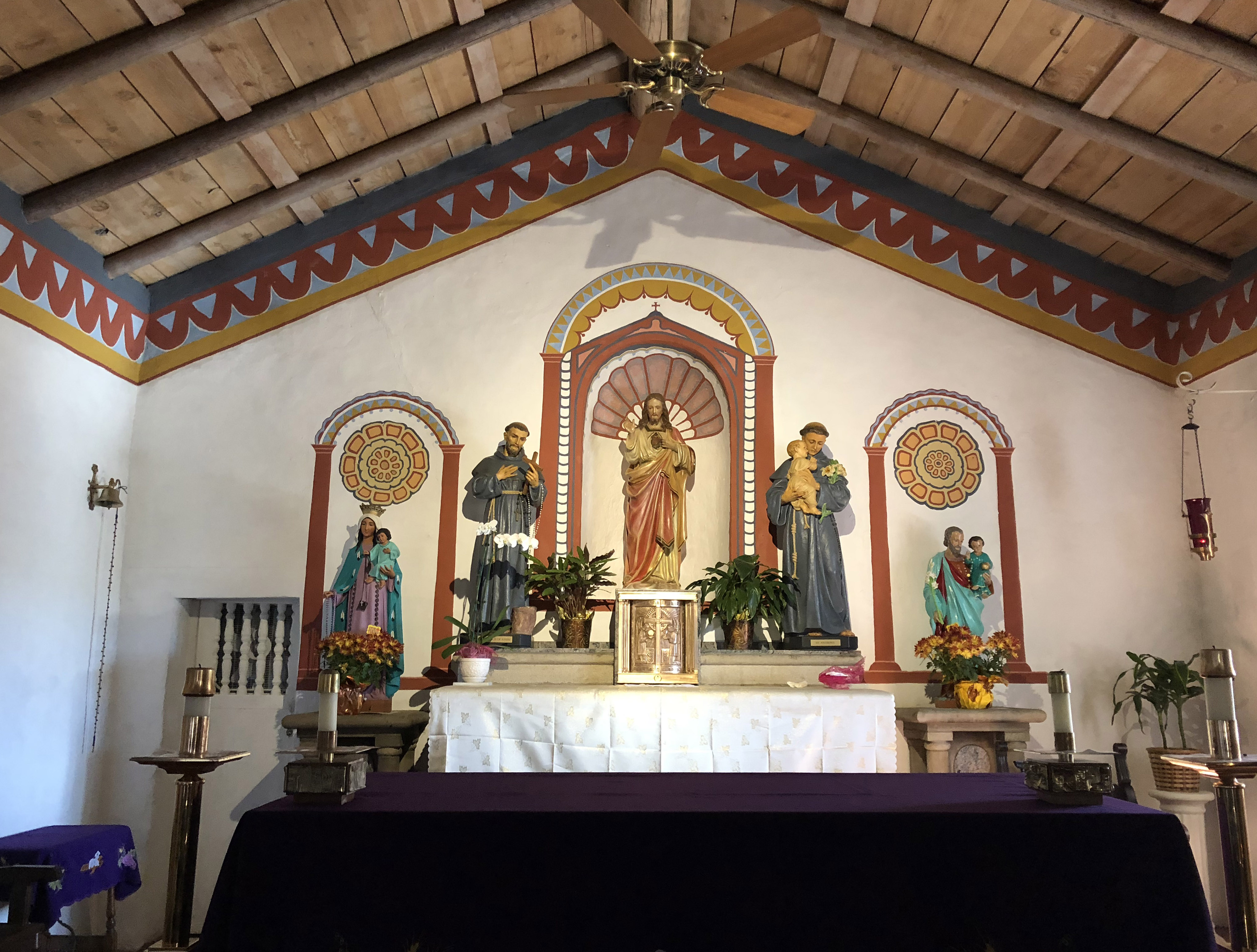
Pala Mission's altar

== See also ==
- List of Spanish missions in California
- Mission San Luis Rey de Francia
- Las Flores Estancia
- Luiseño—Mission Indians
- California mission clash of cultures
- Mission De Pala – a Maritime Commission type T2 tanker built during World War II.
