= Mission Indians =

Indigenous peoples who were forcibly relocated to missions in Southern California

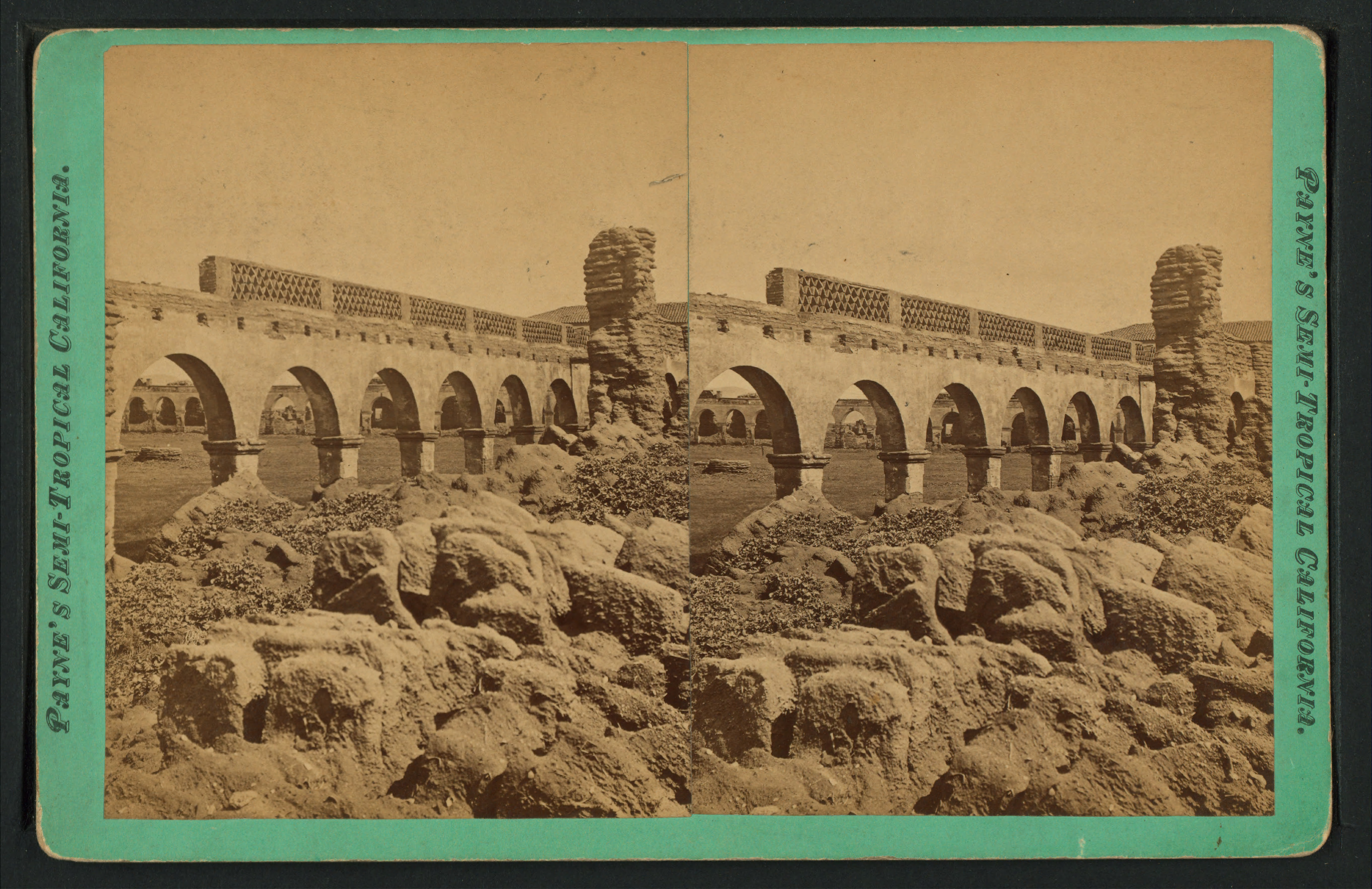
Ruin of the Indian quarters, Mission San Luis Rey

Mission Indians was a term used to refer to the Indigenous peoples of California who lived or grew up in the Spanish mission system in California. Today the term is used to refer to their descendants and to specific, contemporary tribal nations in California.

== History ==
Spanish explorers arrived on California's coasts as early as the mid-16th century. In 1769, the first Spanish Franciscan mission was built in San Diego. Local tribes were relocated and conscripted into forced labor on the mission, stretching from San Diego to San Francisco. Disease, starvation, excessive physical labor, and torture decimated these tribes. Many were baptized as Catholics by the Franciscan missionaries at the missions.

Mission Indians were from many regional Native American tribes; their members were often relocated together in new mixed groups, and the Spanish named the Indian groups after the responsible mission. For instance, the Payomkowishum were renamed Luiseños, after the Mission San Luis Rey; the Acjachemem were renamed the Juaneños, after the Mission San Juan Capistrano and the Tongva, Kizh, or Kisiannos renamed the Gabrieleño, after the Mission San Gabriel.

The Catholic priests forbade the Indians from practicing their native culture, resulting in the disruption of many tribes' linguistic, spiritual, and cultural practices. With no immunity to the exposure of European diseases (as well as sudden cultural upheaval and lifestyle demands), the population of Mission Indians suffered high mortality and dramatic decreases, especially in the coastal regions; the population was reduced by 90 percent, between 1769 and 1848.

Despite the missionaries' attempts to convert the Indigenous peoples of the missions, often referred to in mission records as "neophytes", they indicated that their attempts at conversion were often unsuccessful. Indigenous groups did not passively assimilate into mission life under Spanish authority. Archaeological evidence proposes that Indigenous people maintained and adapted their cultural practices through food preparation and household organization.

Indigenous worldviews and communal structures continued under colonial rule. Native communities reinterpreted newly imposed systems to preserve sacred fundamental components such as kinship networks through spiritual and cultural continuity despite the Catholic restrictions put upon them. Indigenous Californians maintained relationships with kinship networks outside of the mission communities, which continued their cultural knowledge across generations even after mission imposition. Archaeological evidence suggests that previously formed trade networks and political structures further developed despite colonial disruption.

Leaders of Indigenous tribes negotiated their cooperation within colonial institutions with mission padres as a form of resistance. Resistance to the Spanish mission system was represented through overt defiance, strategic disengagement, and refusal to participate in the forced labor needed to maintain the missions. Some Native tribes fled the missions and relocated to mountainous areas unfamiliar to the Spanish as a means to continue their traditional lifestyle. The refusal to adopt the Spanish language and religious practices was another way to resist assimilation.

For example, in 1803, twenty-eight years into the mission period, Friar Fermín de Lasuén wrote:

Generally the neophytes have not yet enough affection for Christianity and civilization. Most of them are excessively fond of the mountains, the beach, and of barbarous freedom and independence, so that some show of military force is necessary, lest they by force of arms deny the Faith and law which they have professed.

Abuse persisted after Mexico assumed control of the California missions in 1834. Mexico secularized the missions and transferred (or sold) the lands to other non-Native administrators or owners. Many of the Mission Indians worked on the newly established ranchos, with little improvement in their living conditions.

Around 1906, Alfred L. Kroeber and Constance G. Du Bois, of the University of California, Berkeley, first applied the term "Mission Indians" to southern California Native Americans, as an ethnographic and anthropological label to include those at Mission San Luis Obispo de Tolosa and south.

== Reservations ==
Mission Indian (Luiseño).

Mission Indian woman (Luiseño).

On January 12, 1891, the US Congress passed the "An Act for the Relief of the Mission Indians in the State of California". This would further sanction the original grants of the Mexican government to the natives in southern California, and sought to protect their rights, while giving railroad corporations a primary interest.

In 1927, the Sacramento Bureau of Indian Affairs Superintendent Lafayette A. Dorrington was instructed by Assistant Commissioner E. B. Merritt, in Washington D.C., to list the tribes in California from whom Congress had not yet purchased land, and for those lands to be used as reservations. As part of the 1928 the California Indian Jurisdictional Act enrollment, Native Americans were asked to identify their "Tribe or Band". The majority of applicants supplied the name of the mission that they knew their ancestors were associated with. The enrollment was part of a plan to provide reservation lands promised, but never fulfilled by 18 non-ratified treaties made in 1851–1852.

Because of the enrollment applications, and the native American's association with a specific geographical location (often associated with the Catholic missions), the bands of natives became known as the "mission band" of people associated with a Spanish mission. Some bands also occupy trust lands—Indian Reservations—identified under the Mission Indian Agency. The Mission Indian Act of 1891 formed the administrative Bureau of Indian Affairs unit which governs San Diego, Riverside, San Bernardino, and Santa Barbara Counties. There is one Chumash reservation in the last county, and more than thirty reservations in the others.

Los Angeles, San Luis Obispo, Ventura and Orange Counties do not contain any tribal trust lands. However, resident organizations that self-identify as Native American tribes, including self-identified Tongva in the first and Acjachemen in the last county (as well as Coastal Chumash in Santa Barbara County) continue seeking federal tribal recognition by the Bureau of Indian Affairs. There are no state-recognized tribes in California.

Eleven of the southern California reservations were included under the early 20th-century allotment programs, which broke up communal tribal holding, to assign property to individual households, with individual heads of household and tribal members identified lists such as the Dawes Rolls.

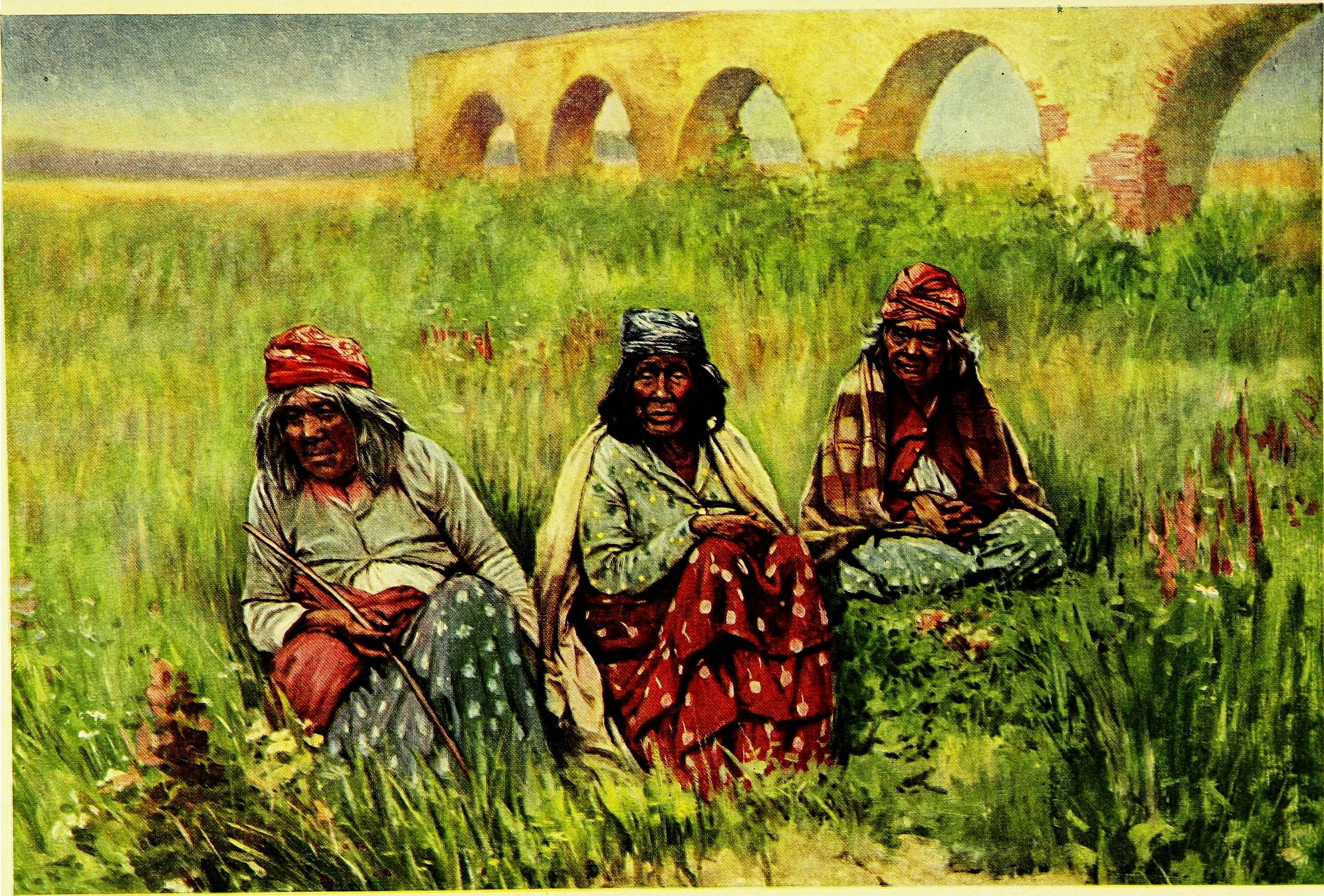
Depiction of three "Indian Crones" from the Mission San Luis Rey de Francia, published in "American Indians: first families of the Southwest" by John Frederick Huckel, in 1920

The most important reservations include: the Agua Caliente Reservation in Palm Springs, which occupies alternate sections (approx. 640 acres each) with former railroad grant lands that form much of the city; the Morongo Reservation in the San Gorgonio Pass area; and the Pala Reservation which includes San Antonio de Pala Asistencia (Pala Mission) of the Mission San Luis Rey de Francia in Pala. These and the tribal governments of fifteen other reservations operate casinos today. The total acreage of the mission group of reservations constitutes approximately 250,000 acres (1,000 km^{2}).

== Southern California locations ==
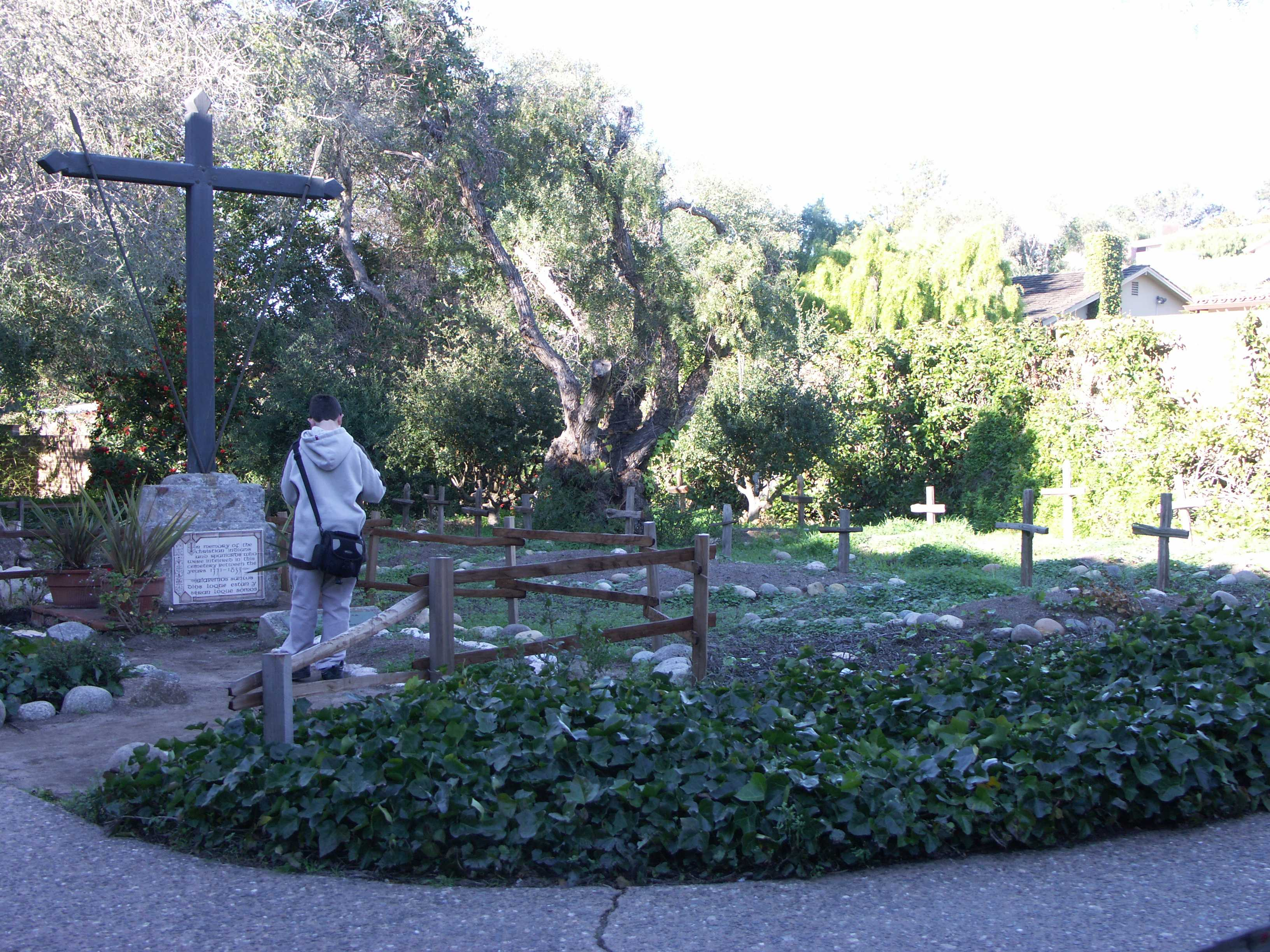
Indian cemetery at Mission San Carlos Borromeo, Carmel, California

These tribes were associated with the following missions, asisténcias, and estáncias:

- Mission San Luis Obispo de Tolosa, in San Luis Obispo
- Mission La Purísima Concepción, northeast of Lompoc
- Mission Santa Inés, in Solvang
- Mission Santa Barbara, in Santa Barbara
- Mission San Buenaventura, in Ventura
- Mission San Fernando Rey de España, in Mission Hills (Los Angeles)
- Mission San Gabriel Arcángel, in San Gabriel
- Mission San Juan Capistrano, in San Juan Capistrano
- Mission San Luis Rey de Francia, in Oceanside
- Mission San Diego de Alcalá, in San Diego
- Santa Ysabel Asistencia, founded in 1818 in Santa Ysabel
- San Antonio de Pala Asistencia (Pala Mission), founded in 1816 in eastern San Diego County
- San Bernardino de Sena Estancia, founded in 1819 in Redlands
- Santa Ana Estancia, founded in 1817 in Costa Mesa
- Las Flores Estancia (Las Flores Asistencia), founded in 1823 in Camp Pendleton

== Northern California missions ==
In northern California, specific tribes are associated geographically with certain missions.

- Mission Dolores in San Francisco (Muwekma Ohlone)
- Mission San Jose in Fremont (Muwekma Ohlone)
- Mission Santa Clara in Santa Clara/San Jose (Muwekma Ohlone)
- Mission Santa Cruz in Santa Cruz (Amah Mutsun band of Costanoan Ohlone)
- Mission San Juan Bautista in San Juan Bautista (Amah-Mutsun Band of Costanoan Ohlone)
- Mission San Carlos Borromeo de Carmelo in Carmel/Monterey (Esselen nation)
- Mission Nuestra Señora de la Soledad in Soledad (Esselen nation)
- Mission San Antonio de Padua in Jolon. (Esselen nation and Salinan nation)

== Mission tribes ==
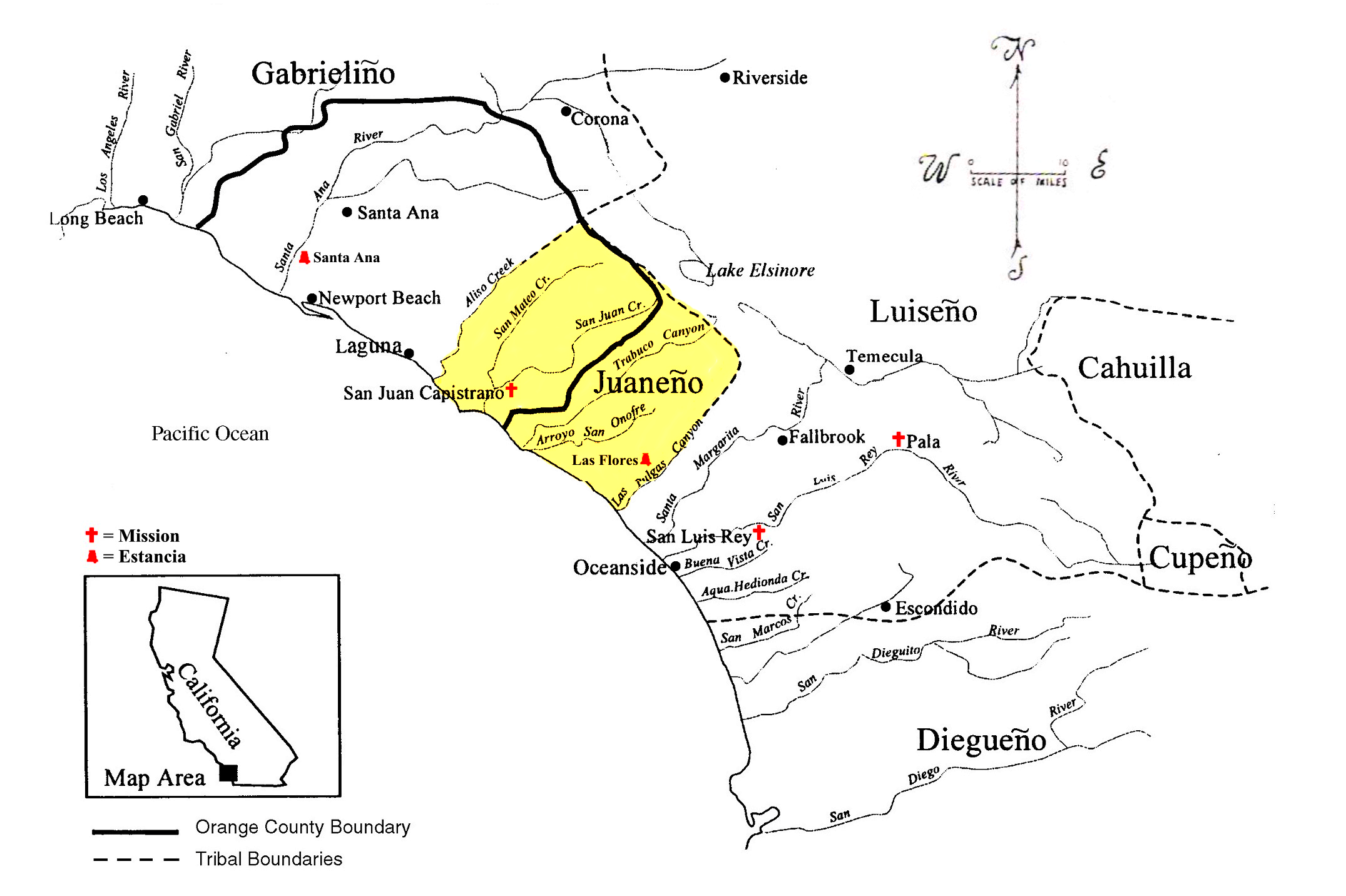
The territorial boundaries of the southern California Indian tribes based on dialect, including the Cahuilla, Chemehuevi, Cupeño, Diegueño, Gabrieliño, Juaneño (highlighted), Luiseño, and Mohave language groups.

Current mission Indian tribes include the following in southern California:

- Agua Caliente Band of Mission Indians (Cahuilla)
- Augustine Band of Mission Indians (Cahuilla)
- Barona Band of Mission Indians (Kumeyaay/Diegueño)
- Barbareño/Ventureño Band of Mission Indians (Barbareño/Ventureño Chumash)
- Cabazon Band of Mission Indians (Cahuilla)
- Cahuilla Band of Mission Indians (Cahuilla)
- Campo Band of Mission Indians (Kumeyaay/Diegueño)
- Capitan Grande Band of Mission Indians (Kumeyaay/Diegueño)
- Cuyapaipe Band of Mission Indians (Kumeyaay/Diegueño)
- Giant Rock Band (unrecognized) of Morongo Serrano-Cahuilla.
- Inaja and Cosmit Band of Mission Indians (Kumeyaay/Diegueño)
- Jamul Band of Mission Indians (Kumeyaay/Diegueño)
- Acjachemen
- Laguna Band of Mission Indians of the Laguna Reservation
- La Jolla Band of Mission Indians (Luiseño)
- La Posta Band of Mission Indians (Kumeyaay/Diegueño)
- Las Palmas Band (unrecognized) of Cahuilla.
- Los Coyotes Band of Mission Indians (Cahuilla and Cupeño)
- Manzanita Band of Mission Indians (Kumeyaay/Diegueño)
- Mesa Grande Band of Mission Indians (Kumeyaay/Diegueño)
- Mission Creek Band of Mission Indians – Mission Creek Reservation of Cahuilla.
- Morongo Band of Mission Indians (Cahuilla, Serrano and Cupeño)
- Pala Band of Mission Indians (Cupeño and Luiseño)
- Pauma Band of Mission Indians (Luiseño)
- Pechanga Band of Mission Indians (Luiseño)
- Ramona Band or Village of Mission Indians (Cahuilla)
- San Cayetano Band (unrecognized) of Cahuilla.
- San Manuel Band of Mission Indians (Serrano)
- San Miguel Arcangel, descendants of Mission San Miguel Indians in San Miguel, California.
- San Pasqual Band of Mission Indians (Kumeyaay/Diegueño)
- Santa Rosa Band of Mission Indians (Cahuilla)
- Santa Ynez Band of Mission Indians (Chumash)
- Santa Ysabel Band of Mission Indians (Kumeyaay/Diegueño)
- Soboba Band of Mission Indians (Luiseño)
- Sycuan Band of Mission Indians (Kumeyaay/Diegueño)
- Temecula Band (unrecognized) of Mission Indians (Luiseño and Serrano).
- Torres-Martinez Band of Mission Indians (Cahuilla)
- Twenty-Nine Palms Band of Mission Indians (Chemehuevi with some Cahuilla and Luiseño descent)

Current Mission Indian tribes north of the present day ones listed above, in the Los Angeles Basin, Central Coast, Salinas Valley, Monterey Bay, and San Francisco Bay Areas, also were identified with the local mission of their Indian Reductions in those regions.

== See also ==
- Spanish Indians
- Moravian Indians
- Praying Indians
- Indian Reductions
- California genocide
- California mission clash of cultures
- Population of Native California
- Native American history of California
- Native Americans in California
- Slavery among Native Americans in the United States
- American Indian reservations in California
- Genízaros
- Indigenous peoples of California
- Detribalization
