= USNS Redstone =

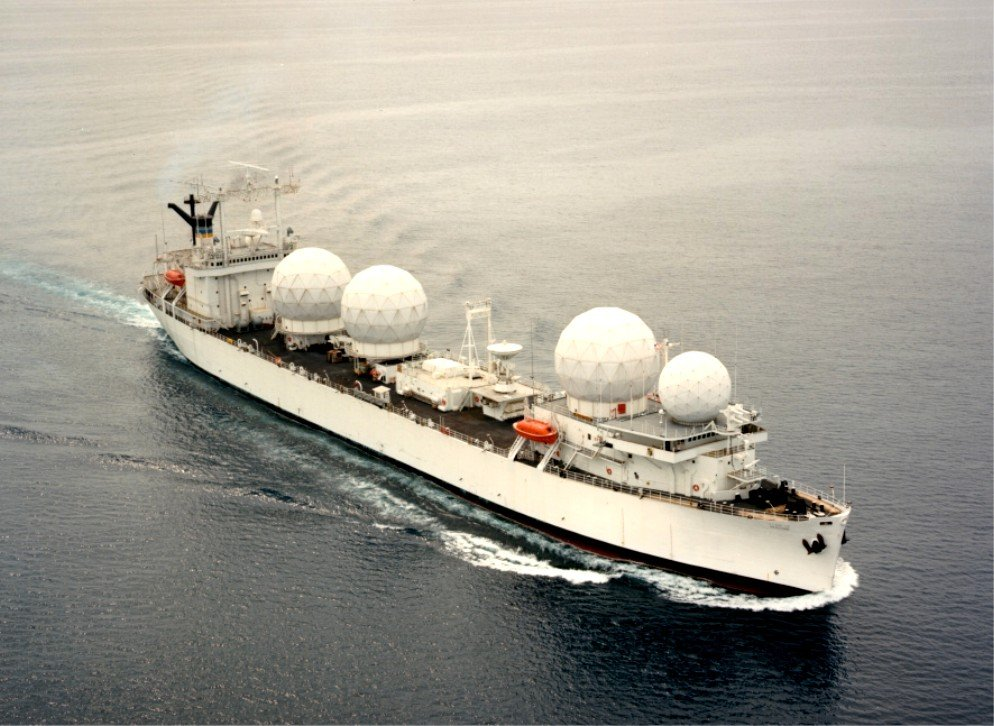
- USNS Redstone

History

United States
- Name: Mission De Pala (1944 – 1964); Johnstown (1964 – 1964); Redstone (1964 – 1995)
- Namesake: Mission San Antonio de Pala, California; Johnstown, Pennsylvania; Redstone Arsenal, Alabama
- Builder: Marinship, Sausalito CA
- Laid down: 26 November 1943
- Launched: 28 February 1944
- Acquired: 22 April 1944 (delivery)
- In service: 1944 – 1958 as tanker; 1964 – 1993 as Apollo tracking/communications ship
- Out of service: 1993
- Identification: Official number: 245359; IMO number: 8835542
- Fate: Sold for scrap and removed from reserve fleet 30 January 1995.

General characteristics – tanker
- Class & type: MC type T2‑SE-A2 tanker; (Navy) Mission Buenaventura-class oiler
- Tonnage: 10,461 GRT; 16,583 DWT
- Displacement: 5,532 long tons (5,621 t) light; 21,880 long tons (22,231 t) full
- Length: 524 ft (160 m)
- Beam: 68 ft (21 m)
- Draft: 30 ft (9.1 m)
- Speed: 16.5 knots (30.6 km/h; 19.0 mph)
- Complement: 52
- Armament: None

General characteristics – Apollo tracking ship
- Displacement: 16,800 long tons (17,070 t) light; 24,700 long tons (25,096 t) full
- Length: 595 ft 2 in (181 m)
- Beam: 75 ft 2 in (23 m)
- Draft: 24 ft 11 in (8 m)
- Speed: 16 kn (18 mph; 30 km/h)
- Crew: 44; 108 scientific/technical
- Notes: Multiple modifications. Antennas and equipment as Apollo tracking/communications ship.

USNS Redstone, designated T‑AGM‑20, was a tracking ship assigned to Apollo space mission support under the control of the Eastern Range. For a brief time during conversion the ship was named Johnstown with the designation AGM‑20.

The ship was built as Mission De Pala, named for Mission San Antonio de Pala in eastern San Diego County, California, a Type T2-SE-A2 tanker, for the United States Maritime Commission during World War II. After the war the tanker was transferred to the United States Navy for operation by the Naval Transportation Service as Mission De Pala (AO-114) and later the successor Military Sea Transportation Service as USNS Mission De Pala (T-AO-114). The tanker was a member of the Mission Buenaventura-class oiler.

== Service history ==
=== World War II, 1944-1946 ===
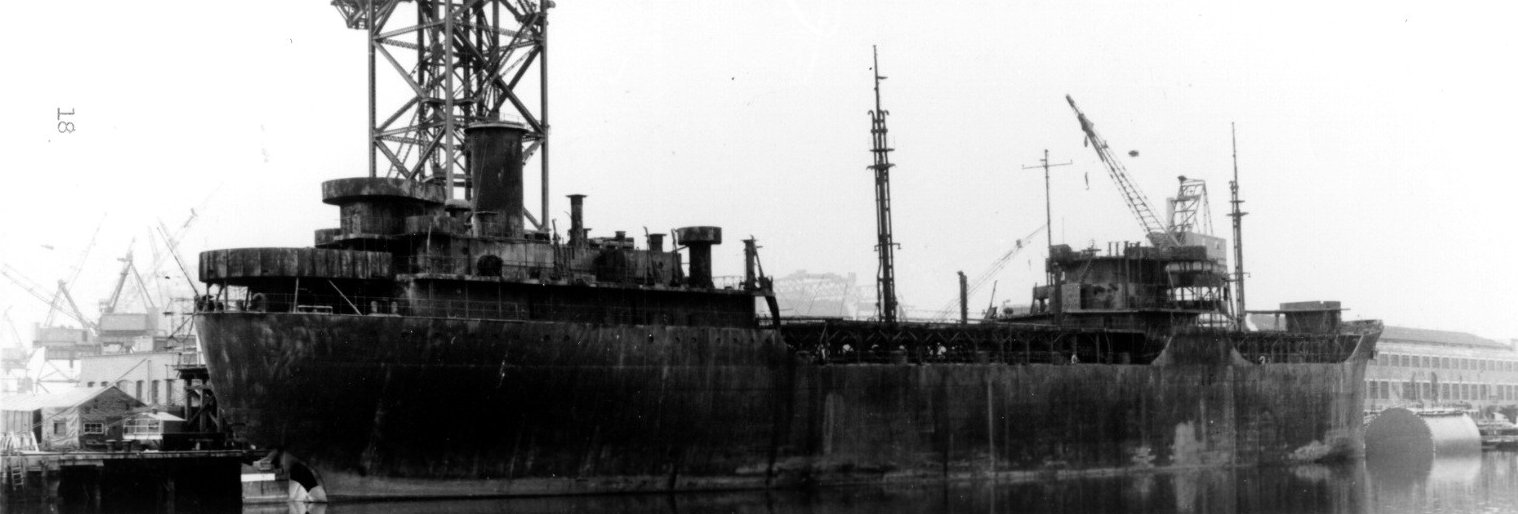
USNS Mission De Pala.

Mission De Pala was laid down on 26 November 1943 under a Maritime Commission contract by Marinship Corporation, (Note: DANFS error on builder's name. There was no "Marine Ship Corporation", Sausalito. The yard there was Marinship Corporation, an emergency yard funded by the Maritime Commission.) Sausalito, California. The T2-SE-A2 tanker was launched on 28 February 1944, sponsored by Mrs. Francis D. Malone. The ship, official number 245359, was delivered to the War Shipping Administration for operation by Pacific Tankers Inc. under a general agency agreement on 22 April 1944.

The tanker spent the remainder of the war carrying oil and fuel to allied forces overseas, in the Pacific (during which time she was three times awarded the Navy Battle "E" Ribbon as well as the National Defense Service Medal). Returned to the Maritime Commission on 28 May 1946, she was laid up in the Maritime Reserve Fleet at Mobile, Alabama.

=== Navy tanker 1947—1958 ===
The Maritime Commission transferred custody of the ship to the Navy on 22 October 1947 upon which the Navy applied the designation AO-114 for service with Naval Transportation Service (NTS). NTS was merged into the Military Sea Transportation Service (MSTS) and on 1 October 1949 the ship was designated USNS Mission De Pala (T-AO-114). Her service with MSTS was brief and on 23 December 1949 the ship was laid up in the Reserve Fleet at Orange, Texas.

The Navy reactivated Mission De Pala on 21 July 1950 for service with MSTS when the Korean War created an urgent need for logistics support vessels, especially tankers. The tanker spent most of the war shuttling between Korea, Pearl Harbor, and the west coast of the United States carrying fuel overseas. The Navy declared the ship surplus on 15 November 1954 returning it to Maritime Commission custody for up in the Maritime Reserve Fleet at James River, Virginia. She was struck from the Naval Vessel Register on 22 June 1955.

The Navy reactivated the ship, taking custody on 6 July 1956, for service with MSTS to be operated, under charter, by Marine Transport Lines, Incorporated. On 13 March 1958 the Maritime Administration took permanent custody of the ship for lay up in the Maritime Reserve Fleet at Orange. She was struck from the Naval Vessel Register on the same date.

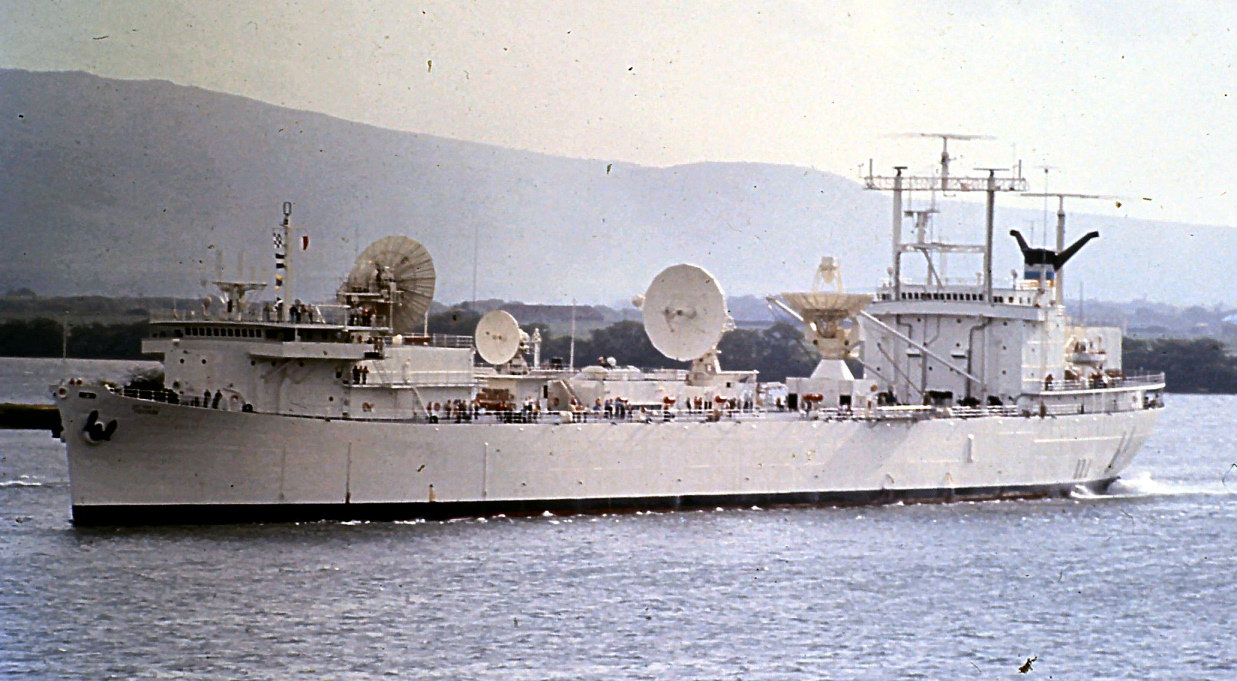
USNS Redstone underway, Pearl Harbor (ca. 1966–1968).

=== Apollo tracking/communications ship 1964-1993 ===
On 19 October 1964 the Maritime Commission returned permanent custody of Mission De Pala to the Navy for conversion into a missile‑range instrumentation ship. (Note: DANFS has the date exactly one month earlier. MARAD records are precise. DANFS may be the date on which the decision was made or simply an error by the writers.) Converted at General Dynamics Quincy Shipbuilding Division, Quincy, Massachusetts she was "jumboized" by having a 72‑foot section added amidships, an extensive array of electronic equipment was installed and a nest of antennas added topside. Essentially the ship was virtually rebuilt in order to prepare her for her new role. While under conversion, she was renamed and redesignated Johnstown (AGM-20) on 8 April 1965, but she was renamed Redstone on 1 September 1965. Upon completion of conversion, she was accepted on 30 June 1966 by MSTS, for service as USNS Redstone (T-AGM-20).

Satellite communications room 17 August 1967.

Designed for use as a seagoing tracking and communications station for the Apollo program test series and moon shot, into 1969, she continued these duties and played her part in helping fulfill the late President John F. Kennedy's pledge to land a man on the moon before 1970.

== Deactivation and disposal ==
The ship was removed from service on 6 August 1993. She was struck from the Naval Register on 7 December 1993. On 6 August 1993 the ship was placed in the James River reserve fleet until withdrawn briefly 23 June through 31 August 1994 for stripping before sale and scrapping. After being sold for scrapping the ship finally left the fleet on 30 January 1995.
