= Las Flores Estancia =

19th-century Catholic missionary outpost

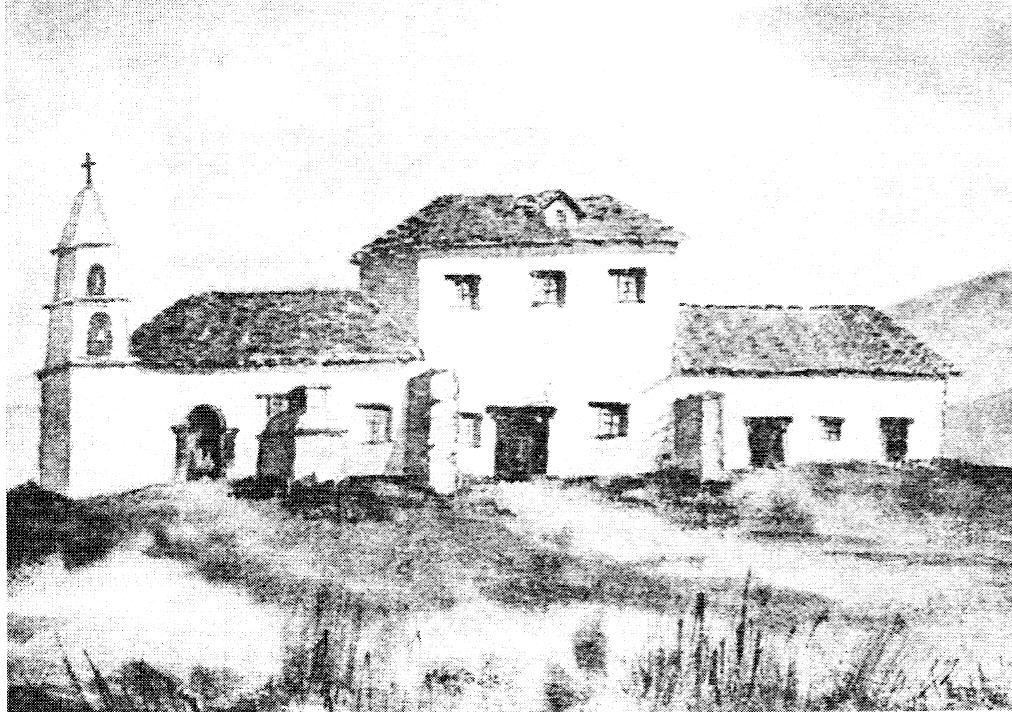
- Las Flores' "San Pedro Chapel" as it appeared around 1850. The structure, along with its adjoining buildings, were constructed in 1823.

- Location within California Location within the United States
- Location: near San Clemente, California
- Coordinates: 33°17′59.81″N 117°27′39.85″W
- Name as founded: Estancia de la Misión de San Luis, Rey de Francia
- English translation: Station of the Mission San Luis Rey de Francia
- Patron: Saint Peter, the Apostle
- Founded: 1823
- Founded by: Father Antonio Peyrí
- Military district: First
- Native tribe(s) Spanish name(s): Payomkawichum-Luiseño + Acagchemem-Juaneño
- Native place name: Huis'ne
- Governing body: United States Government
- Current use: Boy Scout Camp

U.S. National Register of Historic Places
- Designated: November 24, 1968
- Reference no.: 68000021

U.S. National Historic Landmark
- Designated: November 24, 1968

California Historical Landmark
- Reference no.: #616

The Las Flores Estancia (also known as Las Flores Asistencia) was established in 1823 as an estancia ("station"). It was part of the Spanish missions, asistencias, and estancias system in Las Californias—Alta California. Las Flores Estancia was situated approximately halfway between Mission San Luis Rey de Francia and Mission San Juan Capistrano. It is located near Bell Canyon on the Camp Pendleton Marine Corps Base ten miles south of the City of San Clemente in northern San Diego County, California. The estancia is also home to the architecturally significant National Historic Landmark Las Flores Adobe, completed in 1868.

== History ==
The first recorded baptisms in upper Las Californias took place on July 22, 1769, on the banks of a nearby stream, dubbed Los Cristianos by the Spanish soldiers who accompanied the missionaries northward during the Portolà expedition. Today, the site (referred to more commonly as La Cañada de los Bautismos, literally "The Gorge of the Baptisms," or simply Los Christianitos, "The Little Christians") located at 33°25′41.58″N 117°36′34.92″W is designated as California Historical Landmark.

Known at one time as the "San Pedro Rancho," the property featured a tile-roofed chapel (visita) and a hostel, both built by relocated Luiseño and Juaneño Native Americans, the latter for the use of traveling clergy. The buildings formed three sides of a square, 142 feet by 153 feet, all roofed with tile. A portion of the south wing had a second story, and the campanile (bell tower) was utilized as a navigational aid by early sailing ships. The chapel was visited by residents of two nearby Native American villages, Chumella and Questmille. Mission San Luis Rey was raising sheep at Las Flores as early as 1810. To sustain the installation barley, maize, and wheat, were grown and cattle were grazed at nearby Las Pulgas ("the fleas"); also notable was the production of hides and tallow.

Although Governor José Figueroa (who took office in 1833) initially attempted to keep the mission system intact, the Mexican Congress nevertheless passed An Act for the Secularization of the Missions of California on August 17, 1833. Thereafter, the Franciscans all but abandoned the mission, taking with them most everything of value, after which the locals salvaged many of the mission buildings for construction materials. In spite of this neglect, the Luiseño Native American town at Las Flores (along with the Juaneño one at San Juan Capistrano and Luiseño one at San Dieguito) continued on for some time under a provision in Gobernador Echeandía's 1826 Proclamation that allowed for the partial conversion of missions to pueblos. The site was also the scene of the April 1838 battle between the forces of Juan Bautista Alvarado and Carlos Antonio Carrillo in which the provincial governorship of Alta California was contested.

The former estancia formed part of an 1841 Mexican land grant for the "Rancho Santa Margarita y Las Flores", granted to the Pico brothers. They built a large traditional Spanish adobe on the estancia grounds, and operated a sheep ranch into the 1860s, when it failed due to drought. In 1864 Pio Pico sold the Las Flores ranch to his brother-in-law, Juan Forster, who made it part of a much larger (144,000 acres (580 km^{2})) ranch.

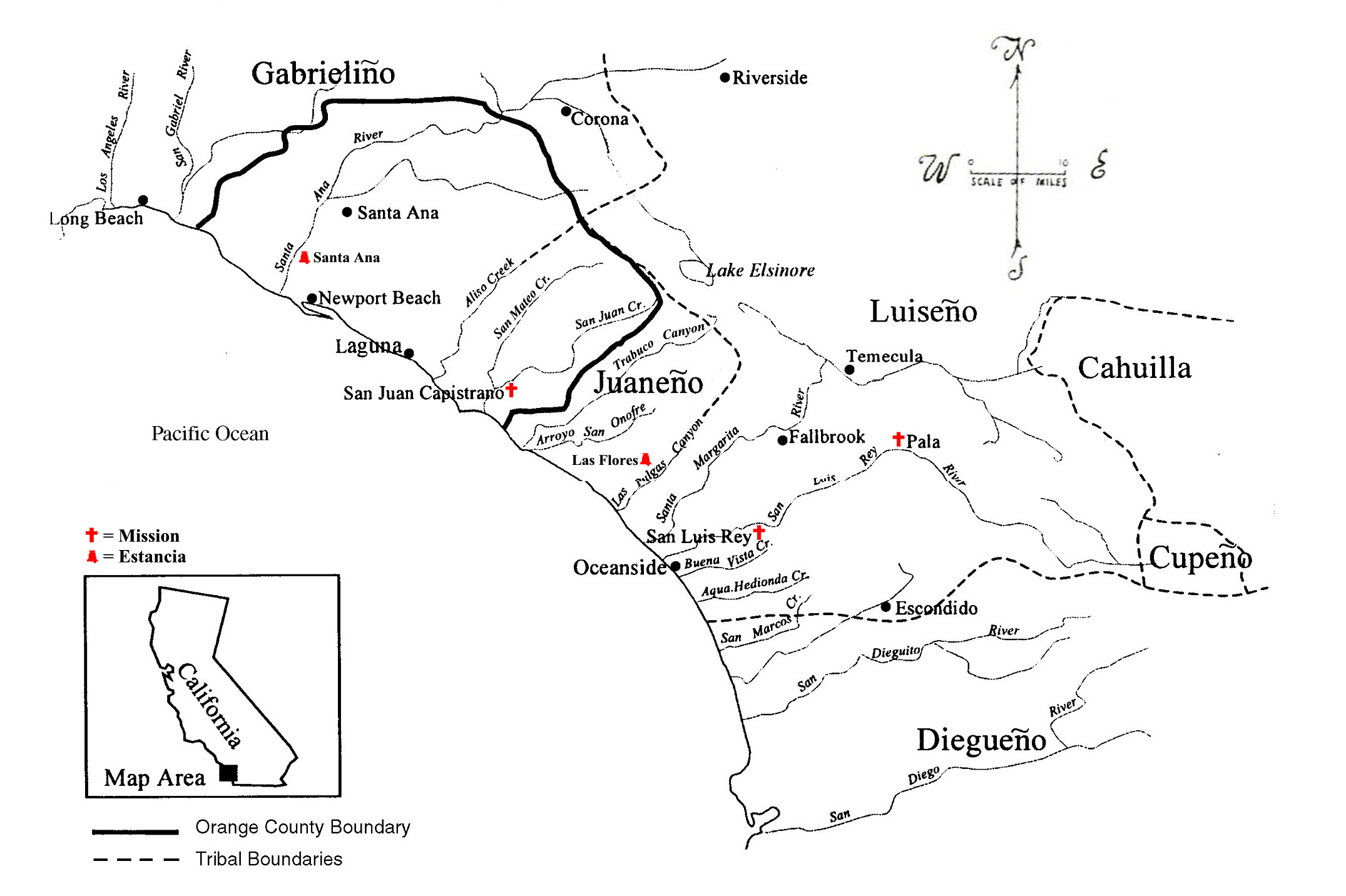
Las Flores Estancia and the location of the missions at San Juan Capistrano, San Luis Rey, and Pala along with the Santa Ana Estancia are shown above. Also shown are the territorial boundaries of the Southern California Indian tribes based on dialect, including the Cahuilla, Cupeño, Diegueño, Gabrieliño, Juaneño, and Luiseño language groups.

The ranch was acquired in 1941 by the United States Government when it established the United States Marine Corps' Camp Pendleton. The government subsequently leased 46 acres (19 ha) around the estancia to the Boy Scouts of America. In 1974, the Boy Scouts constructed a camp (Rancho Las Flores) on the property which is visited by thousands of scouts and other youth annually.

== Las Flores Adobe ==
The Las Flores Adobe was built in 1867–68 by Marco Forster, the son of Juan Forster. It is located on the west side of Stuart Mesa Road, near its junction with Las Pulgas Road. It is a large U-shaped structure, with a main two-story section forming one side of the U, and single-story sections forming its other elements. The two-story section is a late but high quality example of Monterey Colonial architecture, with a wood frame, plastered adobe walls, and a wooden veranda encircling it. The building underwent a major restoration beginning 2001, sponsored by the Marine Corps and the Camp Pendleton Historical Society. The society leads periodic tours of the site.

== See also ==
- List of Spanish missions in California
- San Antonio de Pala Asistencia
- Luiseño
- Mission Indians
- California mission clash of cultures
- Mission San Juan Capistrano
- Mission San Luis Rey de Francia
- List of National Historic Landmarks in California
- National Register of Historic Places in San Diego County, California
