= Mexican Secularization Act of 1833 =

Legislation concerning the separation of church and state

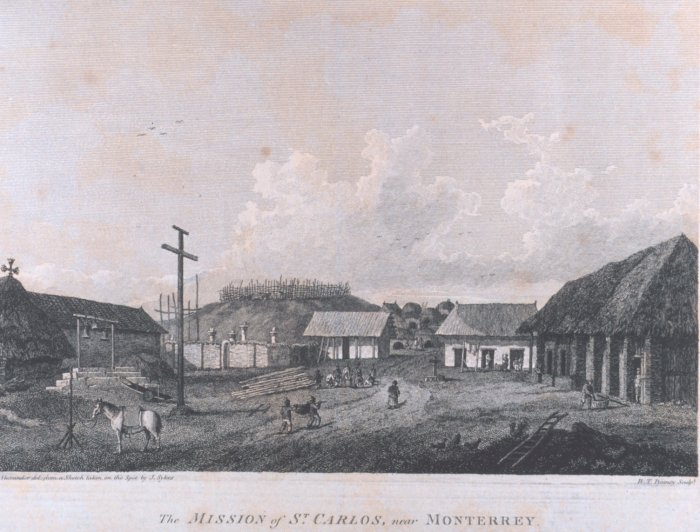
St. Carlos, near Monterey, c. 1792

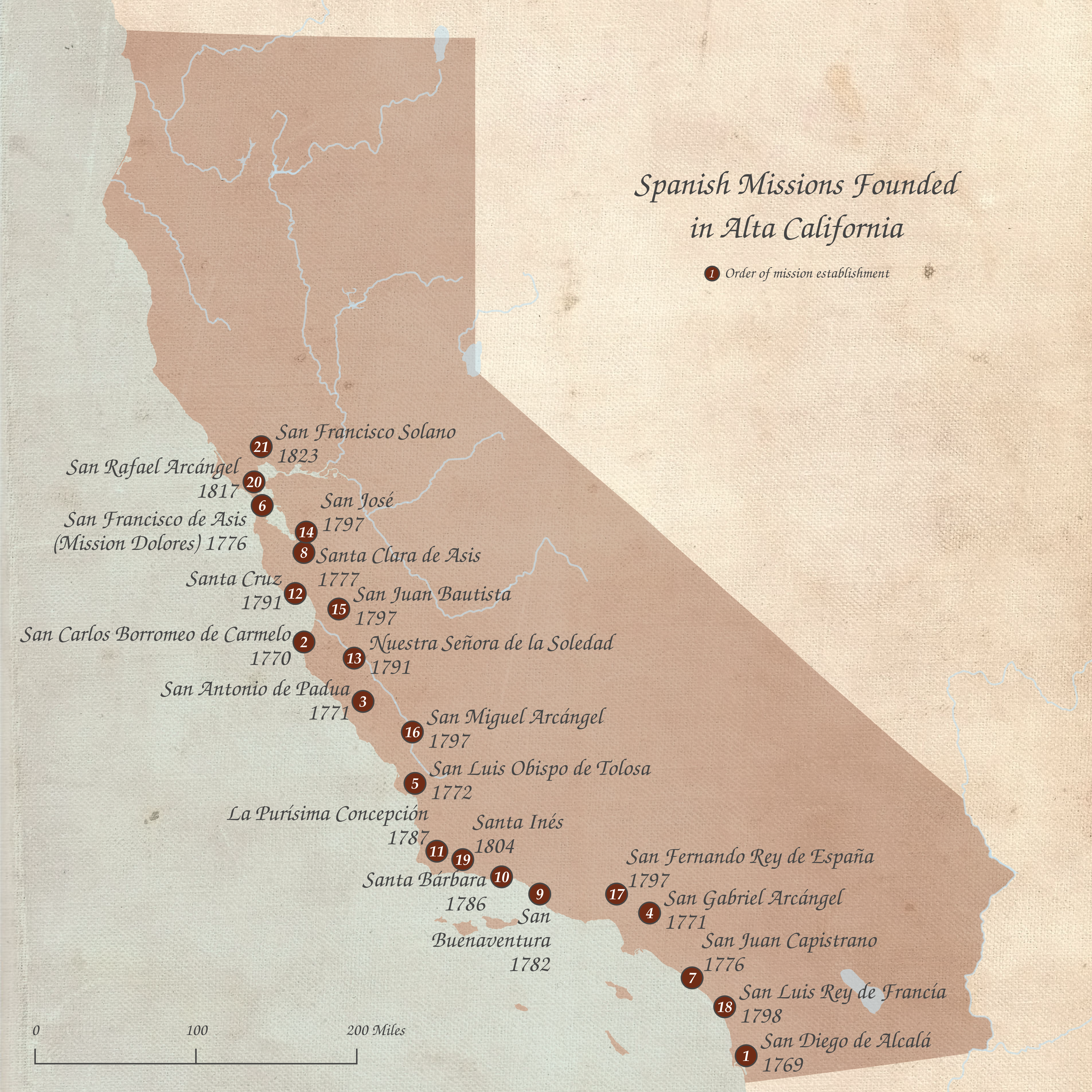
Spanish missions in California

The Mexican Secularization Act of 1833, officially called the Decree for the Secularization of the Missions of California, was an act passed by the Congress of the Union of the First Mexican Republic which secularized the Californian missions. The act nationalized the missions, transferring their ownership from the Franciscan Order of the Catholic Church to the Mexican authorities.

The act was passed twelve years after Mexico won its independence from Spain in 1821. Mexico feared Spain would continue to have influence and power in California because most of the Spanish missions in California remained loyal to the Roman Catholic Church in Spain. As the new Mexican republic matured, calls for the secularization ("disestablishment") of the missions increased.

Secularization took place for 10 missions in 1834, 6 in 1835, and the other 5 in 1836. Religious services ended, and most priests left the province. The buildings were stripped of valuables, and left to deteriorate. The rich farmland was not given to the Indians as planned, but was sold or given it away in large grants called ranchos. Secularization also emancipated Indigenous peoples of California from the missions and closed the monjeríos, although only a minority of Indigenous peoples were distributed land grants, which left many of them landless to work the ranchos.

== Background ==
The Spanish missions in Alta California were a series of 21 religious and military outposts; established by Catholic priests of the Franciscan order between 1769 and 1823 for the purpose of spreading Christianity among the local Native Americans. The missions were part of the first major effort by Europeans to colonize the Pacific Coast region, the most northern and western parts of Spain's North American land claims. The settlers introduced European fruits, vegetables, cattle, horses, ranching and technology into the Alta California region and to the Mission Indians. The El Camino Real (Royal Road) connected missions from Loreto, Mexico to Mission San Francisco Solano, in Sonoma, a length of over 1200 miles. Between 1683 and 1834, Jesuit and Franciscan missionaries established a series of religious outposts from today's Baja California and Baja California Sur into present-day California.

== Proclamation of Emancipation ==
José María de Echeandía, the first Mexican-born, elected Governor of Alta California issued a "Proclamation of Emancipation" (or "Prevenciónes de Emancipacion") on July 25, 1826. All Indians within the military districts of San Diego, Santa Barbara, and Monterey who were found qualified were freed from missionary rule and made eligible to become Mexican citizens. Those who wished to remain under mission tutelage (guardianship) were exempted from most forms of corporal punishment. By 1830 even those new to California appeared confident in their own abilities to operate the mission ranches and farms independently; the padres, however, doubted the capabilities of their charges in this regard. In 1831, the number of Indians under missionary control in all of Upper-Alta California was about 18,683, while garrison soldiers, free settlers, and "other classes" totaled 4,342.

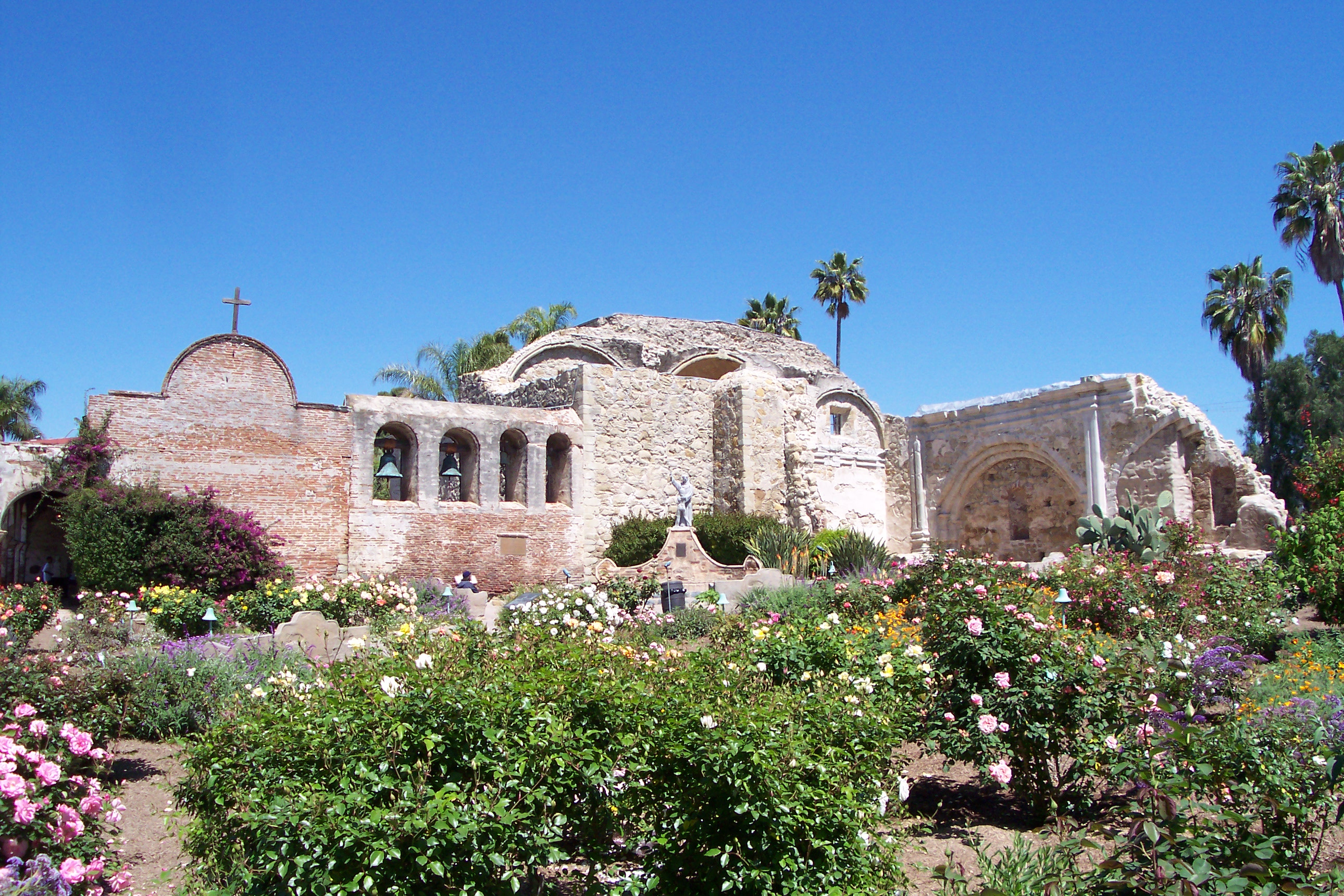
Mission San Juan Capistrano

New immigration, of both Mexican and foreign origins, increased pressure on the Alta California government to seize the Church-controlled mission properties and dispossess the natives in accordance with Echeandía's directive. Despite the fact that Echeandía's emancipation plan was met with little encouragement from the newcomers who populated the southern missions, he was nonetheless determined to test the scheme on a large scale at Mission San Juan Capistrano. To that end, he appointed a number of comisionados (commissioners) to oversee the emancipation of the Indians.

The Mexican government passed legislation on December 20, 1827, that mandated the expulsion of all Spaniards younger than 60 years of age from Mexican territories. Spaniards could pose a threat to Mexico because Spain did not recognize Mexican independence and attempted to regain control over its former colony. Governor Echeandía nevertheless intervened on behalf of some Franciscans to prevent their deportation once the law took effect in California.

== Secularization Act ==
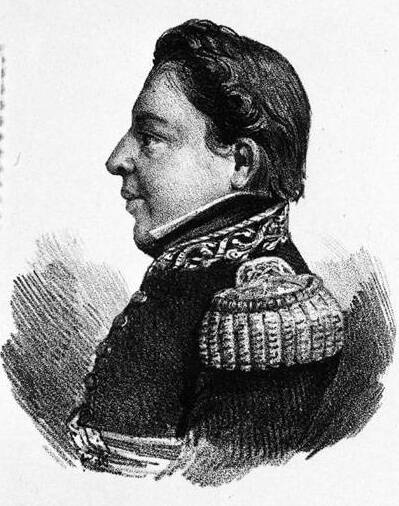
Governor José Figueroa

Governor José Figueroa, who took office in 1833, initially attempted to keep the mission system intact, but after the Mexican Congress passed its Decree for the Secularization of the Missions of the Californias on August 17, 1833, he took action to start secularization enactment. In 1833, Figueroa replaced the Spanish-born Franciscan padres at all of the settlements north of Mission San Antonio de Padua with Mexican-born Franciscan priests from the College of Guadalupe de Zacatecas. In response, Father-Presidente Narciso Durán transferred the headquarters of the Alta California Mission System to Mission Santa Bárbara, where it remained until 1846.

=== Failed distribution to indigenous people ===
Governor Figueroa issued a regulation (Reglamento Provisional para la secularizacion de las Misiones) on August 9, 1834, outlining the requirements for the distribution of property (land, cattle, and equipment) to each mission's neophytes. Among the provisions were that "5. To each head of a family and to all over 20 years old, will be given from the Mission lands a lot not over 400 nor less than 100 varas square" (28 to 7 acres), plus "6....pro rata...one-half of the livestock" and "7.... half or less of the existing chattels, tools, and seed". The Act also provided for the colonization of both Alta California and Baja California, the expenses of this latter move to be borne by the proceeds gained from the sale of the mission land and some buildings to private parties; many started ranches. The ranches made of former mission pasture lands were divided into large land grants, thus greatly increasing the number of private landholdings in Alta California.

This meant that the missions would hold title only to the worship chapel, the residences of the priests, and a small amount of land surrounding the church for use as gardens. In some missions, all of the other buildings were lost, and some mission buildings were divided, with a physical wall added into the mission buildings. With the loss of all support from the surrounding land and support buildings – like livestock, orchards, barns, tanning, blacksmithing, candle making, vineyards, winery, water rights, loom, Beehive ovens, carpenter shop, soap making, grain silo, in some cases the mission courtyard and more – the Franciscans had no means of support for themselves or the natives. The Franciscans soon thereafter abandoned most of the missions, taking with them almost everything of value, after which the locals typically plundered the mission buildings for construction materials, as the four to six soldiers assigned to guard each Mission were dismissed.

=== Mission lands confiscated ===
Mission San Juan Capistrano was the very first mission to have its land taken away; on August 9, 1834, Governor Figueroa issued his "Decree of Confiscation." Nine other settlements quickly followed, with six more in 1835; San Buenaventura and Mission San Francisco de Asís were among the last to have their land taken away, in June and December 1836, respectively.

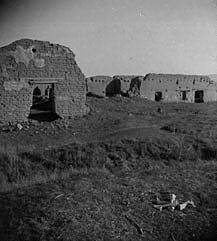
The ruins of Mission Nuestra Señora de la Soledad circa 1900.

Mission Nuestra Señora de la Soledad land was sold and over time all the buildings became ruined. In 1859, the buildings' ruins and 42 acres of land were returned to the Church. Restoration began only in 1954.

In 1838, Mission San Juan Capistrano property was auctioned off under questionable circumstances for $710 worth of tallow and hides, (equivalent to $15,000 in 2004 U.S. dollars) to Englishman John (Don Juan) Forster (Governor Pío Pico's brother-in-law, whose family would take up residence in the friars' quarters for the next 20 years) and his partner James McKinley. More families would subsequently take up residence in other portions of the Mission buildings. Father José María Zalvidea left San Juan Capistrano around November 25, 1842, when Mission San Luis Rey de Francia's Father Ibarra died, leaving the Mission without a resident priest for the first time (Zalvidea had been the Mission's sole priest ever since the death of Father Josef Barona in 1831). The first secular priest to take charge of the Mission, Reverend José Maria Rosáles, arrived on October 8, 1843; Father Vicente Pascual Oliva, the last resident missionary, died on January 2, 1848. The Mission's ruins and 44.40 acres were returned to the Church in 1865.

Mission San Diego de Alcalá and some other missions were offered for sale to citizens, and some Mission land was given to ex-military officers who had fought in the War of Independence. On June 8, 1846, Mission San Diego de Alcalá was given to Santiago Argüello by Governor Pío Pico "...for services rendered to the government." After the United States annexed California, the Mission was used by the military from 1846 to 1862. Most of the grants were made to rich "Californios" of Spanish background who had long been casting envious eyes on the vast holdings of the Roman Catholic missions. In 1845, California Governor Pio Pico confiscated the lands of Mission San Diego de Alcalá. He granted eleven square leagues (about 48,800 acres, 197 km^{2}) of the El Cajon Valley to Dona Maria Antonio Estudillo, daughter of José Antonio Estudillo, alcalde of San Diego, to repay a $500 government obligation. The grant was originally called Rancho Santa Monica and encompassed present-day El Cajon, Bostonia, Santee, Lakeside, Flinn Springs, and the eastern part of La Mesa. It also contained the 28-acre (0.11 km^{2}) Rancho Cañada de Los Coches grant. Maria Estudillo was the wife of Don Miguel Pedrorena (1808–1850), a native of Madrid, Spain, who had come to California from Peru in 1838 to operate a trading business. In 1862 the 22 acres and mission ruins were returned to the Church by the U.S. government.

Mission San Buenaventura in 1845 was rented to Don Jose Arnaz and Narciso Botello and was later sold to Arnaz. The church, clergy residence, cemetery, orchard, and vineyard were returned to the Church in 1862, and major changes done in 1893.

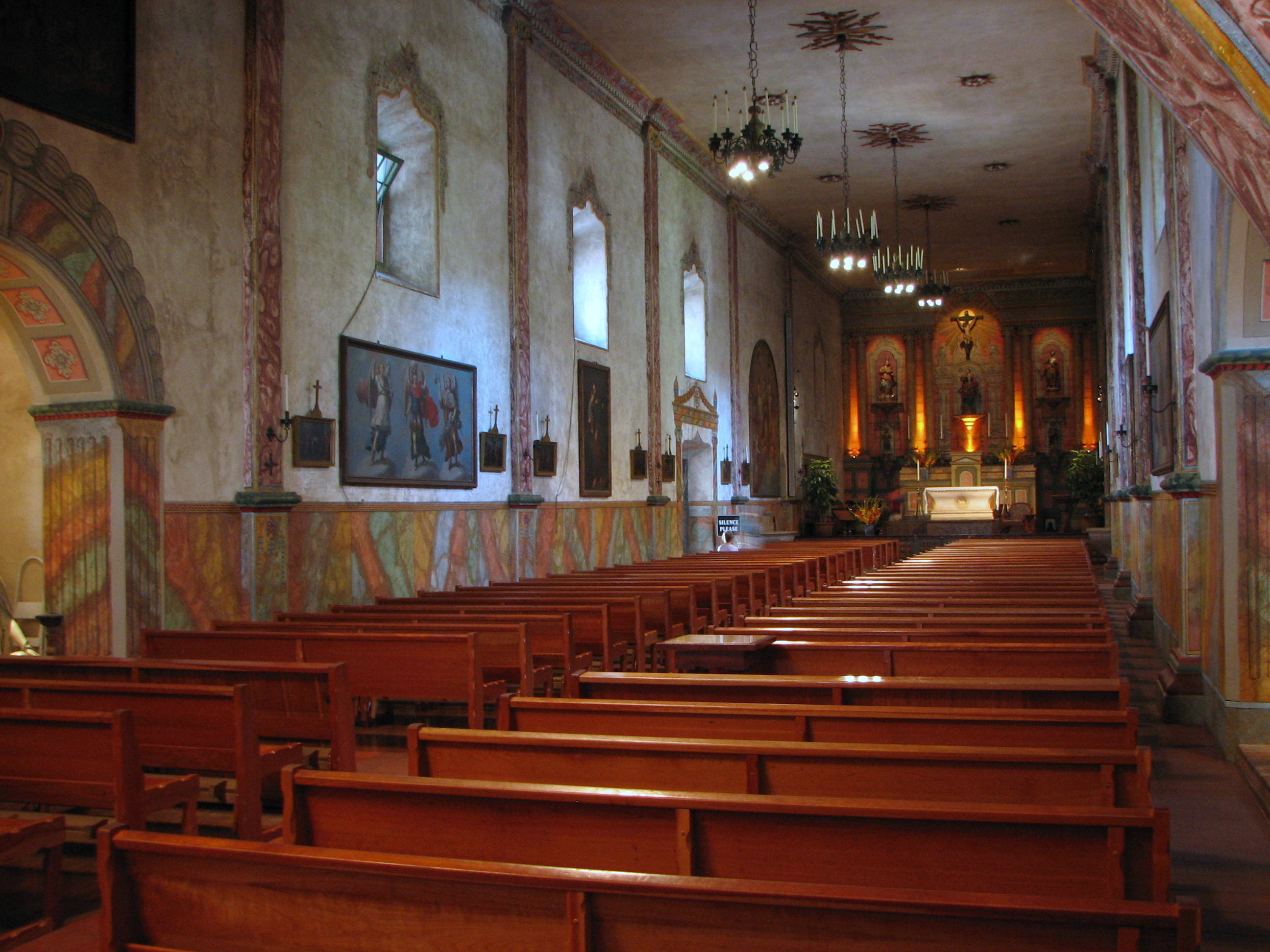
Mission Santa Bárbara

Mission Santa Clara de Asís in 1836: the Mission land was sold off, but most buildings continued to be used as a parish church. In 1851 the running of the church transferred from the Franciscans to the Jesuits. The Jesuits founded a college there, which became Santa Clara University.

Mission San Carlos Borromeo de Carmelo land was sold off in 1834. The padres had to buy a small strip of land back in order to avoid trespassing when entering the church. But later all the buildings were abandoned and became ruined. Mission ruins and 9 acres were returned to the Catholic Church in 1859.

Mission San Antonio de Padua was put up for sale, with no bids. But with the fear of being sold, the Mission started to fall into neglect. Father Doroteo Ambris, a young priest from Mexico, started to live at the Mission with a few natives in 1851. On 31 May 1863, the Mission was returned to the Church with 33 acres by an order signed by Abraham Lincoln.

Mission San Gabriel Arcángel was sold to American settlers, and the funds were used to pay off Governor Pico's debt. The Mission was returned to the Franciscans in 1843.

Mission San Luis Obispo de Tolosa was sold in 1845 by Pico. Everything except the church chapel was sold for a total of $510 (valued at $70,000 in 1845). The Mission was returned in 1859.

Mission San Francisco de Asís had the Mission lands sold off in 1845. The Mission quadrangle buildings and courtyard were sold or leased to businesses. The Mission was thus maintained, and in 1857 returned.

Mission Santa Barbara in 1835: all the land was sold or given away, but the Mission buildings remained under the control of the Catholic Church and became a parish church. Thus on August 17, 1833, Father Presidente Narciso Durán transferred the Missions' headquarters to Santa Barbara, making Mission Santa Barbara the repository of some 3,000 original documents that had been scattered throughout the California missions.

Mission Santa Cruz land was sold or given away in 1834, all 32 building looted, and the church left in ruin. President Buchanan, in 1859, returned Mission Santa Cruz and 17 acres to the Church.

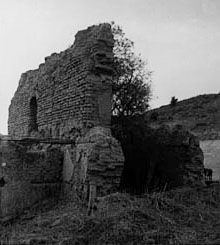
The ruins of Mission La Purísima Concepción near Lompoc, California, c. 1900.

La Purisima Mission: in 1845 all land and buildings were sold. The church turned to ruins over time. The ruins were returned to the Church in 1874.

Mission San José was sold to private interests in 1845 for $12,000. All buildings decayed and the land was not put to use. Native people who were to get the land had fled and found themselves unable to readjust to their former way of life. In 1858 the Mission ruins and 28 acres of land were returned.

Mission San Juan Bautista: the land was sold off, but the nearby town of San Juan supported the Church, so it did not fall into decay. Thus services continued without interruption. In 1859 the remaining buildings and 55 acres of land were given back.

Mission San Miguel Arcángel had its land sold off. The William Reed family lived in the buildings until 1848. Then the Mission was closed and began to decay. In 1859 the Mission ruins were returned, but no priest was sent to the ruins. In 1878 the Catholic Church sent priests and restoration started.

Mission San Fernando Rey de España had its land sold off in 1834. Mission buildings were used as military headquarters, including Governor Pico and John C. Frémont. In 1861 the Mission buildings and 75 acres of land were returned. The buildings were disintegrating, as beams, tiles and nails were taken from the church by settlers. The buildings had been leased to a number of businesses, and the premises served as a hog farm. San Fernando's church did not become a working church again till 1923.

Mission San Luis Rey de Francia was sold in 1834 to private owners. But in 1846 it was occupied by U.S. Army troops under Captain Frémont. Some Mission buildings in poor shape and 65 acres of land were returned in 1865.

Mission Santa Inés land was sold off in 1836, with some buildings rented out by the government. The Mission had been divided with priests living in part and maintaining a chapel. Late in 1843, the Governor gave 350,000 acres to Bishop Francisco García Diego to start the College of Our Lady of Refuge, the first college in California. In 1846 the college moved to a new site and the land was sold. The college was abandoned in 1881 and by then the Mission buildings were disintegrating. Some of the Mission property was returned to the Church in 1862.

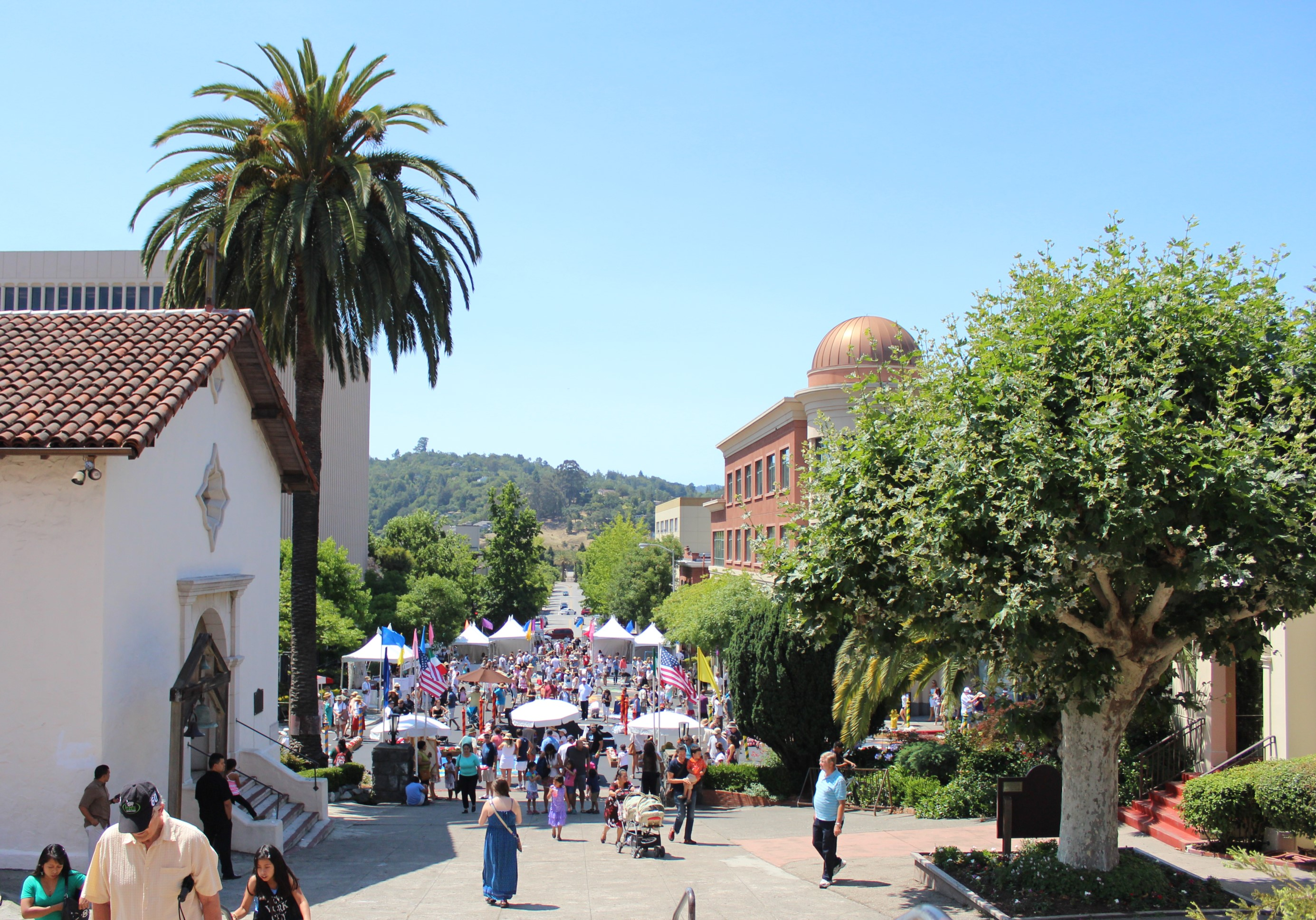
San Rafael Arcángel restored church on the left

Mission San Rafael Arcángel was looted by Governor Mariano Vallejo, the commandant of the San Francisco Presidio. Vallejo took much of the livestock, equipment and supplies, and some of the fruit trees, to his ranch in nearby Sonoma. The Mission had been abandoned by 1844. The empty buildings were sold for $8,000 in 1846. The empty Mission was used shortly by John C. Fremont as his headquarters. Six-and-a-half acres of land were returned in 1855, all in ruins. Rather than rebuild, in 1861 the Mission ruins were sold to a carpenter, who demolished the church ruins. In 1869 the land was purchased back and a new gothic architecture church was built on the site.

Mission San Francisco Solano, the last and northernmost mission, was also the only one built after Mexican independence. The Governor wanted a Mexican presence north of the San Francisco Bay to keep out the Russians who had established Fort Ross. In July 1835 Mission San Francisco Solano was taken over by General Mariano Guadalupe Vallejo, the commissioner of the lands, at the age of 27. At first he gave some of the lands to the native mission workers as ordered. But later he transferred all the land and buildings to his own Rancho Petaluma Adobe of 44,000 acres in the Petaluma Valley. Vallejo laid out the town of Sonoma in 1835. He had a large plaza made in front of the old Mission chapel. But he then took roof tiles from the church and put them on his own house. Now in very poor shape, the Mission church was torn down. In need of a church for the town he made, in 1841 Vallejo had a small chapel built where the original parish church had been. On June 14, 1846, the town of Sonoma was taken over by American settlers who declared a "California Republic." General Vallejo was taken prisoner and the Bear Flag was raised. The Bear Flag flew over Sonoma until July 9, 1846, when California became part of USA.

=== Sub-missions also lost ===
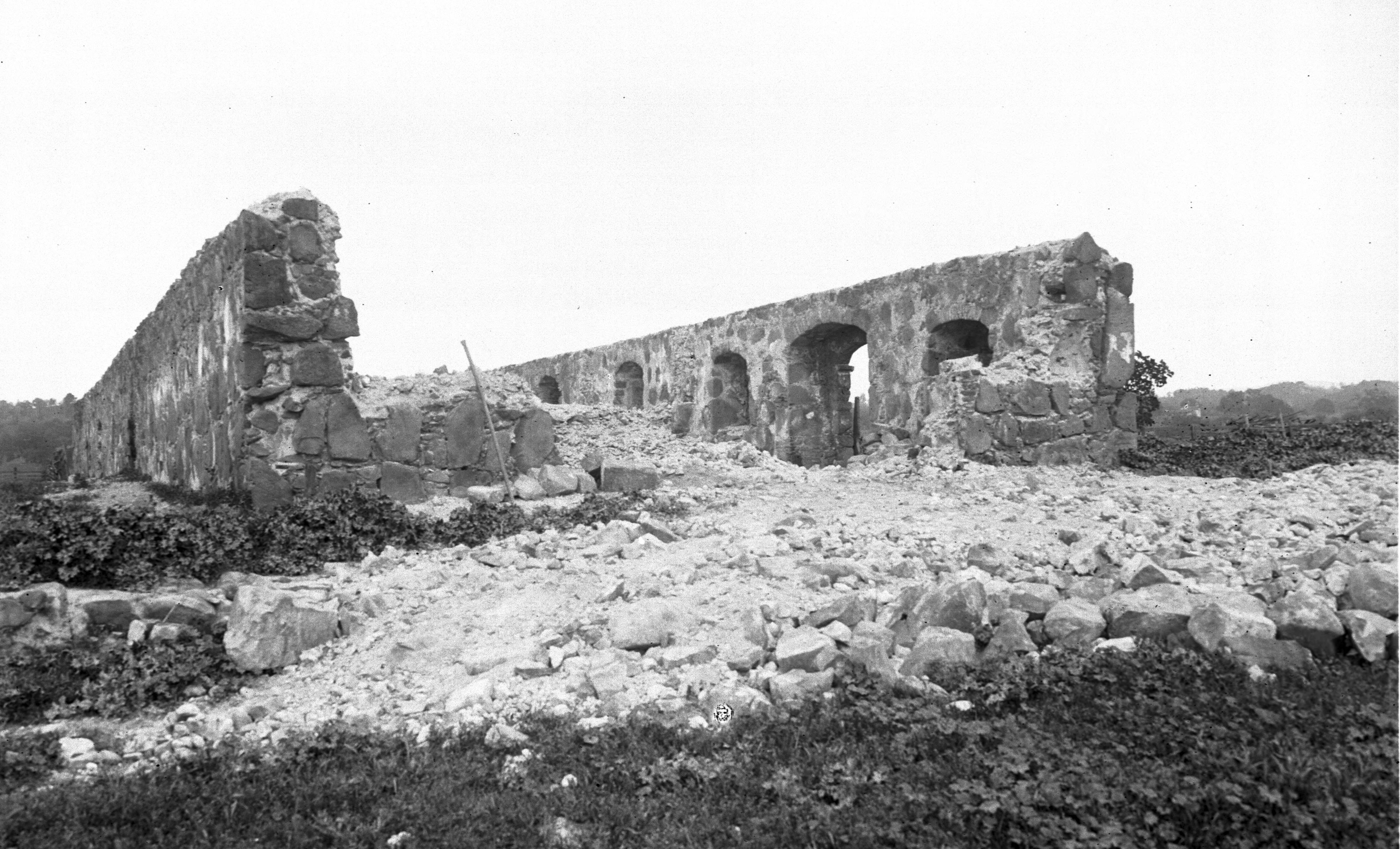
Ruins of the walls of Sub Mission Santa Margarita in 1906

In addition to the 21 main missions, there were "sub-missions" to serve as a rest stop for those travelling the El Camino Real road connecting the missions. These small sub-missions were also lost:

Santa Ysabel Asistencia was turned into Rancho Santa Ysabel (Ortega). The church turned into ruins. Three acres of the original compound was returned to the Church. The cornerstone for a new, Mission Revival Style chapel was laid on September 14, 1924.

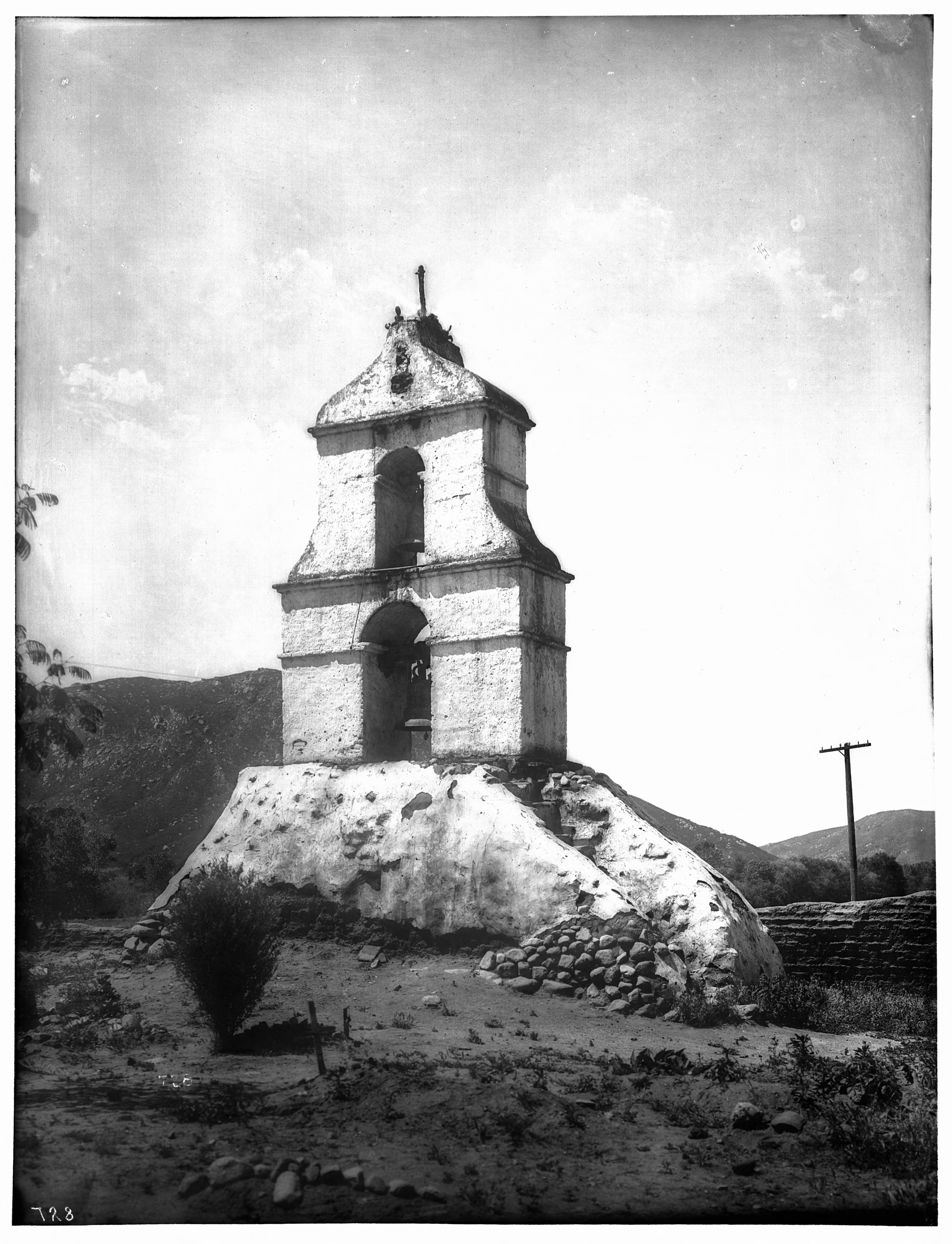
Rear of bell tower at Mission Asistencia of San Antonio at Pala, c.1888-1903

San Antonio de Pala Asistencia and Las Flores Estancia Pico sold off all of the holdings to Antonio J. Cot and José A. Pico on May 18, 1846. The church remained open. But on Christmas Day 1899, the San Jacinto Earthquake shook the Pala Valley, causing the roof over the church sanctuary to collapse. In 1902, a group named the "Landmarks Club of Southern California", under the direction of American journalist, historian, and photographer Charles Fletcher Lummis, purchased Pala Mission. The following year, the Club returned ownership to the Catholic Church and "saved the Chapel and a few rooms from complete ruin with a timely work of partial restoration."

Santa Margarita de Cortona Asistencia was sold to Rancho Santa Margarita; a few ruins are still on the private property of the Santa Margarita Ranch.

San Pedro y San Pablo Asistencia was sold to Rancho San Pedro (Sanchez); today, little remains. There is a plaque in Sanchez Adobe Park that shows the former Asistencia's floor plan.

San Bernardino de Sena Estancia, sold to Rancho San Bernardino, is today called "Asistencia" and operated as a branch of the San Bernardino County Museum.

Diego Sepúlveda Adobe, sold to Rancho Santiago de Santa Ana, is now a local history museum, operated by the Costa Mesa Historical Society.

Las Flores Estancia was sold to Rancho Santa Margarita y Las Flores. All original buildings are gone after years of neglect. The current Las Flores Adobe was built in 1865 by Marco Forster.

Nuestra Señora Reina de los Ángeles Asistencia was a sub-mission opened by the San Gabriel Mission to serve the new settlers in the new El Pueblo de Nuesta Señora Reina de los Ángeles. As the town grew it built its own parish church which is today known as the Old Plaza Church, then called La Iglesia de Nuestra Señora la Reina de los Ángeles. With Mexican secularization, the Ángeles Asistencia came in disuse and neglect. There is little physical record of the Ángeles Asistencia remaining today.

The local populations increasingly resented the appointed California governors sent from distant Mexico City, who came with little knowledge of local conditions and concerns. The friction came to a head in 1836, when Monterey-born Juan Bautista Alvarado led a revolt and seized the governorship from Nicolás Gutiérrez. Alvarado's actions began a period of de facto home rule, in which the weak and fractious central government was forced to allow more autonomy in its most distant department. Other local governors followed, including Carlos Antonio Carrillo, Alvarado himself for a second time, and Pío Pico. The last non-Californian governor, Manuel Micheltorena, was driven out after another rebellion in 1845. Micheltorena was replaced by Pío Pico, last Mexican governor of California, who served until 1846.

== Rancho period ==
It was not until the California Mexican era (1821–1846) that the titles to the plots of land were granted to individuals. California, now under the control of the Mexican government, opened up petitions for land grants. By 1828, the rules for establishing land grants were codified in the Mexican Reglamento (Regulation). The acts broke the large landholding of the missions and paved the way for attracting more settlers to California by making land grants easier to obtain. The procedure included a diseño – a hand-drawn topological map – to define the area. The Mexican governors of Alta California gained the power to grant state lands, and many of the Spanish concessions were subsequently patented under Mexican law – frequently to local "friends" of the governor. A commissioner would oversee the mission's crops and herds, while the land was divided up as communal pasture, a town plot, and individual plots for each Indian family. Without the control enforced by the Franciscan friars and the troops preventing them from leaving, the Mission Indians soon abandoned the fields (even if granted) and joined other interior tribes, or sought work on the new ranchos and expanding pueblos.

The number of Mexican land grants greatly increased after the secularization of the missions in 1834. Although the original intent of the secularization legislation was to have the property divided among former surviving Mission Indians, most of the grants were made to local Californios (See: List of Ranchos of California). A small number of Indians did receive land grants in the 1840s, but all were lost by the 1850s.

== Statehood ==
The United States (US) declared war against Mexico on May 13, 1846. Military action in California began with the Bear Flag Revolt on June 15, 1846. On July 7, 1846, US forces took possession of Monterey, the capital of California, and terminated the authority and jurisdiction of Mexican officials that day. Armed resistance ended in California with the Treaty of Cahuenga signed on January 13, 1847. The Treaty of Guadalupe Hidalgo, ending the war, was signed February 2, 1848, and California became a territory of the United States. The treaty gave residents one year to choose whether they wanted American or Mexican citizenship; over 90% chose American citizenship, which included full US voting rights. The other 10% returned to Mexico (where they received land), or in some cases in New Mexico were allowed to remain in place as Mexican citizens.

Between 1847 and 1849, California was run by the U.S. military. A constitutional convention met in Monterey in September 1849, and set up a state government. It operated for 10 months before California was admitted to the Union as the 31st State by Congress as part of the Compromise of 1850, enacted on September 9, 1850.

The Treaty of Guadalupe Hidalgo provided that the Mexican land grants would be honored. In order to investigate and confirm titles in California, American officials acquired the provincial records of the Spanish and Mexican governments in Monterey.

In 1851 the United States Congress passed "An Act to Ascertain and Settle Private Land Claims in the State of California", sponsored by California Senator William M. Gwin,. The Act required all holders of Spanish and Mexican land grants to present their titles for confirmation before the Board of California Land Commissioners. Contrary to the Treaty of Guadalupe Hidalgo, this Act placed the burden of proof of title on landholders. In many cases, the land grants had been made without clearly defining the exact boundaries. Even in cases where the boundaries were more specific, many markers had been destroyed before accurate surveys could be made. Aside from indefinite survey lines, the Land Commission had to determine whether the grantees had fulfilled the requirements of the Mexican colonization laws. While the Land Commission confirmed 604 of the 813 claims it reviewed, most decisions were appealed to US District Court and some to the Supreme Court. The confirmation process required lawyers, translators, and surveyors, and took an average of 17 years (with American Civil War, 1861–1865) to resolve. It proved expensive for landholders to defend their titles through the court system. In many cases, they had to sell their land to pay for defense fees or gave attorneys land in lieu of payment.

Land from titles not confirmed became part of the public domain and available for homesteaders who could claim up to 160-acre (0.65 km^{2}) plots in accordance with federal homestead law. Rejected land claims resulted in claimants, squatters, and settlers pressing Congress to change the rules. Under the Preemption Act of 1841, owners were able to "preempt" their portions of the grant, and acquire title for $1.25 an acre up to a maximum of 160 acres (0.65 km^{2}). Beginning with Rancho Suscol in 1863, special acts of Congress were passed that allowed certain claimants to preempt their land without regard to acreage. By 1866 this privilege was extended to all owners of rejected claims.

== Abraham Lincoln and the return of ownership ==
In 1853, Bishop Joseph Alemany began petitioning the US Public Land Commission to have the Church get back some of its land and building ownership. Alemany asked for the return of the church chapel, clergy residence, cemetery, orchard, and vineyard to the Catholic Church. After reading a letter from Alemany, President Abraham Lincoln signed a proclamation on March 18, 1865, just three weeks before his assassination, that restored ownership of some of the mission property to the Roman Catholic Church. Patents for each mission were issued to Archbishop J.S. Alemany based on his claim filed with the Public Land Commission on February 19, 1853. In all 1,051.44 acres (4.2550 km^{2}) of mission land was returned.

The government also returned Cañada de los Pinos (or College Rancho) in Santa Barbara County comprising 35,499.73 acres (143.6623 km^{2}), and La Laguna in San Luis Obispo County, consisting of 4,157.02 acres (16.8229 km^{2}). While the land returned was only a small portion of the land lost, each mission had its main building and courtyard returned.

When the missions were granted back to the Church, almost all were in ruins, and restoration of the old mission buildings started. Abraham Lincoln had hoped to visit California, a desire that he did not get to enjoy. The Church was overwhelmed at the state of ruin many of the mission churches were in. The Church was not able to start the repair and do maintenance on all the 21 missions, so some missions continued their decline till restoration could be started. Most buildings were made of sun-dried adobe bricks, without a good roof, so rain would quickly turn the adobe back to mud. The historical importance of the missions was slowly recognized by a number of restoration groups and the chain of missions continues restoration activities to this day.

== Current status ==
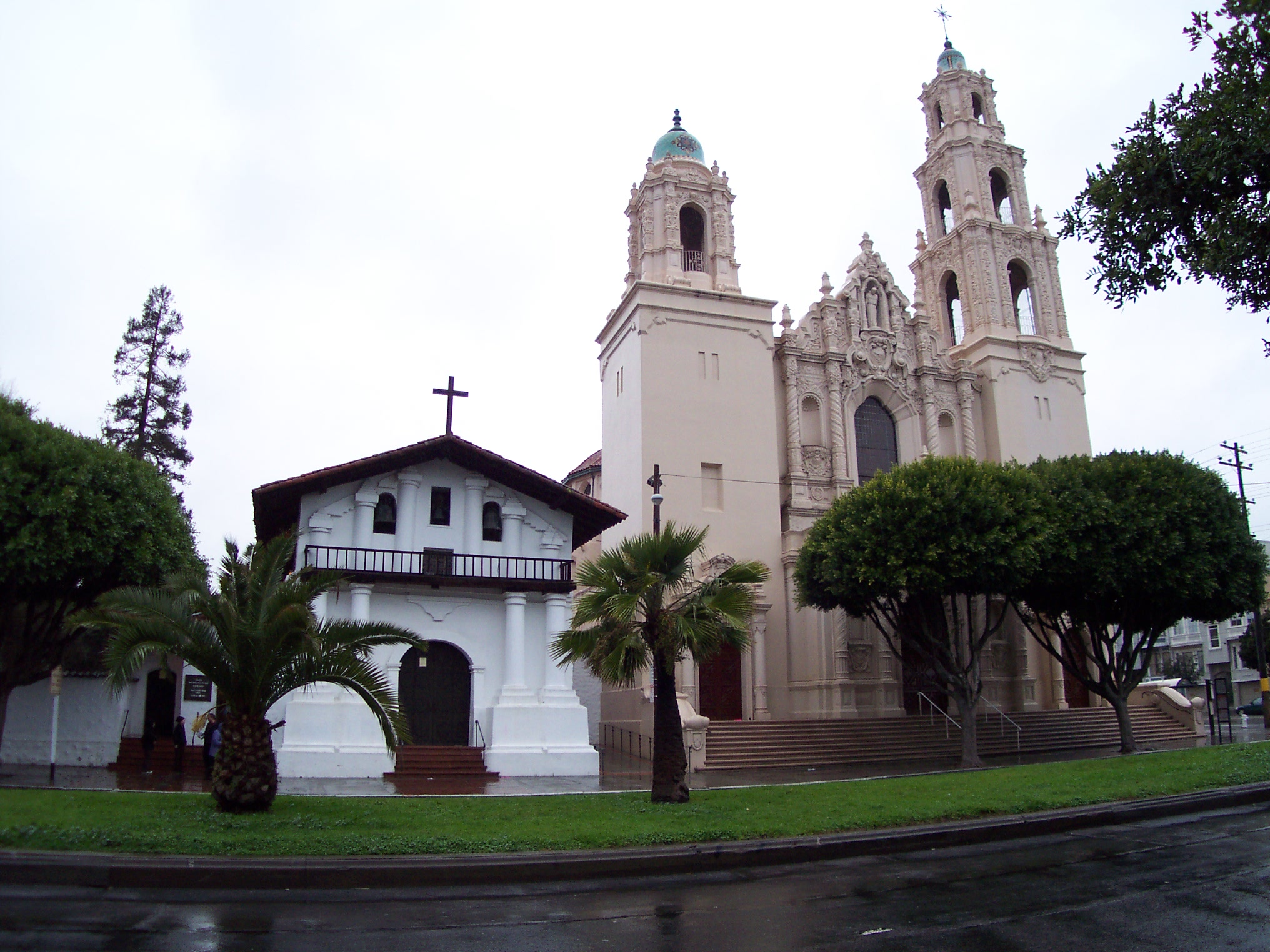
The original Mission San Francisco de Asís adobe structure is the smaller building at left, while the larger structure is a basilica completed in 1918 (the architectural style was influenced by designs exhibited at San Diego's Panama-California Exposition in 1915).

Only two buildings survived intact in the chain of 21 Missions started by Father Serra. The chapel at Mission San Francisco de Asís, also called Mission Dolores, built in 1791, and the Mission San Juan Capistrano chapel, the oldest building in California still in use, built in 1782.

The missions were restored using photos, painting, drawings and remains of building walls and foundations.

Pueblos sprang up around each of the 21 missions with the exception of one, Mission San Antonio de Padua. Mexican Governor Pío Pico declared all mission buildings in Alta California for sale, but no one bid for Mission San Antonio. The mission is currently surrounded by the Fort Hunter Liggett Military Reservation, which was acquired by the U.S. Army from the Hearst family during World War II to train troops. Additional land was acquired from the Army in 1950 to increase the mission area to over 85 acres (340,000 m^{2}). The fort is still actively training troops today and surrounds the mission. This is the only mission where one can see some surrounding mission support artifacts.

== See also ==
- Lists of Spanish colonial missions of the Roman Catholic Church in the Americas

On California history:

- Juan Bautista de Anza National Historic Trail
- History of California through 1899
- History of the west coast of North America

On general missionary history:

- Catholic Church and the Age of Discovery
- History of Christian Missions
- Missionary

On colonial Spanish American history:

- Spanish colonization of the Americas
- Indian Reductions
- California mission clash of cultures
- Native Americans in the United States

Historical fictional:

- Zorro, a fictional character set in the corrupt time of just before Mexican secularization.
