= Marine =

Marine or marines may refer to:

== Arts and entertainment ==
- Marine, a character in Sonic Rush Adventure
- "The Marines", in Aqua Teen Hunger Force season 5
- Marine: A Guided Tour of a Marine Expeditionary Unit, a 1996 book by Tom Clancy
- The Marine (film series)
  - The Marine, 2006
- Marines (film), 2003 American film
- Marine!, 1975 tactical board wargame

== Military ==
- Marines, a naval-based infantry force
- "Marine" also means 'navy' in several languages

== People ==
- Marine (given name)
- David Marine (1888–1976), American pathologist
- Jean-Christophe Marine (born 1968), Belgian molecular biologist
- Joseph E. Marine (1905–1998), New York state senator
- Eulalia Pérez de Guillén Mariné (1766–1878)
- Jordi Font Mariné (born 1955), Andorran politician
- Jorge Mariné (1941–2025), Spanish cyclist
- Oscar Mariné (born 1951), Spanish illustrator, typographer, and artist
- Jaime Mariné, Cuban baseball executive
- Adriana Marines (1991–1997), Mexican-American murder victim

== Places ==
- Marine, Illinois, United States
- Marine City, Michigan, United States
- Marine on St. Croix, Minnesota, United States
- Marine, West Virginia, United States
- Marines, Val-d'Oise, France
- Marines, Spain

== Shopping centres ==
- Marine Walk Shopping Centre, a neighbourhood shopping centre in eMdloti, South Africa

== Sports ==
- Marine A.F.C., an English football club
- Marines F.C. (Rwanda), a Rwandan football club
- Chiba Lotte Marines, a Japanese baseball team

== See also ==
- Maritime (disambiguation)
- Ocean
- Sea
- Marin (disambiguation)
- Marina (disambiguation)
- Marine 5 (disambiguation)
- Marine Drive (disambiguation)
- Marine Parade (disambiguation)
- Mariner (disambiguation)
- Marine Sniper
- Marini
- Marino (disambiguation)
- Marinha de Guerra (disambiguation)
- Merchant navy, or merchant marine
- Space Marine, in science fiction
- Submarine
