= Mariner (surname) =

Mariner is a surname. Notable people with the name include:

- Deine Mariner, rugby league footballer
- Edward Mariner (1877–1949), English cricketer
- Paul Mariner (1953–2021), English football coach and retired player
- Rosemary Bryant Mariner (1953–2019), United States Naval Aviator
- Sandra Mariner (born 1974), Austrian track luger
- Wendy Mariner, Professor of Health Law, Bioethics & Human Rights at Boston University School of Public Health
- William Mariner (VC) (1882–1916), English soldier awarded the Victoria Cross during the First World War
- William Mariner (writer) (1791–1853), Englishman who wrote about the Polynesian island kingdom of Tonga

== See also ==
- Mariner (disambiguation)
- Marriner
- Marner
