= Marina (disambiguation) =

A marina is a place for docking pleasure boats.

Marina may also refer to:

== Places ==
=== Italy ===
- Bova Marina
- Cirò Marina
- Isca Marina
- Marciana Marina
- Marina di Bibbona
- Marina di Camerota
- Marina di Campo
  - Marina di Campo Airport
- Marina di Casalvelino
- Marina di Castagneto Carducci
- Marina di Carrara
- Marina di Cecina
- Marina di Gioiosa Ionica
- Marina di Grosseto
- Marina di Massa
- Marina di Pietrasanta
- Marina di Pisa
- Marina di Posada
- Marina di Ragusa
- Marina di Scilla
- Rio Marina
- Sellia Marina
- Vibo Marina

=== United States ===
- Marina, California, a small city on the central coast of California
- Marina, San Diego, California, a neighborhood in San Diego
- Marina Club, a neighborhood in Tampa, Florida
- Marina del Rey, California, a small town on the coast of southern California, near Los Angeles
- Marina District, San Francisco, California

=== Elsewhere ===
- Marina Bay, Singapore
- Marina Square, a shopping mall in Singapore
- Marina Alta, a comarca in the province of Alicante, Spain
- Marina Baixa (Spanish: Marina Baja), a comarca in the province of Alicante, Spain
- Marina, Croatia, a municipality and tourist town on the Adriatic
- Marina, Egypt, a Mediterranean beach and resort village
- Marina, Estonia, a village in Saarde Parish, Pärnu County, Estonia
- 1202 Marina, an asteroid
- Marina Beach, a beach in Chennai, India
- Marina Beach, a coastal village in KwaZulu-Natal, South Africa
- Marina Point, a low rocky point of Galindez Island, Antarctica
- Dubai Marina, a place in Dubai

== People ==
- Marina (given name), including a list of people with the name

=== Mononym ===
- Marina Diamandis (born 1985), Welsh singer-songwriter known as Marina
- Marina (Japanese singer) (born 1987), real name Marina Nakamura
- Marina (Polish singer) (born 1989), stylised as MaRina, real name Marina Łuczenko-Szczęsna

=== Surname ===
- Alcide Marina (1887–1950), Catholic educator and Vatican diplomat
- Alfonso Marina, American soccer player
- Anya Marina (born 1976), American singer and songwriter
- Imca Marina (born 1941), Dutch pop singer and writer
- Justinian Marina (1901–1977), Romanian Orthodox prelate
- Roberto Marina (born 1961), Spanish football player

=== Spanish surname variants ===
- Fernando de Andrade de las Mariñas (1477–1549), Galician nobleman and military commander
- Luis Mariñas (1947–2010), Spanish journalist

== Arts, entertainment, and media ==
=== Films ===
- Marina (1945 film), a 1945 Mexican comedy film
- Marina (1960 film), a 1960 German musical film
- Marina (2012 film), a 2012 Indian Tamil-language film
- Marina (2013 film), a 2013 Flemish film about the Belgian artist Rocco Granata

=== Television ===
- Marina (1974 TV series), a Mexican telenovela
- Marina (2004 TV series), a Philippine TV series
- Marina (2006 TV series), a Spanish-language TV series

=== Other arts, entertainment, and media ===
- "Marina" (song), a 1959 song by Rocco Granata
- "Marína", a 19th-century poem by Slovak author Andrej Sládkovič (Andrej Braxatoris)
- Marina Records, a record label
- Marina (novel), a 1999 young adult fiction novel by Carlos Ruiz Zafón
- "Marina", a song by +/- from Xs on Your Eyes, 2008
- Marina, an octopus villager in the video game series Animal Crossing

== Biology ==
- Marina (plant), a genus of legumes
- Blechnum penna-marina (the pinque), a fern species from Chile and Argentina

== Brands and enterprises ==
- Morris Marina, a British car
- Marina Hotel, a former hotel/casino in Las Vegas

== Maritime ==
- Marina (ship), a number of ships
- "Marina" means "navy" in Italian and Spanish:
  - Marina de Guerra Revolucionaria, the Cuban Navy
  - Marina de guerra de Guinea Ecuatorial, the Equatoguinean Navy
  - Marina Militare, the Italian Navy
    - Real Marina (Kingdom of the Two Sicilies)
    - Marina Nazionale Repubblicana, Navy of the Italian Social Republic (1943–1945)
  - Marina de Guerra del Peru, the Peruvian Navy
  - Marina de Guerra de la República Española, the former Spanish Republican Navy (1931–1939)

== Other uses ==
- MARINA, an NSA database
- Maritime Industry Authority (Philippines), abbreviated as MARINA

== See also ==
- Marine (disambiguation)
- Mariner (disambiguation)
- Marines
- Marina Bay (disambiguation)
- Marinha de Guerra (disambiguation)
