= Merner =

Merner is a surname. Notable people with the surname include:

- Carl Johan Merner (born 1975), Swedish film producer
- Jonathan Joseph Merner (1864–1929), Canadian politician
- Samuel Merner (1823–1908), Canadian businessman and politician

== See also ==
- Marner
