= Marinha de Guerra =

Marinha de Guerra (Portuguese for navy) may refer to:

- The Angolan Navy (Marinha de Guerra)
- The Bissau-Guinean Navy (Marinha Nacional Popular)
- The Brazilian Navy (Marinha do Brasil)
- The Mozambique Navy (Marinha de Guerra de Moçambique)
- The Portuguese Navy (Marinha de Guerra Portuguesa)

== See also ==
- Marina (disambiguation)
- Marine (disambiguation)
- Mariner (disambiguation)
- Marines
- Armada (disambiguation)
