= El Molino Viejo =

Former grist mill in San Marino, California

- U.S. National Register of Historic Places
- California Historical Landmark No. 302
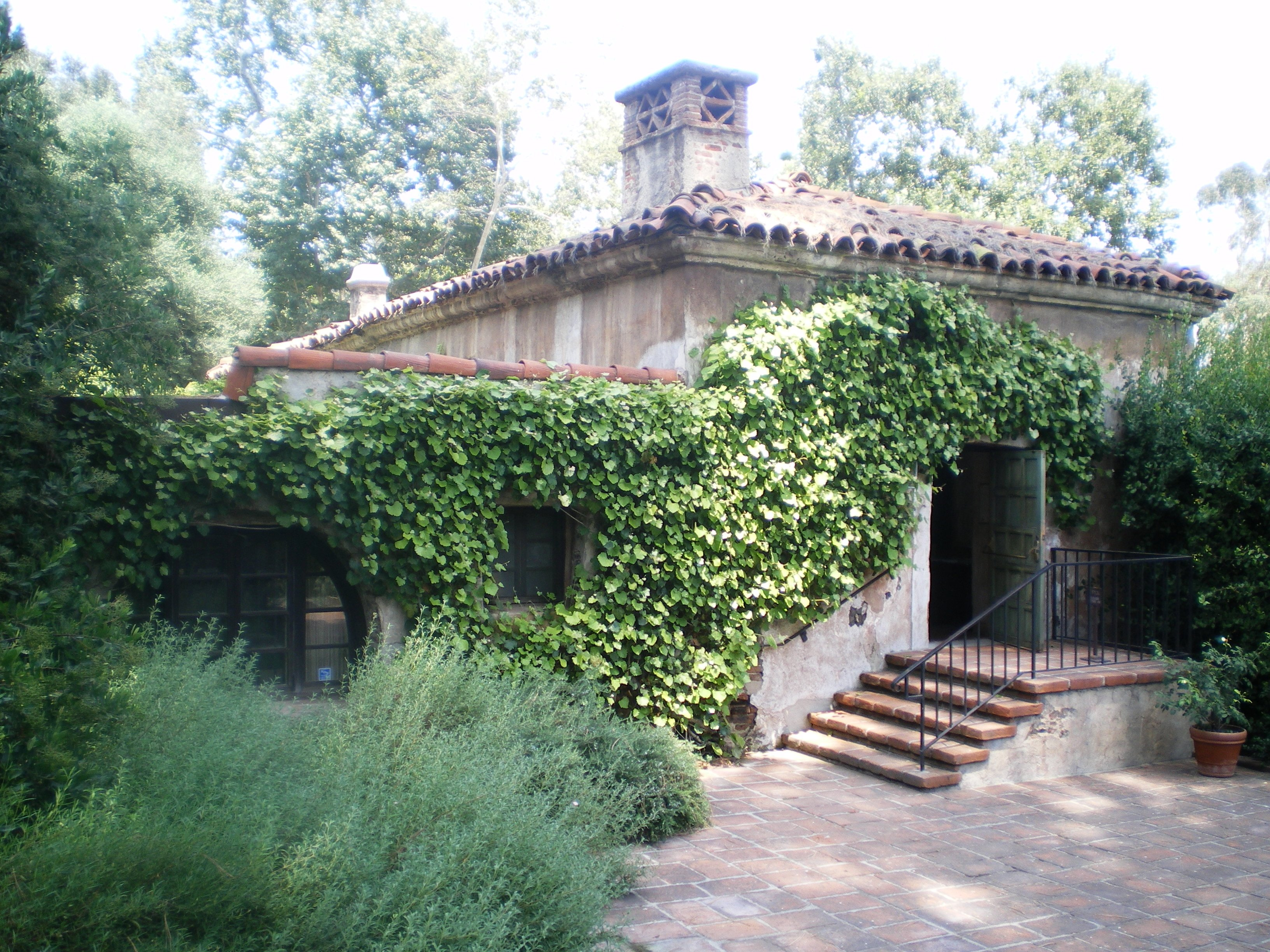
- El Molino Viejo, July 2008

- Location within the Los Angeles metropolitan area Location within California Location within the United States
- Location: 1120 Old Mill Rd., San Marino, California, United States
- Coordinates: 34°07′08″N 118°07′41″W
- Built: 1816
- Architect: José Maria de Zalvidea
- Architectural style: Colonial
- NRHP reference No.: 71000154
- CHISL No.: 302
- Added to NRHP: May 6, 1971

El Molino Viejo, also known as The Old Mill, is a former grist mill in the San Rafael Hills of present-day San Marino, California, United States, and was built in 1816 by Father José María de Zalvidea from the Mission San Gabriel Arcángel (San Gabriel Mission). It is the oldest commercial building in Southern California, and was one of the first ten sites in Los Angeles County to be listed on the National Register of Historic Places, receiving the recognition in 1971. The Old Mill has also been designated as a California Historical Landmark.

== Construction and operation as a grist mill ==
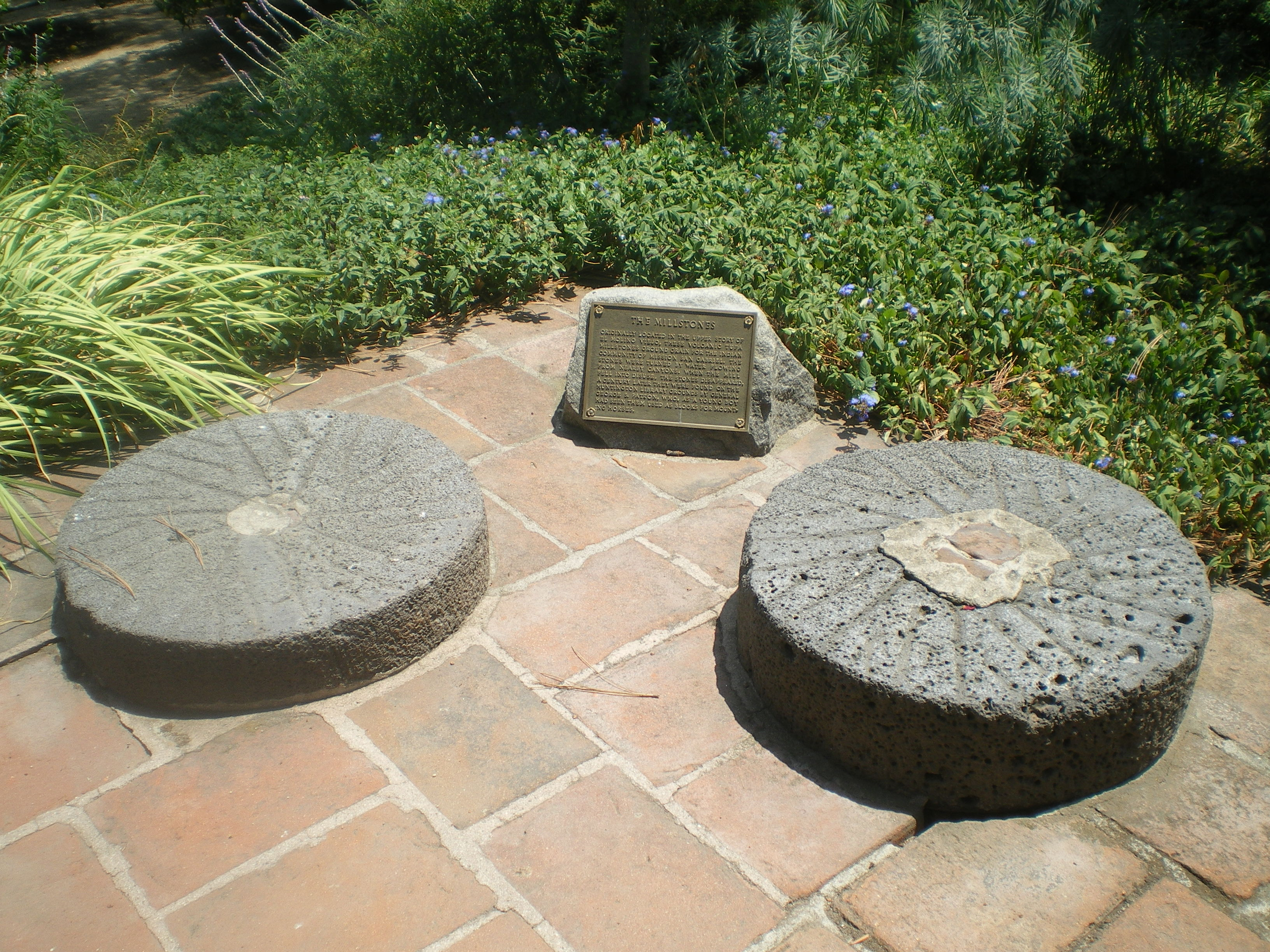
The original millstones were discovered on the grounds of the Huntington Library by Gen. George S. Patton.

Though there are varying accounts of the exact date, San Gabriel Mission records indicate it was built in 1816. The mill was built on land owned by the San Gabriel Mission, and was designed by Franciscan Father José Maria de Zalvidea, then in charge of the mission. It was built by Tongvan Mission Indian laborers under the supervision of Father Zalvidea.

The mill was built like a fortress. Its lower walls are nearly five feet thick at the base, and are made of brick and volcanic tuff. Some have written that the thick fortress-like walls were intended to allow the padres to barricade themselves in the event of "a disturbance among their somewhat uncertain converts." The upper walls are made of sun-dried adobe slabs, and the building's surface is covered with a lime mortar made from burnt sea shells. The pine and sycamore beams are tied with leather thongs, and the structure is also supported by large buttresses which can still be seen on building's exterior corners.

Water was brought to the mill in an open ditch (zanja) from Los Robles and Kewen Canyons, and stored in a large cistern. For the mill itself, Father Zalvidea designed an unusual horizontal, direct impulse water wheel. There were three vaulted water chambers on the ground floor and a single horizontal water wheel. The water wheel was attached to a vertical shaft that went up to the second level (the current entrance room) where the grinding stones were located. One of the grinding stones was attached to the shaft, and rotated along with the water wheel. A second stone was placed above the rotating stone, with corn and grain between the stones. It is suspected that the force of the water from the cistern was not sufficient to start the wheel turning with the required force, and that a leather thong was wrapped around the shaft and pulled by Indians to start the wheel. The upper-most room, used now as an art gallery, was used for storage of the final product. After the water flowed out of the mill, it was channeled into Wilson Lake down hill from the mill. The lake was drained in the mid-1920s and is now the site of San Marino's Lacy Park.

It was the first water-powered grist mill in Southern California, and some have called it the first grist mill in California. While some have called Father Zalvidea's horizontal design a "mechanical marvel, evolved and constructed by a mastermind," others considered the design flawed as it splashed moisture up the shaft, leaving the flour damp. The mill was operational for only seven years, during which time it provided food for the missionaries and Indian neophytes, there were 1,644 Tongva-Gabrieleños in 1816 (Population of Native California) in the mission community. In 1823, a New England–style mill with a vertical waterwheel was built adjacent to the mission. The new mill resulted in a superior product, and the old mill ceased operation.

== Subsequent uses as a residence and golfing clubhouse ==
=== Disputes over title ===
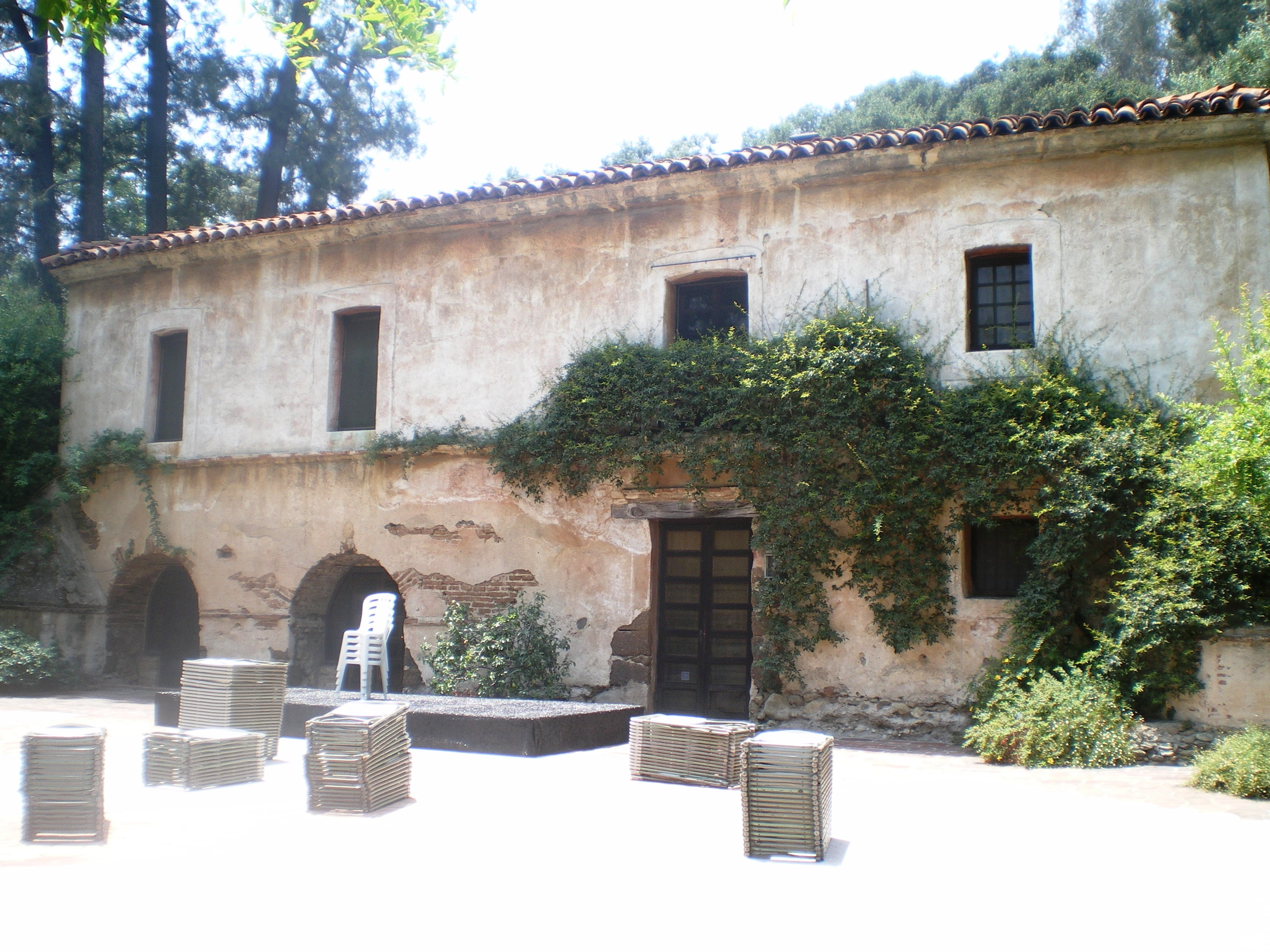
View of the Old Mill from rear courtyard

After the new mill was opened in 1823, the Old Mill reportedly sat idle for 30 years, during which time it was victimized by vandals and the weather. In 1846, Pío Pico – last Mexican governor of Alta California – sold 16,000 acres (65 km^{2}), including the mill, to Julian Workman and Hugo Reid (co-grantee of the adjacent Rancho Huerta de Cuati).

However, after the Mexican Cession of California to the U.S. in 1848, John C. Fremont refused to accept the validity of the transaction. With title to the land in a state of uncertainty, James S. Waite (publisher of The Star newspaper) established squatter's rights over 160 acres (0.65 km^{2}), including the Old Mill.

=== Occupancy by the Kewens ===
The property was subsequently sold to Dr. Thomas White for $500. In 1858, Dr. White conveyed the "Old Mill Site" to his daughter Fannie Kewen; she and her husband, Col. Edward J. C. Kewen, both lived there for 20 years. The Kewens added onto the building, installing French windows, a front portico, and a small plaza. Col. Kewen has been described as "old-time Southern gentleman" and "one of the most courteous and politely-polished men California has ever seen." There are many accounts of parties hosted by the Kewens at the Old Mill and of their "prodigal hospitality" and "gracious style of living". It was said that "the gallant and gay gathered from miles 'round, listened to the twanging of the guitar and the jolly click of the castenets, and through it all danced gay dances on the floors that once had echoed the quiet footfall of the priest." In 1879, the Kewens defaulted on a mortgage, and the property was foreclosed on by J. Edward Hollenbeck. Hollenbeck sold the property to Edward Leodore Mayberry, Sr. in 1881, who used the structure as housing for his ranch superintendent.

=== Occupancy by the Mayberrys ===
Edward Leodore Mayberry, Sr. left San Francisco where he was a builder (Grand Hotel, 1870 and Napa State Hospital, 1875) and settled in the Los Angeles area in 1879 where he began acquiring land eventually forming a 360 plus acre ranch in the heart of today's San Marino. He added El Molino Viejo to his ranch in 1881. By the mid 1890's Mrs. Mayberry (Emily Jane Gray) used the Old Mill as a retreat and to entertain artists. In 1895 she wrote El Molino Viejo, a fictional story of the landowner and Superintendent's sons finding a map to lost Spanish gold. The story was published in Charles Lummis' magazine, The Land of Sunshine, Volume 3, June to November 1895, pages 59-62. The Mayberry Ranch, including El Molino Viejo remained with the family until after the death of Mayberry Sr. in 1902.

=== Rediscovery in the late 19th century ===
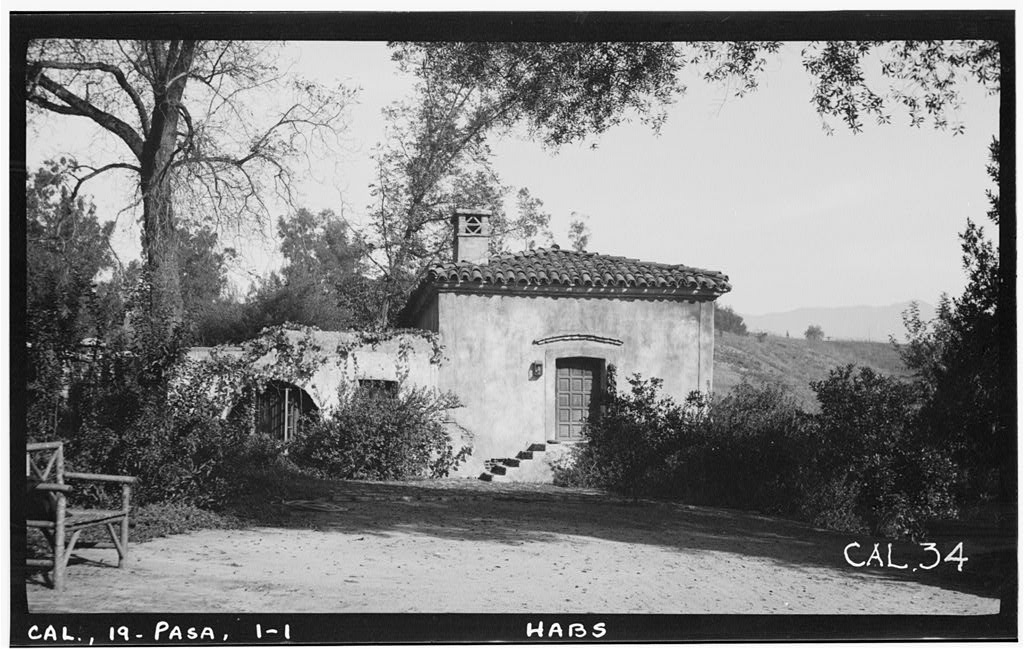
Photograph from the Historic American Buildings Survey

In 1898, Los Angeles Times reporter Topsy Tinkle wrote a lengthy article following a visit to El Molino Viejo. At that time, the mill was being used to store wine, causing the smell of wine to permeate the building, and as a sleeping place for hired men. Tinkle described the condition of the mill as follows:

The grinding-stones have gone, and also the machinery that in the romantic time of the old mission padres and their Indian neophytes, was wont to turn their corn into meal, and yet, in the material of the building itself, no sign of decay. The large oak beams, only ten inches apart, as sound as in the day the original trees lifted their leafy tops high in air. The cement of which the structure is made apparently defies time ... There are three wheel-houses, the arches of which have been bricked up, and the old millstones are at San Marino, J. De Barth Shorb's noted ranch near by, where they are used as stepping-stones. ... Padre and Indian have long gone to their rest, and the old mill is absolutely lifeless and deserted save many tiny chameleons that bask and sun themselves in the heated air ...

=== Acquisition and use by the Huntingtons ===
In 1903, the mill site was purchased by the Huntington Land and Improvement Company. When the Huntington Hotel opened in 1914 on the nearby hill, the land around the mill was turned into a golf course, with El Molino Viejo as the clubhouse. The land was later subdivided, leaving the Old Mill vacant.

=== Reconversion to residential use ===
In 1927, Leslie Huntington Brehm, the widow of Henry Huntington's son, and her husband took over the property, intending to preserve it. They hired Frederick H. Ruppel, a contractor who had restored the Mission San Juan Capistrano. Ruppel turned the mill into a home with modern amenities, but he made no structural change to the original walls. Ruppel also preserved and restored the old features, and where new materials were needed, he sought to maintain the old Mission-style appearance. The Brehms never moved into the Old Mill, instead renting it to a series of tenants, including the Doerr, McDuffy and Washburn families. From 1954 to 1963, the mill was leased to the Connell family who were its last occupants.

=== Current use as a museum and art gallery ===
When Mrs. Brehm died in 1962, the Old Mill was willed to the City of San Marino. The city has preserved the building and opened it to the public as a museum and art gallery (California Art Club Gallery), operated first by the California Historical Society and later by the Old Mill Foundation. The museum is open Tuesday through Sunday from 1 p.m. to 4 p.m. A model showing how the mill operated is located on the ground floor of the museum. While nothing remains of the waterwheel, two of the millstones (pictured above) are displayed in the garden area. The millstones were found more than a century after the mill closed on the grounds of the Huntington Library by General George S. Patton, who grew up in the area and recalled seeing them used as blocks for mounting horses. There is also a 16th-century volcanic rock fountain in the patio to the east of the mill. The fountain was acquired in Mexico by Mrs. Brehm's daughter, Mrs. Albert Doerr.

== Legend of Catalina ==
In his 1898 publication, Topsy Tinkle recounted a story that the Indians told about a natural spring located on the site of the Old Mill. The story told of a 16-year-old Indian named Catalina with "thick, jet-black hair" and "big, melting black eyes." Catalina lived in the time of the San Gabriel Mission and gave roses to the Virgin Mary in hopes that she could win the heart of the handsome José, even hoping that "something dreadful" would happen to another girl of whom José was fond. When José left for two years serving on a ship, Catalina turned her back on the Virgin, and Catalina began praying to the old "Mexican god", described as a "hideous clay image". Catalina died of sorrow when José did not return, and her body was buried on the spot where the mill was later built, a spot from which a natural flow of spring water "slowly oozes". According to the legend, oozing spring water is "only the tears from a loving woman's broken heart."

== Historic designations ==
As the oldest commercial building in Southern California, El Molino Viejo has been recognized as a historic site at the state and national levels. In 1937, it was documented by the Historic American Buildings Survey. It was one of the first ten sites in Los Angeles County to be listed in the National Register of Historic Places, receiving the recognition in 1971. It has also been designated as a California Historical Landmark (No. 302) that reads:

- NO. 302 OLD MILL – The Old Mill, El Molino Viejo, was designed by Father José María Zalvidea and built of fired bricks and adobe about 1816 to serve Mission San Gabriel. Another grist mill was built in 1823 near the mission and the old mill was gradually abandoned – it passed from mission control in 1846. The property remained in private hands until 1903, when Henry E. Huntington bought the building and used it for a golf clubhouse. Later owners, Mr. and Mrs. James Brehm, had the mill restored in 1928 by Frederick Rupple.

== See also ==
- List of Registered Historic Places in Los Angeles County, California
- List of California Historical Landmarks in Los Angeles County
- José Maria de Zalvidea
