= Marine 5 =

Marine 5 may refer to:

- Marine 5 (Rhode Island fireboat)
- The Marine 5: Battleground, a 2017 American film from The Marine franchise
