= Victoria Reid =

Tongva woman (d. 1868)

Victoria Reid (c. 1809 – December 23, 1868), also known as Bartolomea Comicrabit, was an Indigenous Tongva woman from the village of Comicranga, at what is now Santa Monica, California. She is notable for having been one of the few Indigenous people to be granted land by the Mexican Republic, and for having respected social status in Mexican California. She is also notable for her marriage as a widow to Hugo Reid, a Scottish immigrant who became a naturalized Mexican citizen. After her marriage to Reid, she was known as "Victoria", and referred to respectfully as Doña Victoria.

Bartolomea was taken as a child to Mission San Gabriel, where she was educated in Hispanic culture and converted to Christianity. At the age of 13, she entered into an arranged marriage with an Indigenous man. Later, as a widow, she married a Scots immigrant. She is believed to have inspired the lead character in Helen Hunt Jackson's novel Ramona (1884).

== Life ==
=== Early life ===
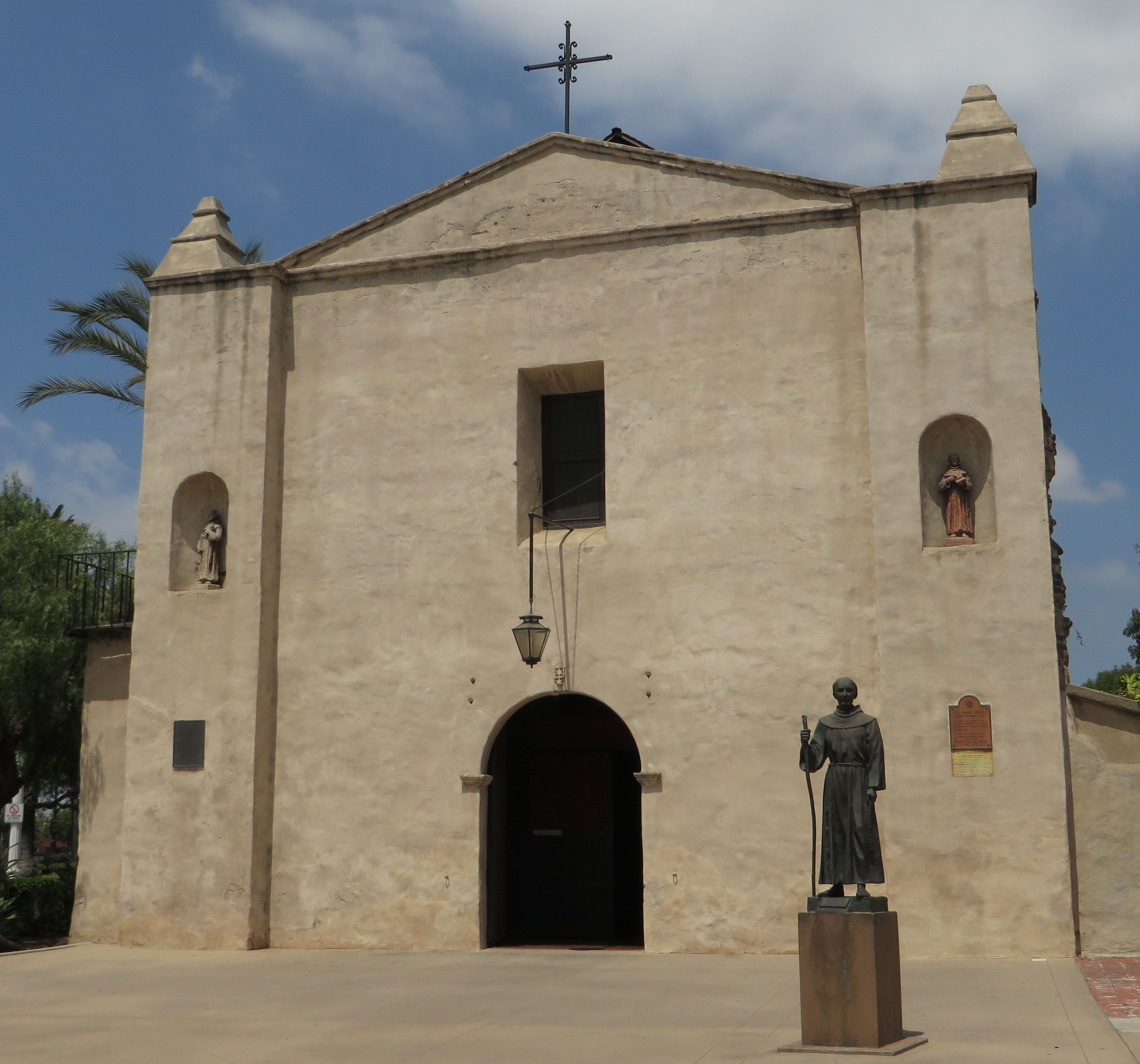
At the age of six, she was taken from her parents to Mission San Gabriel (pictured).

Bartolomea was born at Comicranga between 1808 and 1810 a daughter of the chief of the village and his wife.

At the age of six, Franciscan missionaries arranged to take her to live at Mission San Gabriel for conversion to Christianity. Girls lived in a guarded dormitory. These were known as monjeríos, where young girls, and single and widowed women, were kept in locked rooms to "safeguard their virginity and help them to prepare for Christian marriage."

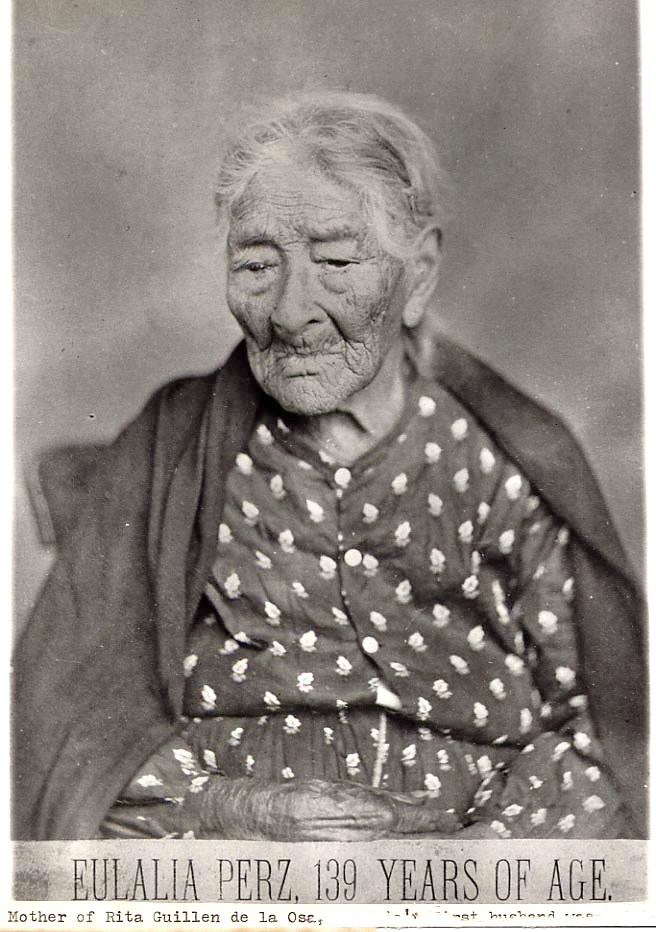
Eulalia Pérez de Guillén Mariné (pictured), keeper of the keys, chose Bartolomea as her assistant at the mission. Perez later supported Victoria Reid's land grant acquisition of the Huerta de Cuati.

Eulalia Pérez de Guillén Mariné, keeper of the keys at the mission, paid special attention by making Bartolomea her assistant at a young age.

=== First marriage ===
Bartolomea was kept at the mission until the age of 13. That year the mission fathers chose Pablo Maria, a 41-year-old Indigenous vaquero, to be her husband. He worked at the Yutucubit Rancheria for the mission. During the Spanish mission period, the Franciscan fathers encouraged recent converts to marry within the neophyte population in order to retain control over them and their children as a work force to be exploited for the mission.

In this marriage, Bartolomea bore four children, recorded as Felipe, Jose Delores, Maria Ygnacía, and Carlitos. Her first child, Felipe, was born in 1822, when she was 15 years old. By this time, Mexico had gained independence from Spain. The couple was rewarded two small plots of land known as parajes near the mission. In this way, the mission fathers acknowledged her to be Hispanicized and Christianized. She became a widow in 1836, when Pablo Maria died.

=== Marriage to Hugo Reid ===
At that time, the widowed Bartolomea gained control of the parajes. Deemed Hispanicized and Christianized, she was considered able to make her own marriage choice.

In September 1836, she married Hugo Reid, who had come to California in 1832 from Scotland. Reid was in the process of becoming a naturalized citizen of the Mexican Republic, and had changed his name to Don Perfecto Hugo Reid as part of this process. After they married, Bartolomea was known as Victoria Reid.

Hugo Reid's status in Mexico became elevated by "being the husband of Victoria, a connected mission Indian and well-respected" in the region. Reid adopted all four of Victoria's children, which was taken as evidence of his affection for her. With her marriage to Reid, she and her children were exempt from being officially classified as indios.

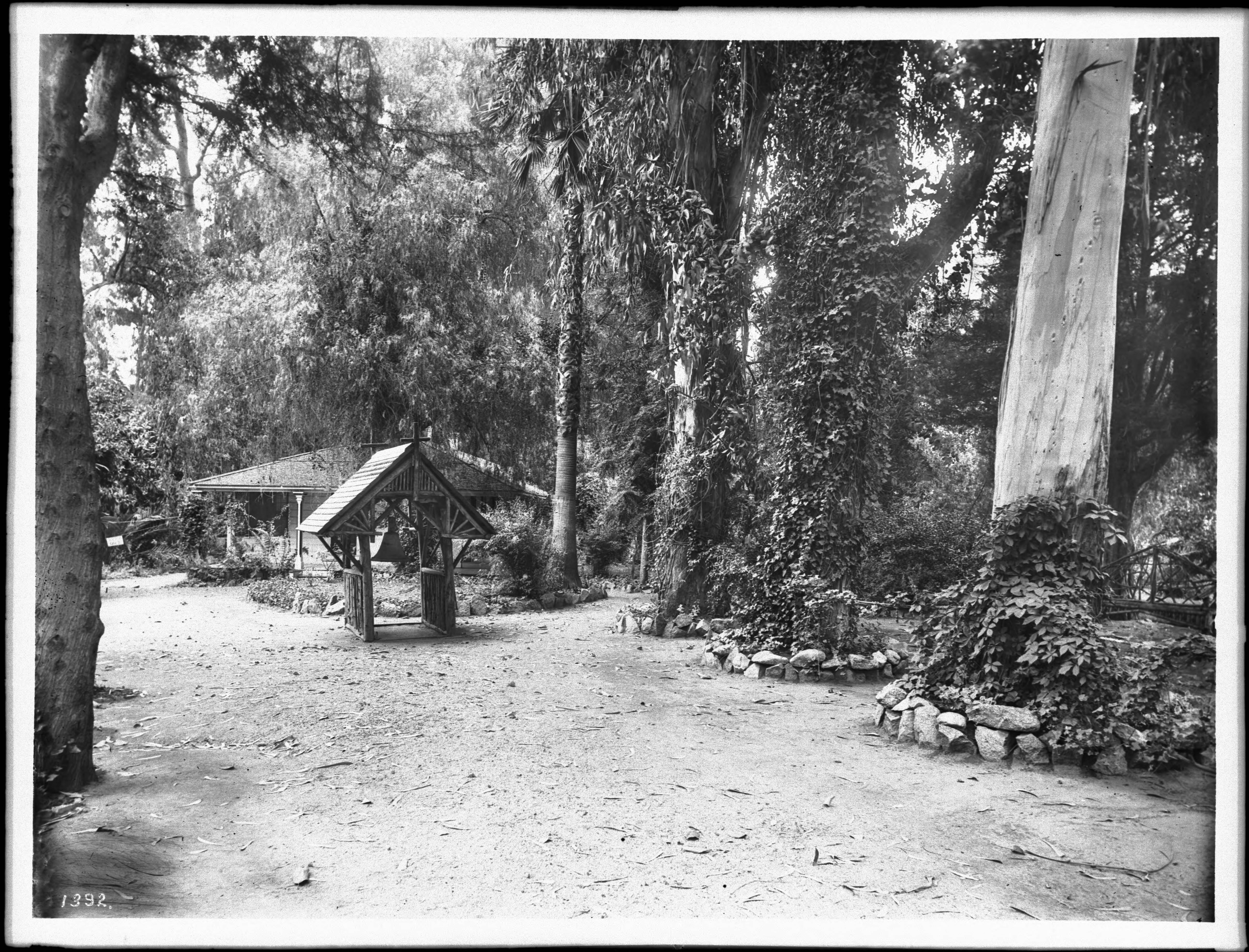
The Hugo Reid Adobe (c. 1900–1902), located at Rancho Santa Anita, primarily managed by Hugo

Eulalia Pérez de Guillén Mariné, who was influential at the mission, aided Victoria in 1838 in receiving a land grant, Huerta de Cuati, for her work at the mission. This was a 128.6-acre (52.0 ha) grant about 2 mi (3.2 km) northeast of the mission. This was noted as "one of the few Mexican grants given to an Indigenous person in southern California." The grant was given solely to her by name, as her husband Hugo Reid had not yet become a naturalized citizen of Mexico.

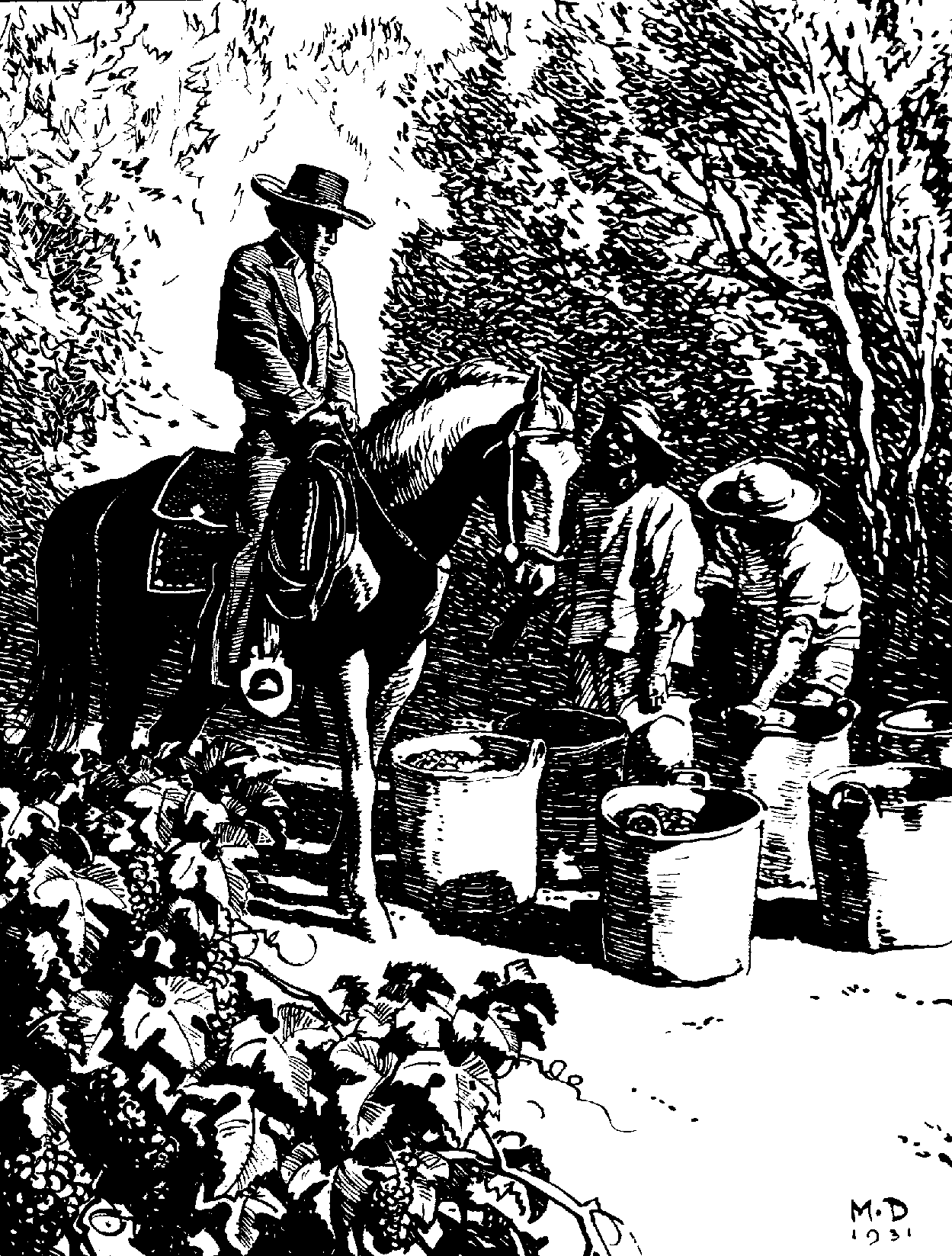
Depiction of husband Hugo Reid at Rancho Santa Anita

In 1839, Hugo's naturalized citizenship was complete. The family built the Hugo Reid Adobe. The adobe still stands today, although it has been modified. In the 1840s, Victoria managed Huerta de Cuati while her husband managed Rancho Santa Anita. With help from her son Felipe, Victoria oversaw expansion of the gardens and orchards on her land grant. There were 20,500 grapevines and 430 fruit and nut trees. She also managed the production of cakes of brown sugar and aguardiente, or liquor. Her land grant employed Indigenous workers. They were often paid with aguardiente rather than cash.

On August 18, 1843, her son Felipe married Maria de la Resureccion Ontiveros. She was a descendant of a landowning family in Los Angeles who had settled in the area with the first wave of Spanish colonization in California. This marriage indicated that Victoria Reid's children were moving up the social ladder in Mexican California.

In 1844, William Heath Davis visited the Reid household. He wrote that he was "surprised and delighted with the excellence and neatness of the housekeeping of the Indian wife [Victoria], which could not have been excelled. The beds which were furnished us to sleep in where exquisitely neat, with coverlet of satin, the sheets and pillowcases trimmed with lace and highly ornamented." Davis regularly spoke of his low opinions of Indigenous peoples, and this account shows that he viewed Victoria as an exception to this perspective.

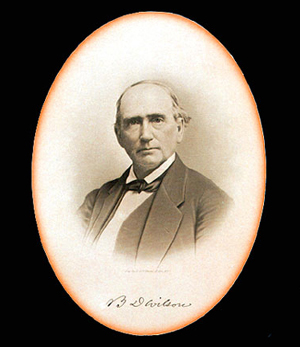
Benjamin Davis Wilson became a conservator of Victoria Reid after Hugo's death. Wilson signed away her land in a dubious manner, indicating Victoria had lost status as an Indigenous woman to control her property compared to her status in Mexican California.

After the transfer of Alta California to the United States and California statehood in 1848 and 1850 respectively, Anglo-Americans became the dominant class in the new settler colonial society. The influx of settlers resulted in changes in attitudes toward her marriage to Reid and to her status as a respected Indigenous woman. Interracial marriage was highly discouraged, and new migrants from outside the Southwest questioned why a white man would marry an "Indian squaw." Americans discounted Victoria Reid's status: "Whereas Victoria's land and economic contributions bolstered Hugo Reid's social status in the Mexican period, in the American period, Victoria's social status solidly rested on Hugo's protection and legitimacy."

When Maria Ygnacía, Victoria's daughter, was around 18 years old, she was admired for her beauty yet was mischaracterized as being "half-English, half-Indian," based on Hugo Reid's ancestry. One commentator suggested that Americans had to create psychological and social distance rather than accept that a "full-blooded Indian" was beautiful.

In 1851, Hugo Reid was in declining health. He published a series in the Los Angeles Star titled The Indians of Los Angeles County. Reid hoped his work would help gain him appointment as an Indian agent for the southern California district. He needed the salary but also wanted to advance the cause of the Indigenous peoples of the Los Angeles Basin, whom the Spanish had called Gabrieleños (they are not Tongva people). Benjamin Davis Wilson believed that Reid was a highly viable candidate because of his "opportunities of knowing the Indians perhaps exceeded those of any in the State."

At this time, Hugo had secretly revealed unhappiness in his marriage with Victoria. Hugo once copied a note which read "Any man who would cohabit with an Indian places himself on the level of brutes!" He titled this personal note "Anecdote of a Lawyer," which he kept with him for some time.

==== Declined status and loss of land ====
After Hugo Reid died in 1852, Victoria was left without his protection. As she was believed incapable of managing her affairs, the court assigned her a conservator, Benjamin Davis Wilson. She lost control of the property that she had acquired and greatly expanded during the Mexican era. In 1854, Wilson produced a deed to the Huerta de Cuati that claimed he paid Victoria US$8,000 (equivalent to about $286,670 in 2025) for the property. However, her signature was represented only with a symbol of a cross, although Victoria was a literate woman. In 1855, a court appointed Agustin Olvera to be Victoria's administrator "because the court considered her incompetent to arrange her own property."

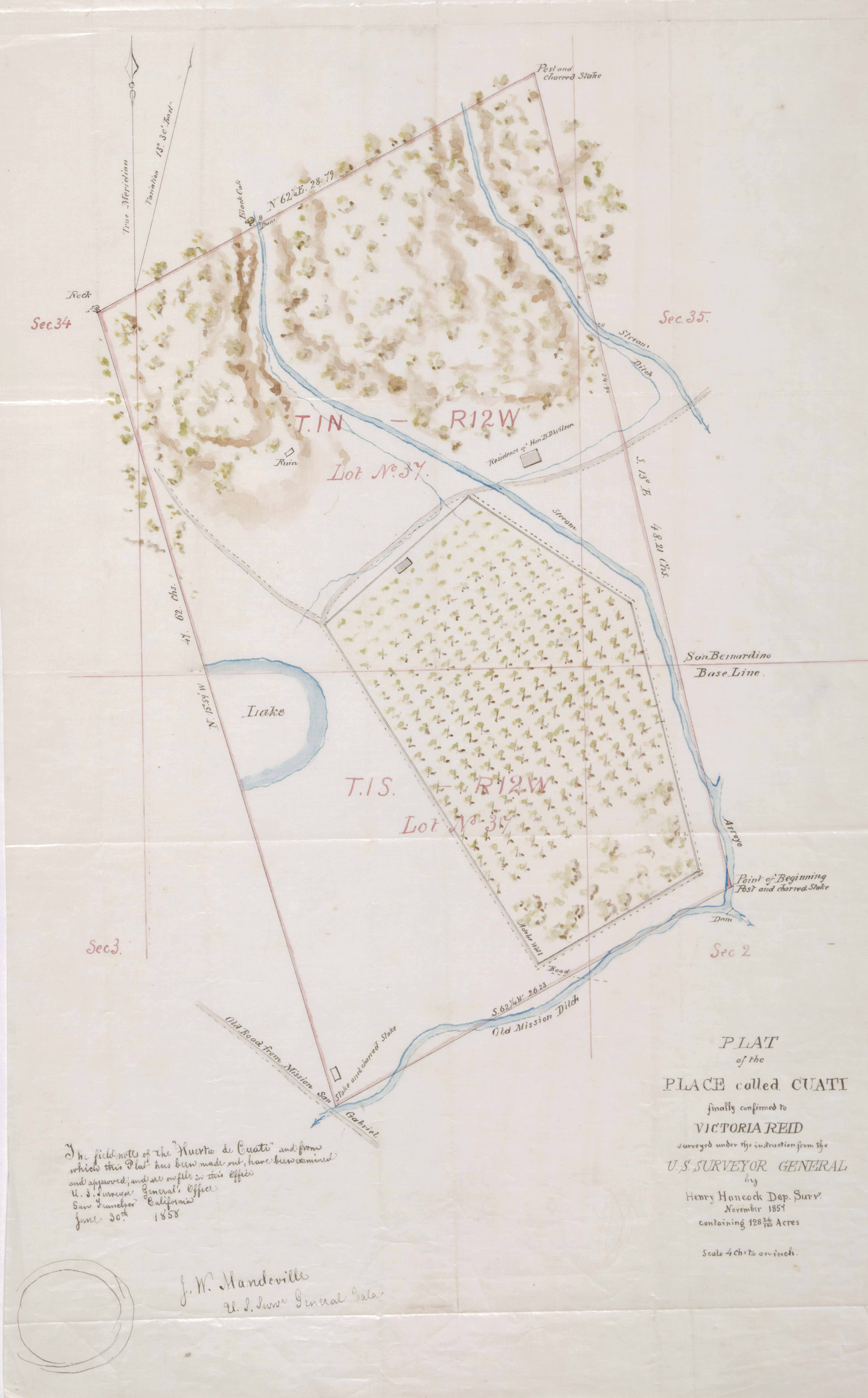
Henry Hancock's 1854 plat of the "place called Cauti finally confirmed to Victoria Reid" was approved in 1858; the map marks Residence of Hon. B.D. Wilson as a landmark.

=== End of life ===
Before her death, Victoria made one last visit to Laura Everston King, whom she had met with earlier in her life. King described Reid as wearing a common cotton cloth and wrapped in a quilt, attended to by a single Indigenous servant.

At the end of her life, Victoria lived again at the San Gabriel Mission. She died on December 23, 1868, from smallpox. She was buried in the cemetery of the mission.

== Legacy ==
Victoria Reid/Bartolomea is historically noted as one of the few Indigenous persons to be granted land following the secularization of the Missions by the First Mexican Republic. The support of Eulalia Pérez de Guillén Mariné was critical to her gaining this land grant.

Helen Hunt Jackson's novel Ramona (1884), in part a romantic myth about elite Californio society, used the Reid marriage as a motif. Jackson does not name Victoria and refers to her as an "Indian squaw." This flattened her complexity into a white American stereotype.
