= Comicranga =

Former Tongva village at Santa Monica, California

Comicranga was a coastal Tongva village located at what is now the area of Santa Monica, California. It is most notable as the home village in the early 19th century of Bartolomea, better known as Victoria Reid after her second marriage. She was a respected Indigenous woman in Mexican California, who was among the few indigenous people to receive a land grant. As a young widow, she married Scottish immigrant Hugo Reid, who became a naturalized Mexican citizen. The village is referred in various records and spellings to as Comigranga, Comicraibit, Comicrabit, and possibly Coronababit.

== History ==
=== Indigenous ===
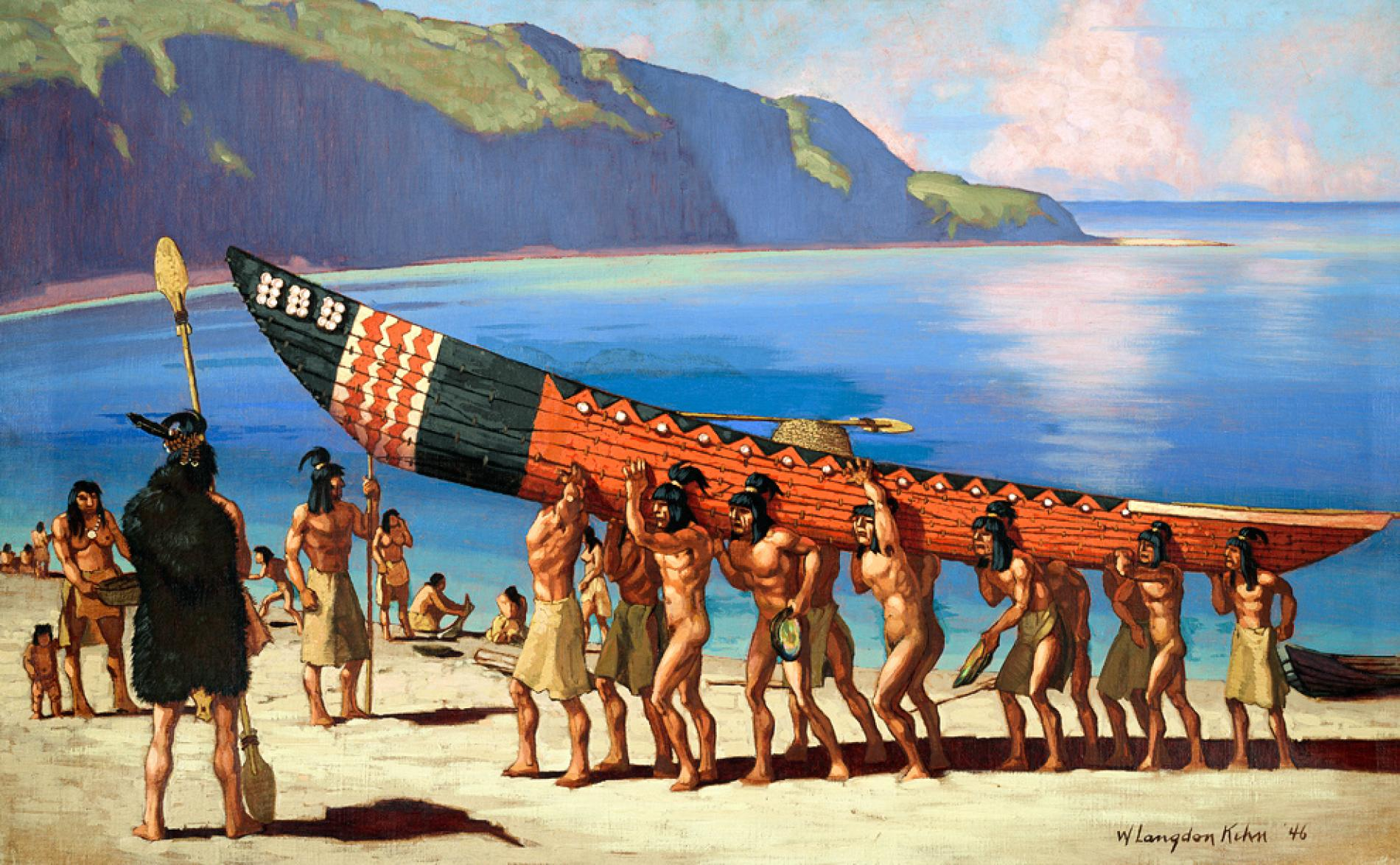
The village was connected to the Chumash (pictured with a tomol) through marriage ties.

The village was established in the coastal region of western Tovaangar. As a coastal village, the usage of te'aats may have been important to the village's people. Villagers likely ate acorns, seeds, berries, small game, fish and shellfish. Shell mounds were also likely a part of the village.

The people in the village was connected to the Chumash through marriage ties. The village was located near Guashna.

=== Mission San Gabriel ===
Following the Spanish establishment of Mission San Gabriel in 1771, the colonists gradually drew villagers away from surrounding settlements. They were brought to the mission for conversion to Christianity and to provide a labor force to work the mission grounds. Villagers worked in de facto slave conditions that third-party observers at Mission San Gabriel viewed with repulsion.

The earliest recorded baptisms of people being taken to Mission San Gabriel began in 1790. These baptisms reportedly peaked around 1803 and 1805, and then dropped off by 1819. This was around the same time that ranchers began to acquire land in the area of the village.

In 1812, it was recorded by Franciscan missionaries that a language dialect may have originated from the village which they referred to as "Kokomcar."

Many of the villagers died at the mission. There were a total of 7,854 baptisms (2,459 children) and 5,656 deaths (2,916 children) until secularization in 1834 at the mission, indicating a very high rate of death. Children died very young at the missions. One missionary at Mission San Gabriel reported that three out of every four children born died before reaching the age of two.

The mission period ended with the passage of the Mexican secularization act in 1833 by the First Mexican Republic. Secularization at Mission San Gabriel occurring shortly after.

== Victoria Bartolomea Reid ==
Bartolomea was born at Comicranga between 1808 and 1810 as the daughter of the chief of the village and his wife. Missionaries took her from the village and her parents at the age of six, for conversion to Christianity at Mission San Gabriel. There she lived with other girls, single women and widows in a guarded dormitory. After an approved marriage to an indio chosen by the Franciscan fathers, she and her husband were granted a small portion of land. This passed to her at his death, and she was notable for receiving a larger land grant, Rancho Huerta de Cuati, in the Mexican era for her service to the mission.
