= Lacy Park =

Public park in San Marino, California, US

Coordinates: 34.12042°N 118.12228°W

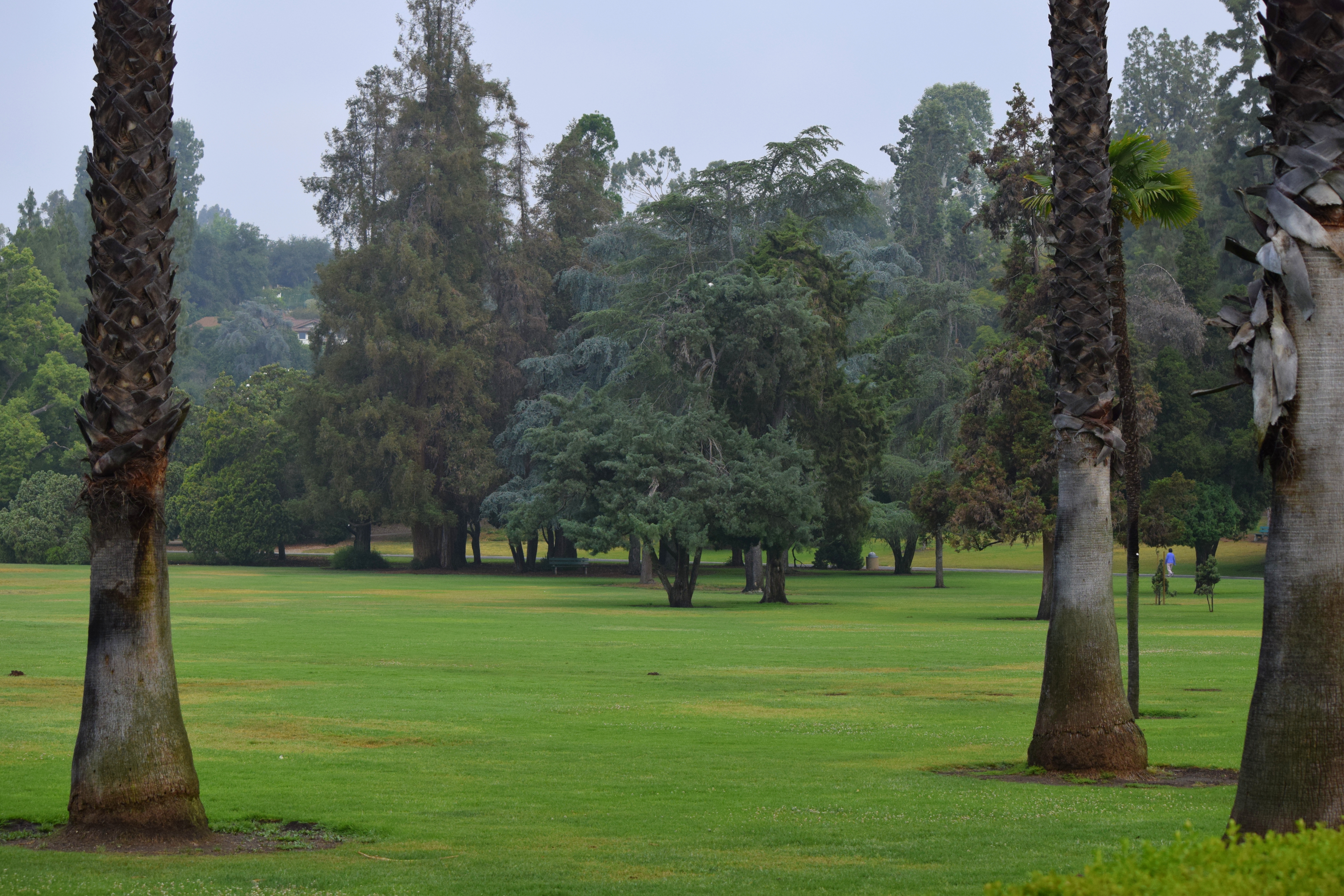
Lacy Park

Lacy Park is a public park located in the city of San Marino, California. It is located in the San Rafael Hills, at 1485 Virginia Road. The park features large trees, open grass space, a rose garden, walking loops, tennis courts, as well as other amenities and areas. The main entrance is on Virginia Road, but access is available on St Albans Road (weekdays only). Non-residents of San Marino are charged a $4 fee on weekends. The weekend fees are then used for park maintenance.

The park is named after San Marino's former mayor, Richard H. Lacy.

== Description ==
Consisting of over thirty acres of open space in the center San Marino, Lacy Park was opened in 1925. It was formerly part of the 19th century Rancho Huerta de Cuati Mexican land grant. Originally Wilson Lake in 1875, the land was purchased by the city in 1925 and dedicated as a park.

The park is known for its extensive arboretum of trees, its immaculate rose garden, and its monument to General George Patton, who once resided in San Marino.

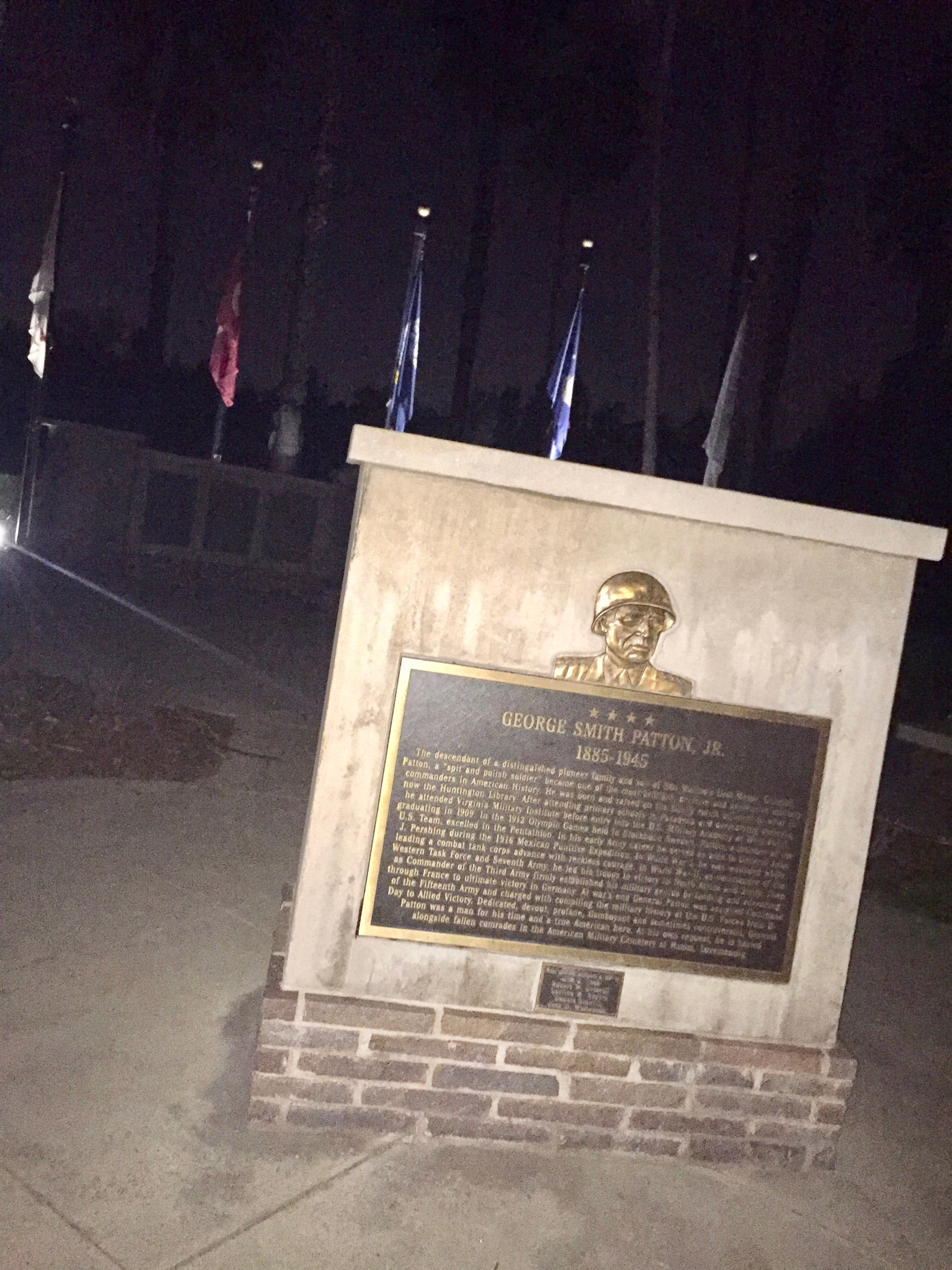
Tribute to General George S. Patton at Lacy Park.

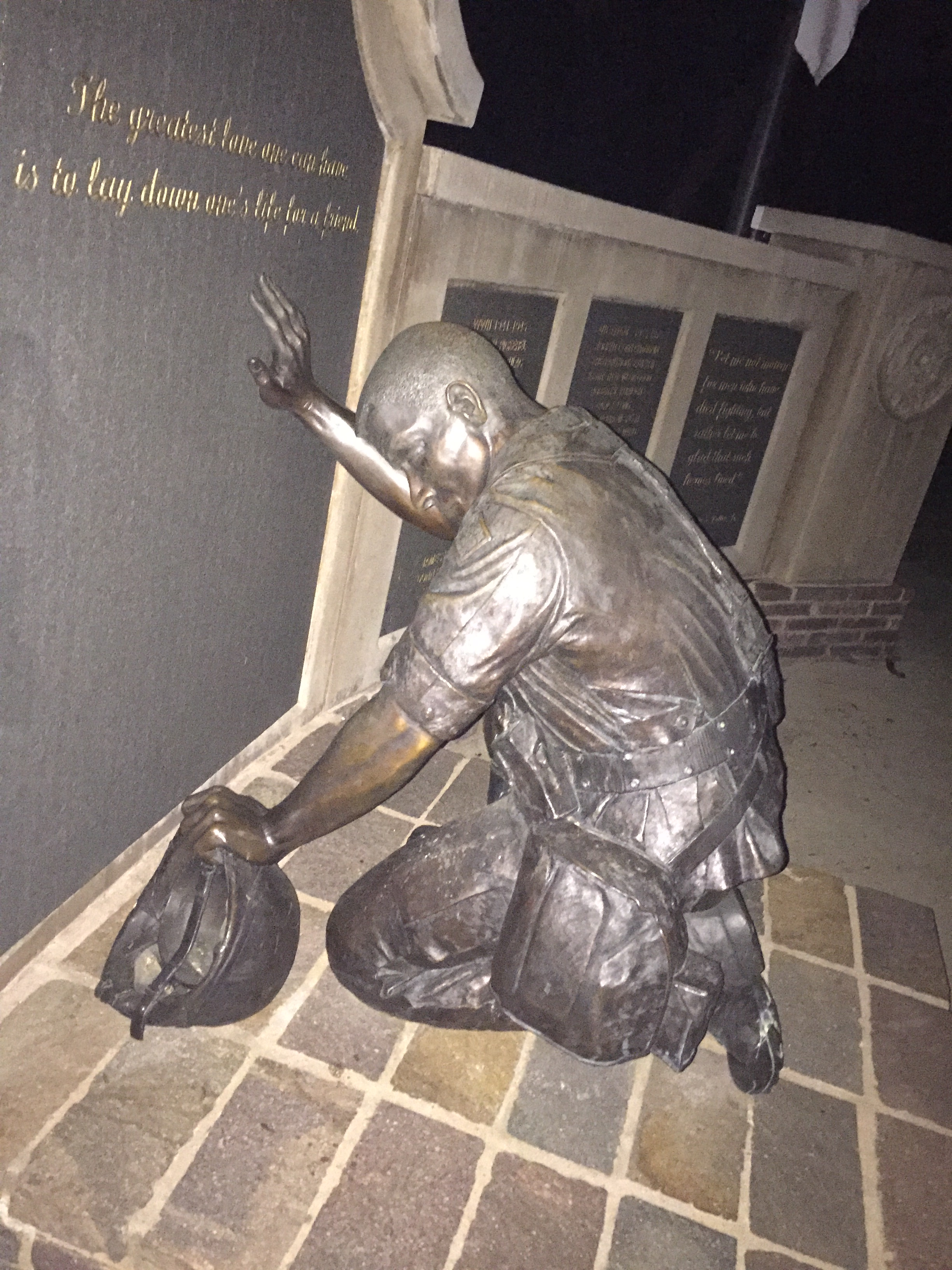
A WWII memorial at the park.

Leashed dogs are allowed in the park. In 2008, the San Marino City Council briefly considered building a dog park within Lacy Park to help fulfill a local resident's Eagle Scout project, but rejected the proposal due to vehement opposition from other residents.

=== Geologic features ===
In the center of the park is a depression that was once a sag pond which developed at a left stepover of the Raymond Fault. The lake (known as Wilson Lake or Kewen Lake) was drained in the mid-1920s. Scarp of the fault can be seen in the north part of the park near Virginia Road.

== Access ==
Admission to the park is free during the week, but non-residents of San Marino are charged $5 for admittance on Saturday and Sunday. Although the city claims this fee exists to cover park maintenance and upgrades, in 2007 the Los Angeles Times reported that the city had received hundreds of thousands of dollars from the state and Federal block grants which most cities receive for those purposes. The Los Angeles Times article states that, according to state law, these fees are legal as long as they are "reasonable".

== See also ==
- El Molino Viejo
- Huntington Library, Art Collections and Botanical Gardens
