= Fernando Librado =

Chumash elder and master builder (1839–1915)

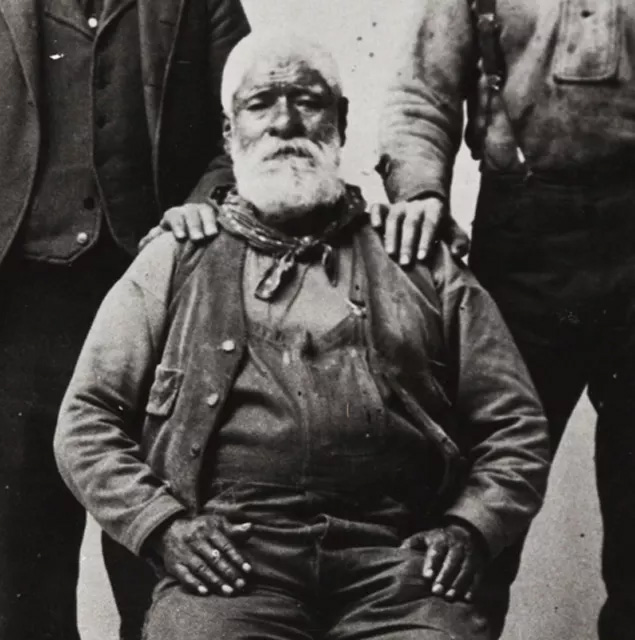
- Fernando Librado (circa 1912)
- Born: August 20, 1839; Mission San Buenaventura, Alta California, Mexican Republic
- Died: June 19, 1915 (aged 75); Santa Barbara, California, United States
- Other names: Kitsepawit
- Occupations: Master builder, craft specialist
- Known for: Knowledge of Chumash people, Indigenous experiences at Spanish missions in California, singing of Juana Maria's song

Kitsepawit, more commonly known as Fernando Librado (Note: His surname Librado or "book lover" was acquired late in his life, in reference to his advanced reading ability. He was recorded in records at Mission San Buenaventura as Bernardo, yet his name was changed to Fernando for easier pronunciation by Chumash language speakers (in which the br sound is not present). Fernando's Chumash name was Kitsepawit, which he indicated was also the name of his father, grandfather, and great-grandfather. This pattern of passing a patronym may have been uncharacteristic in Chumash culture and may have been modeled on European naming traditions, although this is unknown.) (c. August 20, 1839 – June 19, 1915), was a Chumash elder, master tomol builder, craft specialist, and storyteller. He was born at Mission San Buenaventura in 1839 as the son of two Chumash parents from the island of Limuw.

He is most notable for his knowledge of Chumash culture and language (especially of the Ventureño, Cruzeño, and Purisimeño), Indigenous experiences at Spanish mission in California, particularly in the post-mission period, his work as an informant for John Peabody Harrington, and for his recording of a song of Juana Maria on a wax cylinder.

== Early life ==
His parents, Mamerto Yaguiahuit and Juana Alfonsa, were both born on Limuw, which the Spanish named Santa Cruz Island. Mamerto was from the village of Nanawani and was baptized at the age of two in 1814. Juana was from the village of Swaxil and was baptized at the age of five in 1816. They were brought to Mission San Buenaventura as children. They were not married until May 3, 1830.

Fernando was born on August 20, 1839, as the fifth child of the couple. However, all four of the couple's previous children, Francisca, Venancio, Geronimo Emiliano, and Juana de Dios, had died in infancy. Fernando was baptized at Mission San Buenaventura as part of a third generation of Chumash people – those who did not firsthand experience life prior to European contact, yet were very close to those who did.

His father was killed a year after his birth on October 28, 1840, from blows to the head by an unknown assailant.

== Youth ==
Librado was raised at Mission La Purisma. He listened attentively to the stories and knowledge of his elders in the Chumash community, which would later become important to furthering Chumash knowledge to the present. Much of this knowledge would be recorded by anthropologist J.P. Harrington.

As a boy, he witnessed the last original pre-Columbian tomols, which became important in his later reconstruction of the plank boat. At the age of fourteen, he ran away from Ventura with another boy by the name Simplicio Pico.

In 1856, at the age of eighteen, he was listed in a newspaper article as a laborer at La Espada rancho, along with another laborer by the name of Ramon who Fernando referred to as his "uncle" and whom was also of Island Chumash descent. Ramon was actually, Ramon Malo, who was the grantee of Mission La Purisma from 1845 until his death in 1859.

The La Espada rancho was called by the earlier Chumash village name Shilimaqshtush by another Chumash man recorded in the 1856 newspaper article as Conóyo. This man was Konoyo, referred to by the Spanish name Silverio. Konoyo was from Wi'ma, later referred to as Santa Rosa Island, and taught Fernando much knowledge on tomol construction, that he would implement in his later life.

== Later life ==
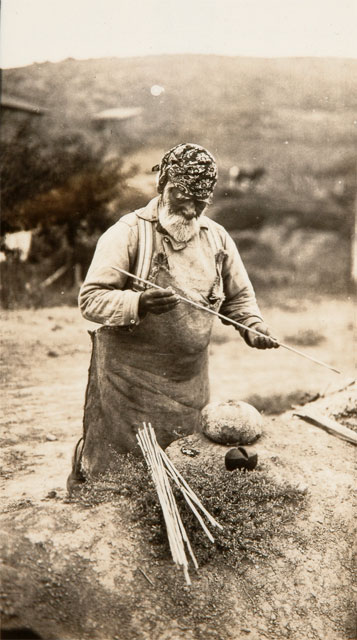
Librado demonstrating arrow-making in 1912.

From around 1880 onward, at the age of forty-one, Librado lived much of his later life at Lompoc and Las Cruces, California, where he lived in a small cave in the local mountains of the Santa Barbara area. This cave required an adult to crouch down in order to enter, yet once inside allowed for one to stand up fully upright. He may have acquired the name Librado or "book lover" in his later life by the recognition of his advanced reading skills.

From this cave, Librado worked at a local ranch as a craftsman, shepherd, midwife, medicine man, and physician. He was well known by many residents in the area. He would occasionally take trips to the nearby Tranquillon Mountain, which is now the site of the Vandenberg Space Force Base, to gather medicinal plants native to the area.

In 1912, Librado directed the reconstruction of a tomol, boats that he referred to as the “house of the sea." This was a functional wooden plank canoe that was constructed with knowledge he acquired through earlier instruction from Konoyo. That same year, numerous photographs were taken of Librado demonstrating various acts of crafting and building, which indicates his vast knowledge and expertise as a builder and crafting specialist.

Beginning in 1912, he worked extensively with John Peabody Harrington to record his vast knowledge, stories, and memories. This included accounts of Indigenous experiences throughout the missions, such as stories of resistance against mission authority and sexual abuse experienced by Indigenous women at the monjeríos that had been passed onto him by others. He also recorded much knowledge on the craft specialist group Brotherhood of the Canoe and information on Chumash watercraft.

In 1913, he sang Juana Maria's song known as Toki Toki for a wax cylinder recording. Librado had learned this song from Melquiades, a Chumash man who had first heard Maria sing the song in 1853.

== Legacy ==
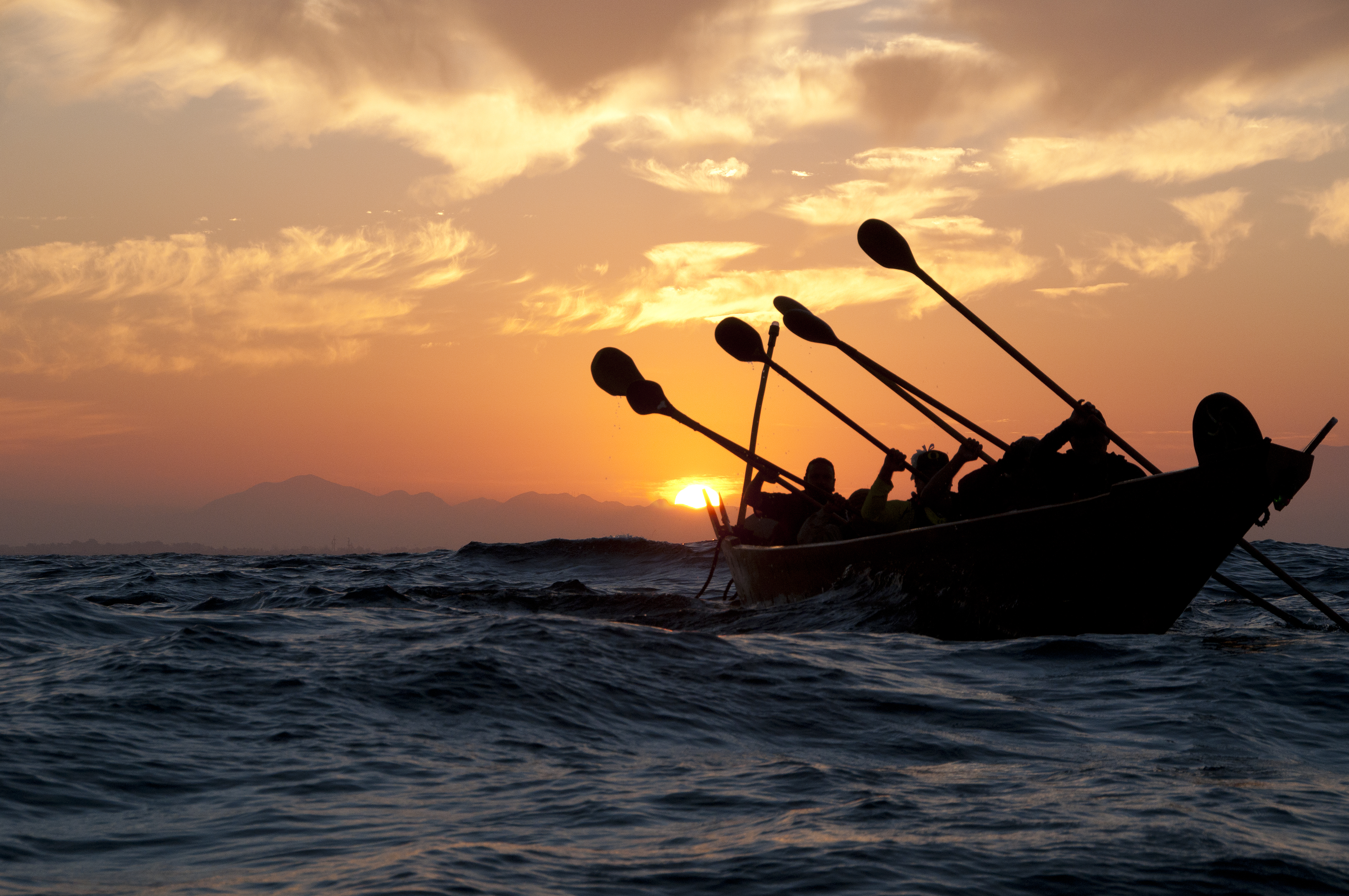
Librado's legacy lives on in the reconstruction of tomols that has been revitalized among the contemporary Chumash people.

Librado died in 1915 at Santa Barbara's Cottage Hospital. He died having passed on much knowledge of Chumash culture and lifeways. His testimony and works are featured in numerous books and articles.

His work in reconstructing the tomol has lived on to the revitalization of the Chumash cultural practice of reconstructing tomols and paddling out to the islands off California's coast. In 2022, the 20th annual trip was taken from Santa Barbara, California to Limuw (Santa Cruz Island) via tomol.
