= Richard H. Lacy =

American politician and businessman

Mayor of San Marino, California
- In office August 13, 1924 – January 14, 1942
- Preceded by: George S. Patton
- Succeeded by: H. Stanley Bent

City Councilman of San Marino, California
- In office April 25, 1913 – January 14, 1942

Personal details
- Born: Richard H. Lacy; August 14, 1866 Marin County, California
- Died: July 3, 1945 (aged 88) Huntington Hospital, Pasadena, California, U.S.
- Resting place: San Gabriel Cemetery, San Gabriel, California, U.S.

Richard H. Lacy (August 14, 1866 - July 3, 1945) was an American businessman, politician, and pioneer of San Marino, California, serving as its longtime mayor for 18 years. Prior to his election as mayor, Lacy was a major industrialist, oil tycoon, and real estate developer in the Los Angeles area and city councilman.

== Early years ==
Richard Lacy was born in Marin County, California to British-born businessman William Lacy Sr. and his wife Isabella Rigg Lacy. The Lacy family owned Lacy Manufacturing Company, then one of the largest corporations in California.

William Lacy Sr. moved his family frequently for business opportunities. First meeting his wife in Illinois, the family moved to Marin County, California, where Richard and his brother William Jr. were born, then to San Diego County, California, before finally arriving in Los Angeles in 1875. In Los Angeles, William Sr. found financial success, establishing the Lacy Manufacturing Company in 1887.

=== Takeover of Lacy Manufacturing Co. ===
In 1897, William Lacy Sr. died, leaving Richard Lacy and his brother William Jr. as heirs. The brother-duo bought out their old business partner and successfully heralded the company. Under the ownership of the brothers, the company expanded into the oil industry and real estate.

In June 1932, Richard's brother William Lacy Jr. committed suicide, age 67, leaving Richard as the sole owner of Lacy Manufacturing Company.

== Political career ==
Lacy built a home with his wife in 1908 along the border of San Gabriel and South Pasadena. The house was on the San Gabriel side, which eventually incorporated as San Marino five years later. Richard Lacy was an early pioneer of San Marino, serving as a city councilman at the city's founding in 1913. Lacy remained on the city council for 29 years under mayors George S. Patton and William L. Valentine.

As city councilman, Lacy oversaw the founding of the San Marino Fire Department in 1923. This included a voter initiative to purchase a fire engine, leading to the city's first bond offering. As Mayor, Lacy was noted as a particularly frequent user of the fire department's services at his home.

Lacy's term as mayor began when mayor George S. Patton stepped down for the second and final time. Lacy continued his role as a member of the city council while mayor.

=== Lacy Park ===
Mayor Lacy oversaw the draining of Wilson Lake, which had degraded from a proper lake into a mosquito-infested marsh. The surrounding area became Lacy Park, named in Lacy's honor.

=== Withdrawal from politics ===
Lacy's health began deteriorating in 1942, leading to his resignation as mayor on January 14, 1942. His public appearances became increasingly sporadic, the last occurring in June 1945, as a welcoming party for General George S. Patton, native of San Marino and son of Lacy's longtime colleague Mayor Patton. Lacy died shortly thereafter on July 3, 1945, at nearby Huntington Hospital in Pasadena.

== Personal life ==
Lacy married Maud Sullivan, his first cousin, in 1893 in San Gabriel. Maud and Richard had five daughters and one son, which they raised at their home in San Marino. Maud died of breast cancer in January 1940, age 68.

Maud and Richard's only son, Richard William Lacy, died in 1927, age 33.

Richard Lacy is buried at his family's plot in San Gabriel.
