= Marina Bay =

Marina Bay may refer to the following places:

- Marina Bay, Singapore
  - Marina Bay MRT station
  - Marina Bay Street Circuit
- Marina Bay, Richmond, California, United States
- Marina Bay (Quincy, Massachusetts), United States
- Marina Bay, Gibraltar

== See also ==
- Marina (disambiguation)
- Bay (disambiguation)
- Marina Beach, Chennai, India
