= Rancho Huerta de Cuati =

Mexican land grant in modern Los Angeles County, California

Coordinates: 34.120°N 118.170°W

- Land grant of Mexico
  - Type: Mexican land grant
- Today part of: United States

Rancho Huerta de Cuati was a 127-acre (0.51 km^{2}) Mexican land grant in the San Rafael Hills area of present-day Los Angeles County, California given in 1838 by governor Juan Alvarado to Victoria Reid. The name means "Cuati Garden" in Spanish. The rancho included present-day Alhambra, San Marino, South Pasadena, and Pasadena—and Lake Wilson (now San Marino's Lacy Park).

== History ==
Rancho Huerta de Cuati had been part of the lands of Mission San Gabriel Arcángel before the Mexican government secularized the missions in 1834. It was one of the few Mexican grants given to a Native American. With the assistance of influential Eulalia Pérez de Guillén Mariné, keeper of the keys at the mission, Victoria Reid (Indigenous Californian) received the rancho for her past service to the mission. Her husband, Hugo Reid was not listed on the title because he was not yet a Mexican citizen. He was naturalized in 1839.

United States

When Mexico ceded California to the United States following the Mexican-American War, the 1848 Treaty of Guadalupe Hidalgo provided that its historic land grants would be honored. But, the United States required by the Land Act of 1851 that Mexican citizens had to file claims for their land holdings. Reid filed a claim for Rancho Huerta de Cuati with the Public Land Commission in 1852. The grant was patented to Victoria Reid in 1859.

Hugo Reid died in 1852. The American court appointed a conservator, Benjamin Davis Wilson, purportedly to protect the widow Victoria Reid, as an indigenous woman was not believed to be competent. But in 1854 she sold Rancho Huerta de Cuati for a nominal cost to Wilson. Although literate, she reportedly signed the deed with a cross. However, some indigenous connected to the San Gabriel Valley have debated this issue. While a deed indicated that Wilson paid Victoria $7,000 for her land, there are descendants of the native Indians from this area who insist that she never received payment and that the land was taken from her. Having gotten control, Wilson renamed the property as "Lake Vineyard Ranch". The ranch had a 40-acre (0.16 km^{2}) shallow pond fed by streams of Old Mill El Molino Viejo Canyon and Wilson Canyon (Wilson-Woodbury Creek of Washington Park).

Later, Wilson deeded the main portion of the rancho to his son-in-law, James de Barth Shorb. He named his rancho after his grandfather's plantation in Maryland. That property had been named for the Republic of San Marino, in Italy.

== See also ==
- El Molino Viejo — adjacent grist mill of the mission.
- Ranchos of California
- List of Ranchos of California
- Ranchos of Los Angeles County
