= José María de Zalvidea =

Spanish missionary (1780–1846)

José María de Zalvidea (2 March 1780 – 1846) was a Spanish Franciscan missionary. He was born at Bilbao, Vizcaya, Spain, and became a Franciscan at the convent of San Mames, Cantabria, on 13 December 1798. He joined the College of San Fernando de Mexico in 1804 and became a missionary to the California Native Americans in August 1805.

== Biography ==
Zalvidea, a Franciscan since 1798, served at Mission San Fernando Rey de España until 1806. From 19 July to 14 August 1806, Zalvidea accompanied an expedition from Santa Barbara east and then south to San Gabriel in search of new mission sites, meanwhile baptizing many dying people. The 1913 Catholic Encyclopedia describes him as "well versed" in Native American languages.

Zalvidea served at Mission San Gabriel Arcángel beginning in 1806, where he was a major formative influence, responsible for much of its economic development. His head housekeeper, Eulalia Pérez, describes him as "a very good, loving, and charitable man" who was "well loved" by both the natives and the Spanish settlers. On the other hand, contemporary writer Hugo Reid criticizes his treatment of the natives, describing him as "severe" and "most cruel", and as making unusually heavy use of flogging, as well as other notably punitive practices. On learning that some native women sought abortions, Reid writes, "he put down all miscarriages to the same cause. Therefore when a woman had the misfortune to bring forth a stillborn child, she was punished. The penalty inflicted was, shaving the head, flogging for fifteen subsequent days, iron on the feet for three months, and having to appear every Sunday in church, on the steps leading up to the altar, with a hideous painted wooden child in her arms."

In 1826, Zalvidea was transferred from San Gabriel to Mission San Juan Capistrano, to fill a vacancy there. He remained at San Juan Capistrano until 1842, when he was removed to Mission San Luis Rey de Francia due to rumors of danger, despite his own reluctance to leave. Zalvidea, already sick before the difficult trip, died only four years later.

Even when quite old, Zalvidea refused to avail himself of the privilege of retiring because there would be no one to take his place, since the Mexican Government had declined to let any but Mexicans serve in the missions. Like all the other missionaries he would not approve of the methods of the Mexican politicians by swearing allegiance, refusing to do so on the grounds that he did not meddle with politics, but he offered to swear obedience in everything not against conscience.

Zalvidea appears to have undertaken an initiative to grant native peoples their village lands—grants made by Zalvidea include Rancho Little Temecula, Rancho Guajome and Rancho Cuca.
