= Mariner (disambiguation) =

A mariner is a sailor.

Mariner or Mariners may also refer to:

== Computing ==
- CBL-Mariner, a free and open source cloud infrastructure operating system based on Linux and developed by Microsoft
- Mariner (browser engine), a canceled project to enhance the Netscape Communicator suite of web browsers

== Films and television ==
- Mariner (film), 2016 Canadian film directed by Thyrone Tommy
- Beckett "Mariner" Freeman, a character in Star Trek: Lower Decks

== Literature ==
- The Mariner (newspaper), an English-language newspaper in Toulouse, France
- Mariner Books, a division of Houghton Mifflin Harcourt
- Mariner Group, a chain of weekly newspapers

== Music ==
- The Mariners (vocal group), a mid 20th century pop and gospel vocal group associated with Arthur Godfrey
- Mariner (album), a 2016 album by Cult of Luna and Julie Christmas
- "Mariners Apartment Complex", a song by Lana Del Rey on the 2019 album Norman Fucking Rockwell!

== Places ==
- Mariner Glacier, a major glacier descending southeast from the plateau of Victoria Land
- Mariner Mountain, a mountain on the west coast of Vancouver Island, British Columbia, Canada
- Mariner oilfield, an oilfield in the North Sea off Scotland
- Mariners Harbor, Staten Island, a neighborhood in the northwestern part Staten Island
  - Mariners' Harbor station, a station on the abandoned North Shore Branch of the Staten Island Railway

== Sports ==
- Arizona League Mariners, a minor league baseball team in Peoria, Arizona
- Baltimore Mariners, an American indoor football team
- Bellingham Mariners, a former Minor League Baseball team based in Bellingham, Washington
- Central Coast Mariners FC, an Australian association football team
- Gijón Mariners, a Spanish American football team
- Grimsby Town F.C., an English football team, nicknamed the Mariners
- Harwich Mariners, a collegiate summer baseball team based in Harwich, Massachusetts
- Hunter Mariners, an Australian former rugby league football club which participated in the short-lived Super League
- Maine Mariners (AHL), a professional ice hockey team based in Portland, Maine, from 1977 to 1992
- Maine Mariners (ECHL), a professional ice hockey team based in Portland, Maine, since 2018
- Merchant Marine Mariners, any of the United States Merchant Marine Academy's intercollegiate sports teams
- Mohun Bagan Super Giant, an Indian association football club based in Kolkata, West Bengal, nicknamed The Mariners
- San Diego Mariners, an American World Hockey Association team
- Seattle Mariners, an American Major League Baseball team
  - Mariner Moose, the team mascot of the Seattle Mariners
- Virginia Beach Mariners, an American United Soccer Leagues team
- Yarmouth Mariners, a Canadian Maritime Junior A Hockey League team

== Vehicles ==
=== Ships ===
- HMS Mariner, a list of ships of the Royal Navy
- GSI Mariner, a Canadian research/survey ship
- HMS Mariner (1801), a gun-brig of the Royal Navy
- HMS Mariner (1846), an Acorn-class brig-sloop of the Royal Navy
- HMS Juno (1844) or HMS Mariner, a 26-gun sixth-rate
- HMS Mariner (1884), a Mariner-class composite screw sloop
- HMS Mariner (J380), an Algerine-class minesweeper launched in 1944
- Mariner (1807 ship), a ship launched at Whitby
- Mariner (1809 ship), a ship launched at Philadelphia
- Seven Seas Mariner, a cruise ship operated by Regent Seven Seas Cruises
- USS Mariner (1906), a commercial tugboat operating in the Panama Canal area
- USS Mariner (SP-1136), a wooden-hulled United States Navy tugboat used in World War I
- Mariner 19, a model of American trailerable sailboat designed by Phillip Rhodes
- Mariner of the Seas, a cruise ship operated by Royal Caribbean

=== Aircraft ===
- Mariner Aircraft Mariner, a model American ultralight amphibious flying boat
- Martin PBM Mariner, a model of American patrol bomber flying boat of World War II
- Two Wings Mariner UL, an American amphibious biplane designed for amateur construction

=== Cars ===
- Mercury Mariner, a compact SUV

== Other uses ==
- Mariner program, a NASA project involving a series of 10 robotic probes to investigate Mars, Venus and Mercury
- Mariner (surname), a surname (and list of people with the surname)
- Mariner (crater), an impact crater on Mars
- Mariners Church, a non-denominational, Christian Church in Irvine, California
- Mariners' Church, an Anglican church in Detroit, Michigan
- Mariner High School (Cape Coral, Florida), high school in Cape Coral, Florida
- Mariner High School (Everett, Washington), high school in Everett, Washington
- Mariners House, a historic hotel in Boston, Massachusetts
- Mariners' Museum and Park, a museum in Newport News, Virginia

== See also ==
- Licensed mariner, a sailor who holds a license to hold senior officer-level positions aboard ships
- Marine (disambiguation)
- Mariner Mark II, planned but aborted spacecraft program for the years 1990 to 2010; later replaced by the Discovery Program
- Marines
- Marriner, a surname and given name
- Master mariner, a licensed mariner who holds the highest grade of seafarer qualification
- Merchant Mariner Credential, a credential issued by the United States Coast Guard
- The Rime of the Ancient Mariner, a poem by Samuel Taylor Coleridge
