= Marriner =

Marriner is both a surname and a given name. Notable people with the name include:

Surname: Ricky Marriner (born 1984), Soldier British Army

- Andre Marriner (born 1971), English professional football referee who officiates in the Premier League
- Andrew Marriner (born 1954), British classical clarinettist
- Chelsea Marriner, dog handler and trainer from New Zealand
- Craig Marriner (born 1974), New Zealand novelist
- Sir Neville Marriner (1924–2016), English conductor and violinist
- Steve Marriner, Canadian multi-instrumentalist

Given name:

- Marriner Stoddard Eccles (1890–1977), U.S. banker, economist and member and chairman of the Federal Reserve
- Marriner W. Merrill (1832–1906), Canadian-born member of the Quorum of the Twelve Apostles of The Church of Jesus Christ of Latter-day Saints
- Edmund Marriner Gill (1820–1894), English landscape painter who favoured waterfalls

== See also ==
- Mount Marriner, a mountain in the Antarctic
- Mariner (disambiguation)
