= Marine Drive =

Marine Drive may refer to:

== Roads ==
=== Bangladesh ===
- Cox Bazar-Tekhnaf Marine Drive, world's longest marine drive road.

=== Canada ===
- Marine Drive (Nova Scotia), a scenic route in Nova Scotia
- Marine Drive (Greater Vancouver), a number of roadways in Metropolitan Vancouver

=== India ===
- Marine Drive, Mumbai, a major boulevard in South Mumbai in the city of Mumbai
- Marine Drive, Kochi, a promenade in Kochi

=== United Kingdom ===
- Marine Drive (Llandudno), a road around the Great Orme headland in Llandudno, Wales
- Marine Drive (Scarborough), a section of seafront road in Scarborough, England

=== United States ===
- Marine Drive, the former name of Guam Highway 1

== Films ==
- Marine Drive (film), a 1955 Bollywood film directed by G. P. Sippy

== See also ==
- Marine Drive Station, a rapid transit station in Vancouver
- North Marine Drive, 1983 Ben Watt album and its title track
- Saildrive, a form of engine installation for sailing yachts
