= Marine Parade (disambiguation) =

Marine Parade is a residential estate in Singapore.

Marine Parade may also refer to:

- Marine Parade, Napier, New Zealand, a roadway and esplanade
- Marine Parade (play), a 2010 musical play by Simon Stephens
- "Marine Parade (2013)", a song by James Arthur from the 2019 album You
- Marine Parade Records, a British record label founded in 1998
