= Marina (ship) =

Marina may refer to:

- MV Marina, built in 1935 as Kronprinsessan Ingrid; renamed Christopher Polhem in 1935 and Marina in 1963; retired from service in 2006
- SS Marina, built in 1945 as Empire Antelope; renamed Culross in 1946, Akastos in 1960 and Marina in 1968; scrapped in 1968
- MS Marina, a cruise ship built in 2009 and entering service in 2010 and owned by Oceania Cruises
