= Rancho Cuca =

Mexican land grant in California

Coordinates: 33.290°N 116.900°W

Rancho Cuca was a 2,174-acre (8.80 km^{2}) Mexican land grant in present-day San Diego County, California, given in 1845 by Governor Pío Pico to María Juana de los Angeles. The grant was located south of Palomar Mountain.

== History ==
The half square league grant was made to María Juana de los Angeles, an Indian.

With the cession of California to the United States following the Mexican–American War, the 1848 Treaty of Guadalupe Hidalgo provided that the land grants would be honored. As required by the Land Act of 1851, a claim for Rancho Cuca was filed with the Public Land Commission in 1852, and the grant was patented to María Juana de los Angeles in 1879.

The Mendenhall family purchased 1,800 acres after the turn of the 20th century. In 1954, Manchester Boddy bought Cuca, selling it in 1955 to Irving Salomon. It was sold to developers in 1957, who subdivided the property.
