= Marine 5 (Rhode Island fireboat) =

North Kingstown, Rhode Island began operating a new 37 feet (11 m) fireboat named Marine 5 in 2013. The vessel was partially paid for by a FEMA Port Security Grant. The North Kingstown Fire Department is part of the Narragansett Bay Marine Task Force.

== Design ==
The vessel is a catamaran, manufactured by Moose Boats, of Petaluna, California. She is propelled by waterjets and can project 1250 gallons per minute. She is equipped with advanced sensors, including forward looking infrared and sidescan sonar.

== Operational history ==
The vessel received 42 calls for service in 2013, 87 calls in 2014 and about 100 in 2015. In 2016 the vessel responded to a call to search for a lobster fisherman who went overboard offshore North Kingstown. In July 2016 she provided emergency medical care to a recreational boater who suffered a heart attack.

On May 26, 2015, regional firefighters prepared for the potential of a crash-landing when an Air National Guard C-130 had to make an emergency landing at Quonset Airport. The mobilization included mobilizing Marine 5.

On August 6, 2016, the Coast Guard and the Task Force were called out for a fire on a pleasure craft, off Hog Island. Marine 5 extinguished the fire.
