= Mariner oilfield =

UK oil field in the North Sea

Mariner Oilfield
- Location within North Sea
- Country: Scotland
- Region: Shetland Basin
- Block: 9/11a
- Offshore/onshore: Offshore
- Coordinates: 59°35′20″N 1°3′25″E
- Operator: https://adura.com/

Field history
- Discovery: 1981
- Start of production: 2019

Production
- Estimated oil in place: 250 million barrels (~3.4×10^{7} t)
- Producing formations: Maureen, Heimdal

The Mariner oilfield is located in the United Kingdom sector of the North Sea, about 150 kilometres (93 mi) east of the Shetland Islands, Scotland, in block 9/11a. It was discovered in 1981 at a depth of about 1,200 metres (3,900 ft) below sea level. Water depth in the area is about 100 metres (330 ft). Estimated recovery is at least 250 million barrels (40×10^{6} m^{3}) of oil.

As of December 2012 the operator, Statoil, has made the investment decision and final approval of the field development plan by the UK authorities is in progress. The plan envisages a production, drilling and quarters platform based on a conventional steel jacket, exporting oil via a floating storage unit. The oil is heavy and viscous, with API gravities of 12.1°–14.6° and viscosities ranging from 67cp in the field's Maureen reservoir to 508cp in the Heimdal reservoir. The small volume of associated gas will be used as fuel for the platform, and more fuel gas will be imported via a connection to the nearby Vesterled pipeline.

== Ownership ==
Equinor acquired the operatorship from Chevron in 2007, and then subsequently set up a Joint Venture with Shell to create a new operator Adura which holds a 65.1% stake in Mariner. NeoNext+ has a 20% interest; One-Dyas) has 6% and Ithaca Energy has 8.9%.
