= The Mariner (newspaper) =

- Type: Semi-Monthly
- Format: A3 Folded
- Owner: Independent
- Publisher: University of Toulouse Press
- Founded: 2010
- Language: English
- Headquarters: Toulouse, France
- Circulation: 1500
- Website: themarinernews.wordpress.com

The Mariner is a Toulouse-based English-language newspaper, aimed at the University of Toulouse's and city's English-friendly community, which offers both investigative journalism and original creative content.
