= Marner =

Marner is an English and German surname. Notable people with the surname include:

- Mitch Marner (born 1997), Canadian hockey player
- Peter Marner (1936–2007), English cricketer
- Richard Marner (1921–2004, born as Alexander Pavlovich Molchanov), Russian-born British actor

== See also ==
- Silas Marner, 1861 dramatic novel by George Eliot
- Der Marner, a Middle High German poet
