= List of unincorporated communities in Los Angeles County, California =

The estimated population of unincorporated areas in Los Angeles County, California, is 1,095,592, out of a total of 10,160,000 of the entire county.

== Unincorporated areas ==
This table includes 101 Census-designated places and other statistical areas.

Place	Population (as of 2010 Census)
Acton	7,596
Acton/Mint Canyon	11,901
Agua Dulce	20,330
Alondra Park	8,592
Altadena	43,975
Avocado Heights	16,007
Bandini Islands	0
Castaic	19,015
Castaic/Val Verde	31,000
Cerritos Island	2,090
Channel Islands	569
Charter Oak	9,310
Charter Oak Islands	19,754
Citrus	10,866
City Terrace	50,281
Covina Islands	19,131
Del Aire	9,200
Desert View Highlands	2,360
East Antelope Valley	14,658
East Azusa Islands	15,528
East Canyon Country	3,626
East Carson	4,027
East La Mirada	9,668
East Los Angeles	126,496
East Malibu Hills	2,218
East Pasadena	6,129
East Rancho Dominguez	14,076
East San Gabriel	20,671
East Whittier	9,757
Eastmont	19,091
Elizabeth Lake	1,756
Florence	38,986
Florence-Graham	63,387
Franklin Canyon	5
Glendora Islands	777
Graham	27,490
Green Valley	1,027
Hacienda Heights	57,354
Hasley Canyon	1,137
La Crescenta-Montrose	18,907
La Rambla	1,704
Ladera Heights	6,775
Lake Hughes	649
Lake Los Angeles	12,328
Lennox	25,942
Leona Valley	1,607
Littlerock	1,377
Littlerock/Pearblossom	15,213
Long Beach Islands	1,310
Lynwood Islands	241
Marina del Rey	8,262
Mayflower Village	5,515
North Claremont	2,524
North El Monte	3,723
North El Monte Islands	3,772
Northeast San Dimas	1,261
Northeast Whittier	1,053
Northwest Whittier	4,335
Norwalk/Cerritos Islands	336
Oat Mountain	1,385
Quartz Hill	16,081
Rose Hills	2,803
Rowland Heights	48,993
San Gabriel Mountains	3,003
San Pasqual	2,044
Sawtelle Veterans Administration Center	634
South Antelope Valley	10,214
South Monrovia Island	6,777
South Monrovia Islands	13,874
South San Gabriel	8,762
South San Jose Hills	21,779
South Whittier	51,609
Stevenson Ranch	17,531
Sun Village	11,565
Sunshine Acres	6,141
Topanga	8,289
Topanga Canyon	6,775
Triunfo Canyon	1,229
Universal City	0
Val Verde	2,468
Valinda	20,481
View Park–Windsor Hills	11,984
Vincent	15,922
Walnut Park	17,161
West Alondra Park	11,598
West Antelope Valley	4,119
West Arcadia Islands	1,830
West Athens	8,729
West Canyon Country	26,785
West Carson	22,946
West Chatsworth	2,376
West Malibu Islands	3,687
West Pomona Islands	3,687
West Puente Valley	23,972
West Rancho Dominguez	5,784
West Whittier	27,510
West Whittier-Los Nietos	25,540
Westfield	1,993
Westmont	45,063
Westridge	3,668
Whittier Narrows	1,828
Willowbrook	41,073

== Unincorporated communities ==
- Agoura
- Alla
- Alpine
- Alsace
- Altacanyada
- Andrade Corner
- Antelope Acres
- Antelope Center
- Athens
- Bassett
- Big Pines
- Boiling Point
- Bonner (unincorporated Eastern Long Beach)
- Castaic Junction
- Cornell
- Del Sur
- Del Valle
- Firestone Park
- Gorman
- Hillgrove
- Hi Vista
- Juniper Hills
- Kagel Canyon
- Kinneloa Mesa
- Largo Vista
- Llano
- Malibu Vista
- Monte Nido
- Neenach
- Ninetynine Oaks
- Pearblossom
- Pioneer (Unincorporated Cerritos & Lakewood)
- Rancho Dominguez
- Red Box
- Sand Canyon
- Sandberg
- Seminole Hot Springs
- Three Points
- Two Harbors
- Valencia
- Valyermo
- Westfield (unincorporated Rolling Hills)

== Ghost towns ==
- Achois
- Alpine
- Alyeupkigna
- Awigna
- Azucsagna
- Bairdstown
- Bartolo
- Cahuenga
- Chokishgna
- Chowigna
- Cow Springs
- Eldoradoville
- Falling Springs
- Fort Tejon
- Gaspur
- Guirardo
- Hahamongna
- Harasgna
- Holland Summit
- Hollands
- Holton
- Honmoyausha
- Houtgna
- Hyperion
- Isanthcogna
- Juyubit
- King's Station
- Kowanga
- Las Tunas
- Lyons Station
- Machado
- Malibu Mar Vista
- Maugna
- Mentryville
- Motordrome
- Mud Spring
- Nacaugna
- Oberg
- Okowvinjha
- Palisades del Rey
- Pasinogna
- Petroleopolis
- Pimocagna
- Pubugna
- Quapa
- Savannah
- Saway-yanga
- Sibagna
- Sisitcanogna
- Soledad Sulphur Springs
- Sonagna
- Suangna
- Takuyumam
- Toviseanga
- Toybipet
- Tuyunga
- Virgenes
- Wahoo
- Walton Place
- Widow Smith's Station
- Wilsona
