= Tovaangar =

Homelands of the Tongva

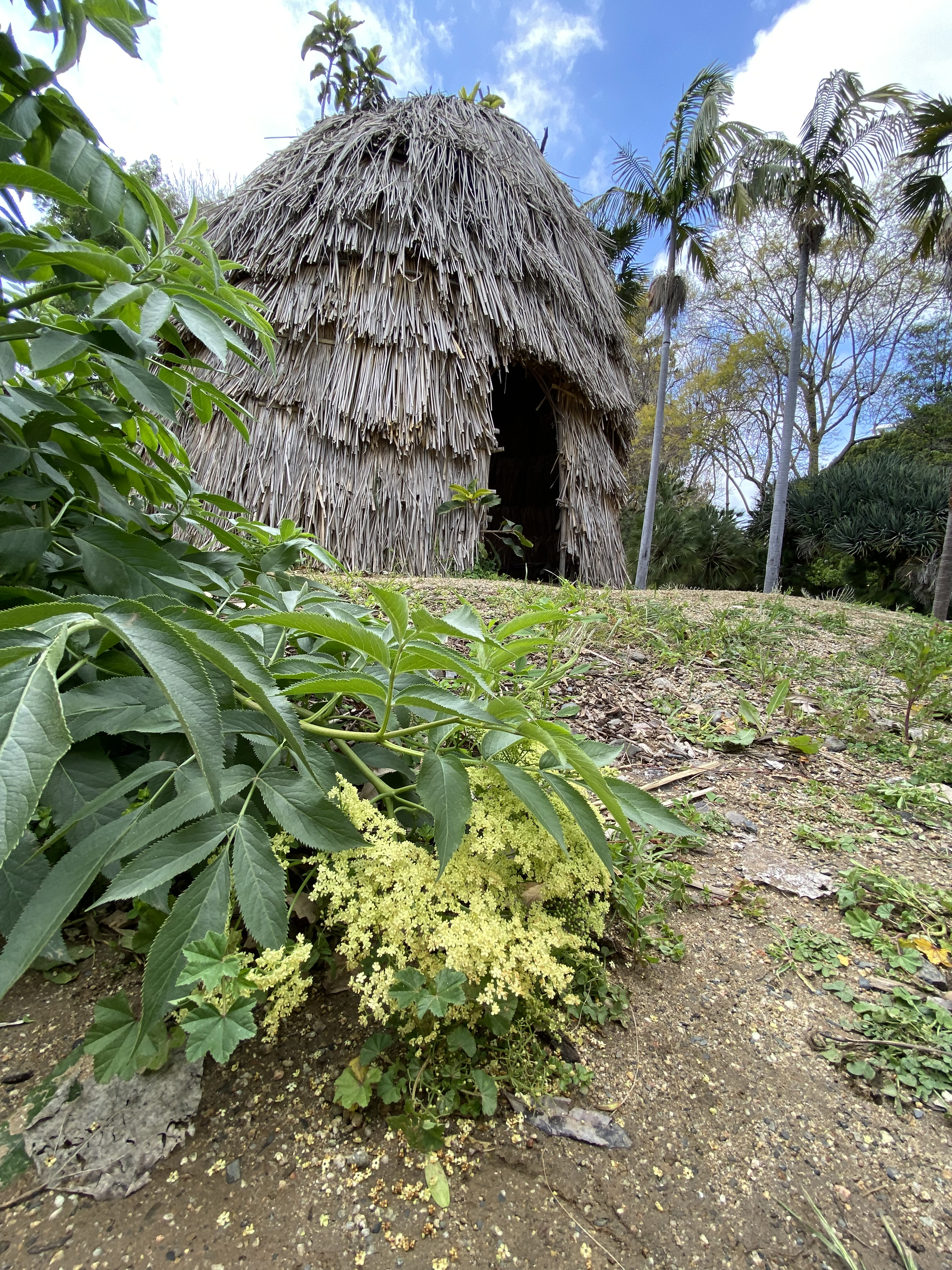
Tongva Sacred Springs (pictured March 2023)

Tovaangar (Tongva: "the world") refers to the Tongva world or homelands. It includes the greater area of the Los Angeles Basin, including the San Gabriel Valley, San Fernando Valley, northern Orange County, parts of San Bernardino County and Riverside County, and the southern Channel Islands, including San Nicholas, Santa Catalina, Santa Barbara, and San Clemente. The homelands of the Chumash are to the northwest, the Tataviam to the north, the Serrano and Cahuilla to the east, and the Acjachemen and Payómkawichum to the south.

== Travel ==
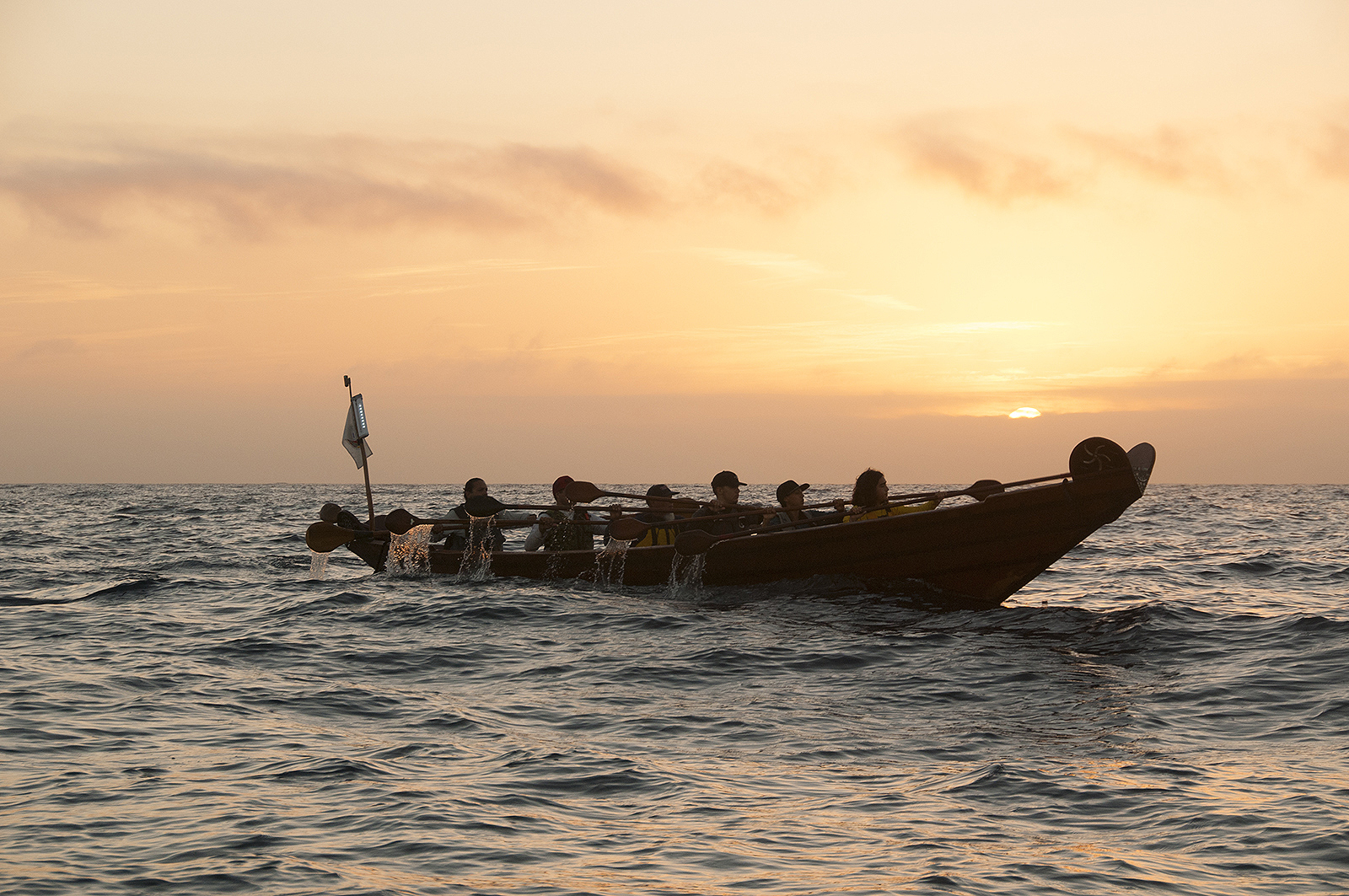
The Tongva still build ti'at, plank boats similar to the Chumash tomol (pictured), as part of keeping their cultural practices alive.

Prior to European colonialism, land travel through Tovaangar largely occurred through an extensive network of trails traveled by Indigenous peoples throughout the region. Although not often recognized by name, many of these trails became roads and highways that are now used for automobile travel. One of the most significant was the Mohave trail, which connected Tovaangar to nations in the east along what the Spanish referred to as the Colorado River.

Travel over water mainly occurred through tule reed boats for local travel through waterways. For ocean travel, particularly between the mainland and the villages on Pimuu'nga, Kinkipar, and Haraasnga, te'aats or ti'ats were common. These are wooden plank boats built by the Tongva currently in the Ti'at Society that are made air tight with a mixture of asphaltum and hold up to twelve people. A similar boat is the Chumash tomol. The Tongva and Chumash are unique in being the only two nations in the region with plank canoes of this kind.

== Land ==
After the establishment of Spanish missions in California and the California genocide, all of Tovaangar has been taken out of the Tongva's stewardship. The Tongva Taraxat Paxaavxa Conservancy has been established for the rematriation of Tongva homelands. In 2022, a 1-acre site (0.40 ha) was returned to the conservancy in Altadena, which marked the first time the Tongva had land under their stewardship in Los Angeles County in nearly two-hundred years.

== Villages ==
=== Los Angeles County ===
==== San Fernando Valley ====
- Achooykomenga
- Ashaawanga
- Cahuenga
- Ceegenga
- Momonga
- Muhunga
- Okowvinjha
- Pakoinga
- Pasheeknga
- Pimocagna
- Puntitavjatngna
- Quapa
- Saway-yanga
- Sheshiikuanungna
- Siutcanga
- Totonga
- Tuyunga

Outskirts

- Jucjauynga
- Juyunga
- Najabatanga
- Puninga
- Wikangna

==== San Gabriel Valley ====
- Alyeupkigna
- Awigna
- Azucsagna
- Hahamongna
- Isanthcogna
- Jajamonga
- Momwahomomutngna
- Pemookangna
- Shevaanga
- Sibanga
- Sonagna
- Tooypinga
- Torojoatngna
- Toviscanga
- Uchibit
- Weniinga

Outskirts

- Haramoknga
- Joatngna

==== Westside/Central ====
- Comicranga
- Geveronga
- Guashna
- Kuruvungna
- Maugna
- Ongobehangna
- Otsungna
- Topanga
- Yaanga

==== Gateway Cities ====
- Chokishgna
- Houtngna
- Huutngna
- Juyubit
- Nacaugna
- Puvunga
- Sejat
- Seobit
- Suangna
- Tajauta
- Tibagna

==== South Bay ====
- Aataveanga
- Chowigna
- Engvangna
- Huachongna
- Kiinkenga
- Moniikanga
- Ongovanga
- Suangna
- Toovemonga
- Tsauvinga
- Unavnga
- Xuuxonga

=== Orange County ===
- Genga
- Hutuknga
- Lupukngna
- Motuucheyngna
- Moyongna
- Pajbenga
- Pamajam
- Puhú
- Totpavit

=== San Bernardino County ===
- Homhoangna
- Horuuvnga
- Kaawchama
- Kuukamonga
- Pasinogna
- Wa'atsngna
- Wapijanga

=== Riverside County ===
- Horuuvngna
- Pahavgna
- Paxauxa
- Shiishongna

=== Channel Islands ===
- Haraasnga
  - Xaraashnga
- Kinkipar
  - Guinguina
- Pimuu'nga
  - Naayxoxar
  - Pipiimar
- Tchunashngna
