= Guashna =

Former Tongva village at Playa Vista, Los Angeles

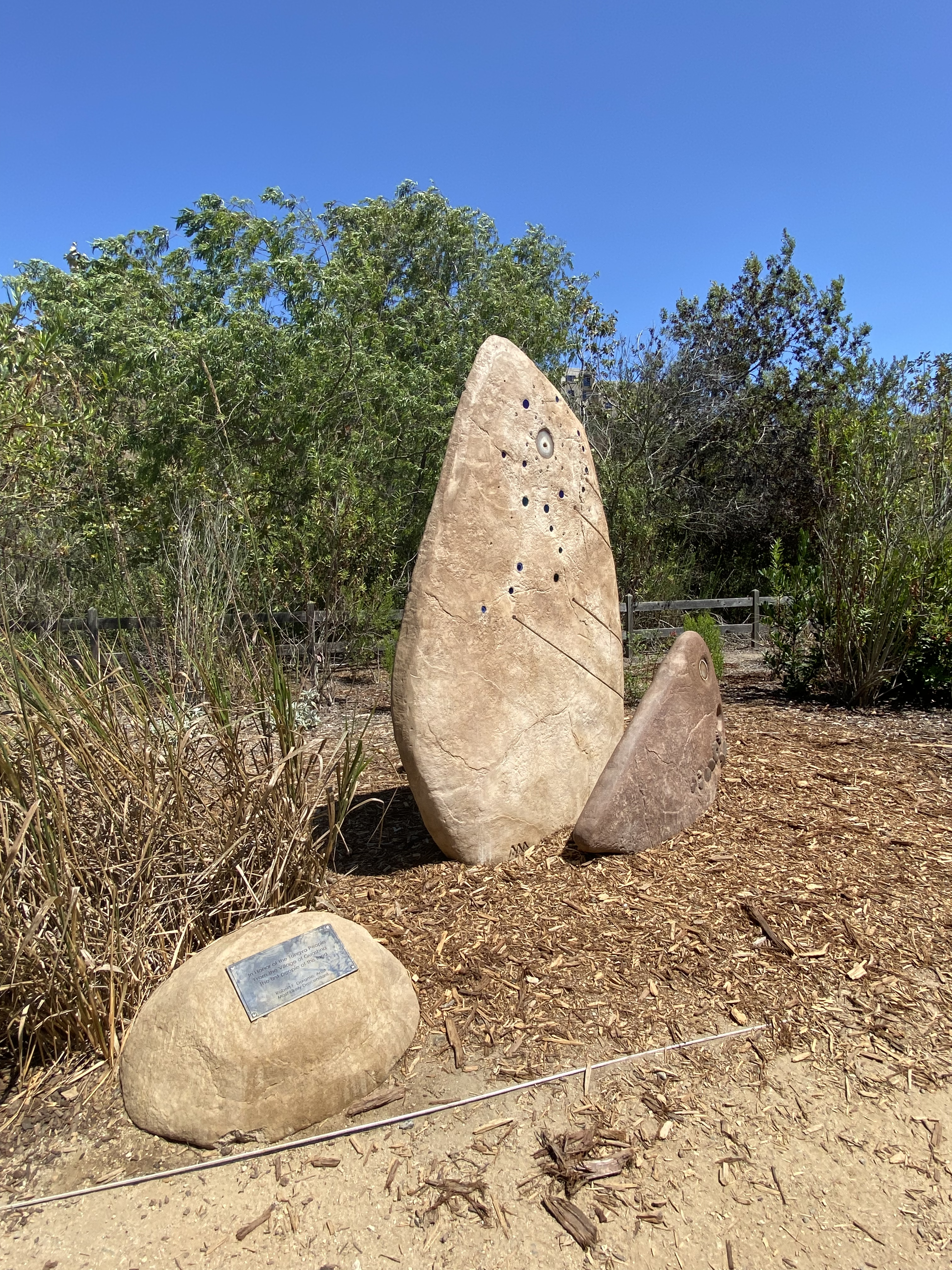
Monument to Guashna at Ballona Discovery Park in the Playa Vista neighborhood.

Guashna was a Tongva village located at Playa Vista, Los Angeles at the mouth of Ballona Creek. The site has also been referred to as Sa'angna (or some variation thereof), with various sources debating whether Sa'angna, meaning "place of tar," was a regional referent rather than a village name or whether it was a separate nearby village. The initial place name was said to be Sa'an; the village suffix "ngna" was added by Bernice Johnston to her 1962 map of Gabrieleño villages "despite her having found no mention of the term in baptismal records." Sa'angna is also not to be confused with Suangna. The Tongva referred to the Ballona Wetlands as Pwinukipar, meaning "full of water." Another alternate name may be Waachnga.

Prior to the arrival of European settlers, tar located near the village, possibly at what was later renamed Baldwin Hill, was an important resource for the village in the construction of te'aats and for trade. In 2004, four-hundred burials in the area were unearthed in the construction of a drainage ditch in the Playa Vista development. The Tongva had little power to prevent the desecration despite numerous protests.

== History ==
=== Prosperous village ===
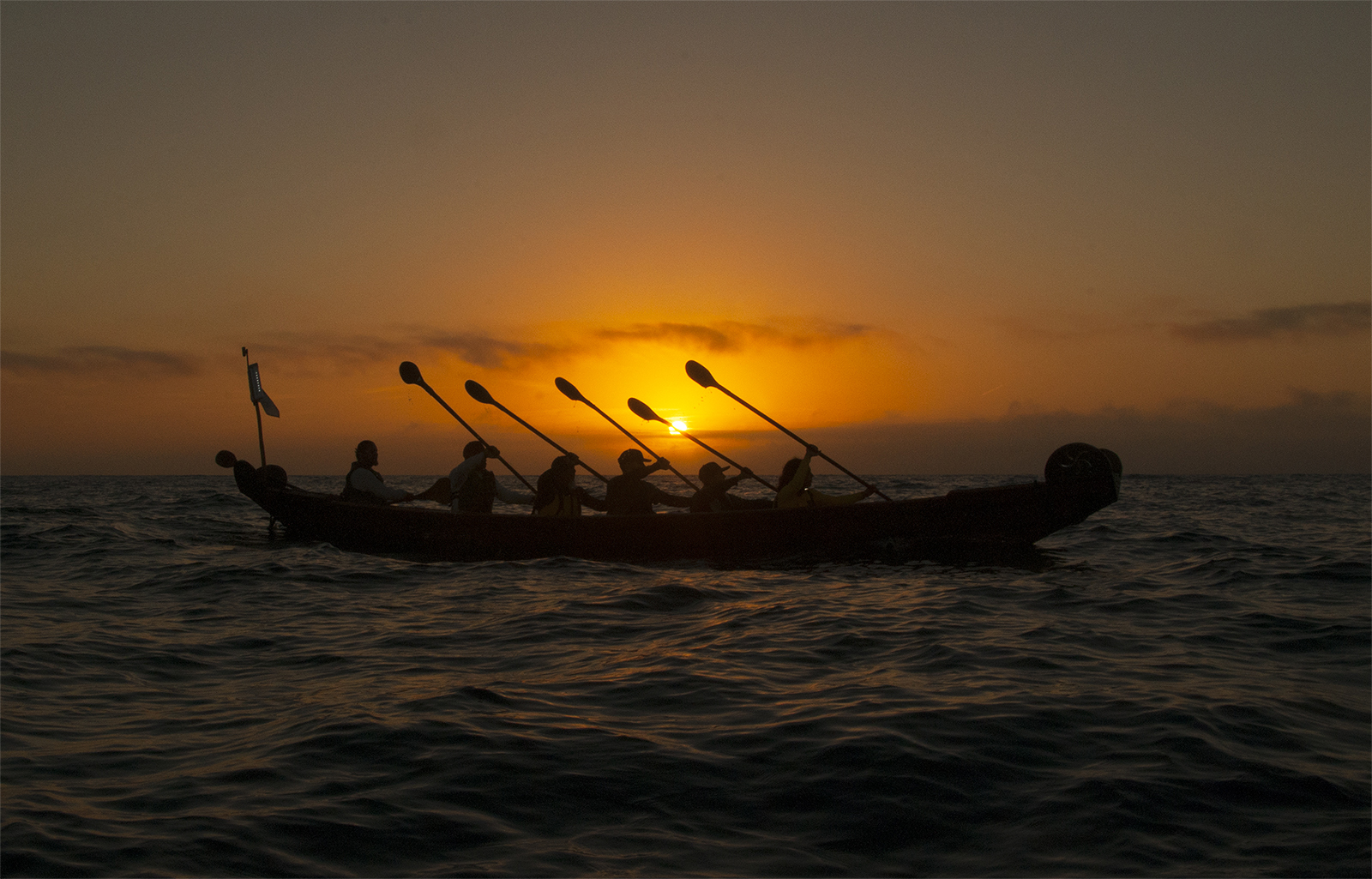
Tar was used in the construction of plank boats known as te'aats or tomols (pictured) unique to the Tongva and Chumash as the only seafaring vessels of their kind along the West Coast.

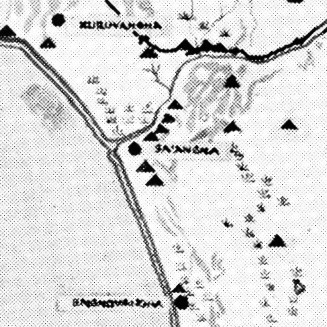
Detail of Bernice Johnston's 1962 map showing Gabrieleño settlements in the Ballona watershed, including what she called "Sa'angna," as well as Koruu'vanga to the north and 'Ongoova'nga along the coast to the south

Tar was reportedly an important resource of Guashna, which was used in trade with numerous neighboring villages and for the Tongva's production of te'aats to navigate the coastline.

The village was a point of departure to the island of Pimu (renamed Santa Catalina by the Spanish), which is located about twenty two miles from the village site, that had economic and cultural significance. Tongva's prosperous villages on the island would trade quarried soapstone, pierced white shell, abalone, and sea otter skins. Evidence of this trade can be found as far east as the native Pueblo peoples of what is now New Mexico. No other village throughout mainland Tovaangar was as important for coastal trade and connection with the islands.

The coastal village of Puvunga was a major regional trading center located about 20 mi (32 km) down the coastline.

=== Colonization ===
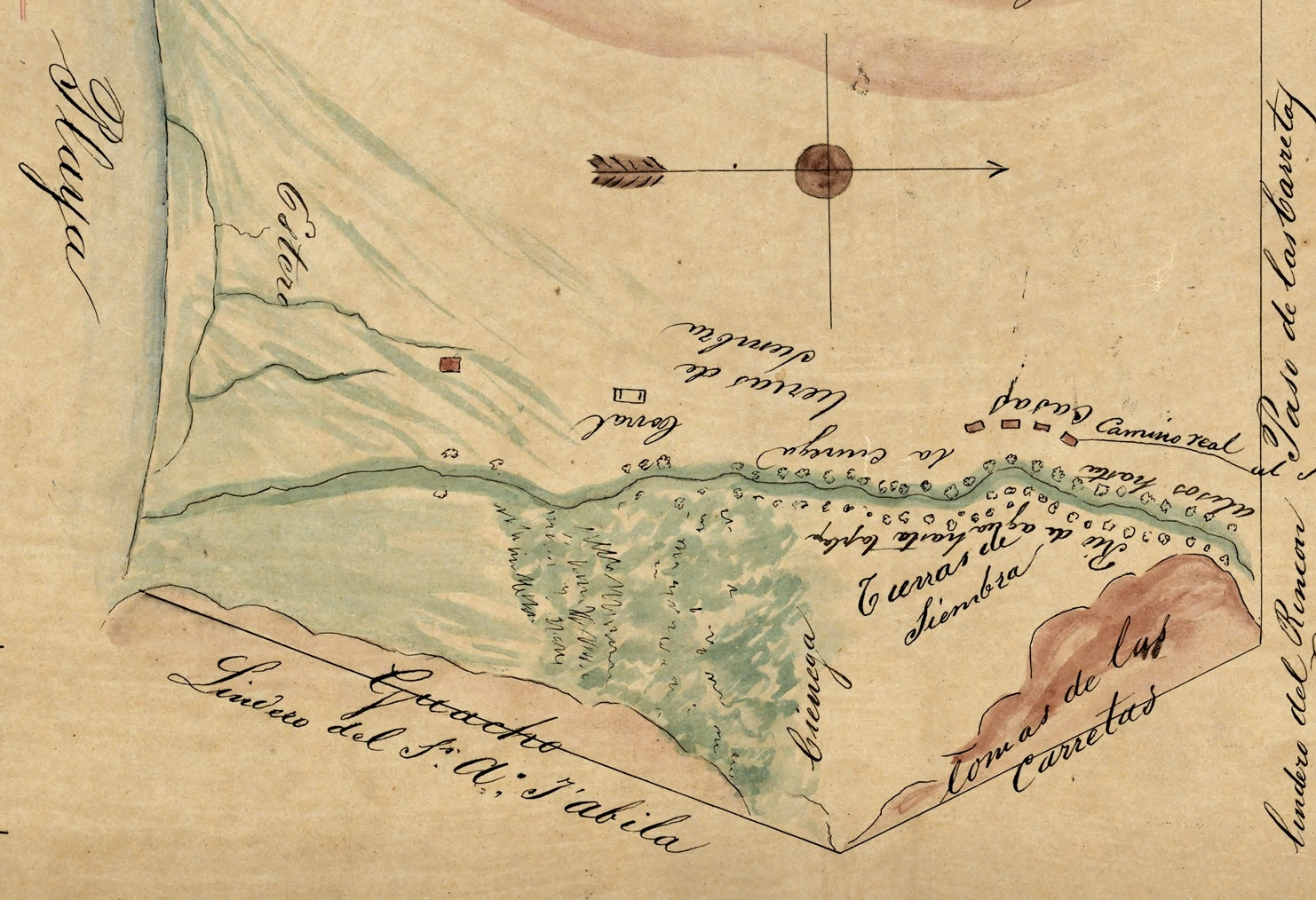
Two different versions of the diseño for Rancho La Ballona label the Westchester Bluffs as Gaucho, a name researchers have connected to Guashna

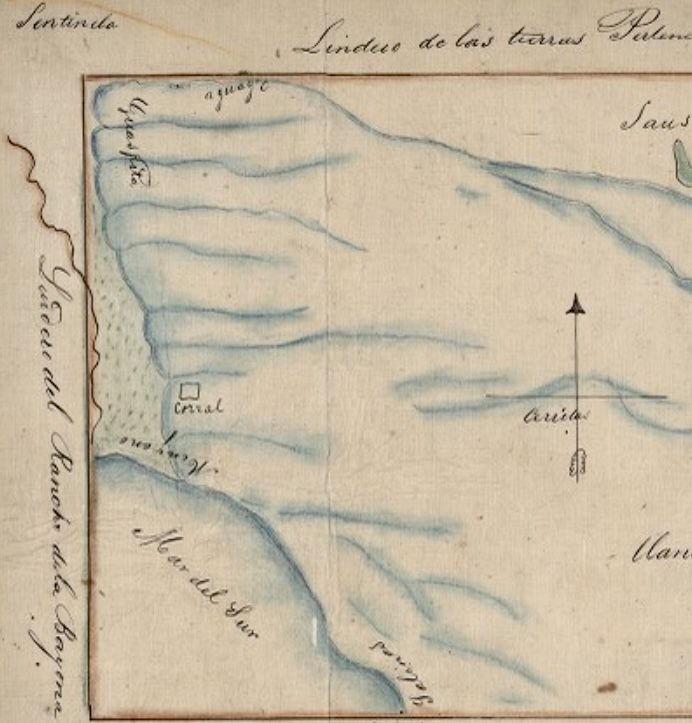
UC Berkeley's Bancroft Library holds a copy of Rancho Sausal Redondo diseño that shows the predecessor grant Rancho Gauspita was to the north, above the Bayona on the way to Sentinela, and Rancho Salinas was to the south (roughly Hermosa Beach)

Like other Tongva villages in the area, the village declined with the arrival of Spanish missionaries and soldiers. The villagers were brought to Mission San Gabriel, where they were baptized and forced to work in conditions that were identified by third-party observers as being slavery "in every sense of the word."

At Mission San Gabriel, there were a total of 7,854 baptisms (2,459 children) and 5,656 deaths (2,916 children) until secularization in 1834, indicating a very high rate of death. Children often died very young at the missions. One missionary reported that three out of every four children born at nearby Mission San Gabriel died before reaching the age of two.

In the 1820s, while the villagers were at Mission San Gabriel and the village had been depleted, the governor of Alta California granted the land area, referred to as Guaspita, a variant of Guashna, as "a land grant received by Antonio Ignacio Ávila, which later was combined with the Salinas land grant to become Rancho Sausal Redondo, present-day Westchester." Mission registers of the era show a number of entries for people from Guasna and Guashna, or Guaspet, Guachpet, or Guashpet (-pet being a suffix that indicated someone was a person from a certain place.)

In W. W. Robinson's 1939 history of the area he wrote:

On old maps the cliffs of Ballona's easterly boundary are labeled Guacho, sometimes Huacho, an Indian term meaning high place, according to Cristobal Machado of Culver City, whose memory of La Ballona Valley goes back to Indian days. It was against these cliffs that the Indians built their brush-and-mud huts. From them the brown-skinned men went forth to gather clams and shell fish at the beach beyond the lagoon, to hunt small game in the marshes and to find edible berries, seeds and insects in the river growth and on hillside shrubs...The work of the ranch was done by the local Indians, one group of whom had their huts among the sycamores not far from Augustin's home [north of the creek at Overland, facing what is now Jefferson], another group having their village against the cliffs beneath the present-day Loyola University.

The village is identified as Gaucha on George W. Kirkman's Pictorial and Historical Map of Los Angeles County from 1938.

=== Development ===
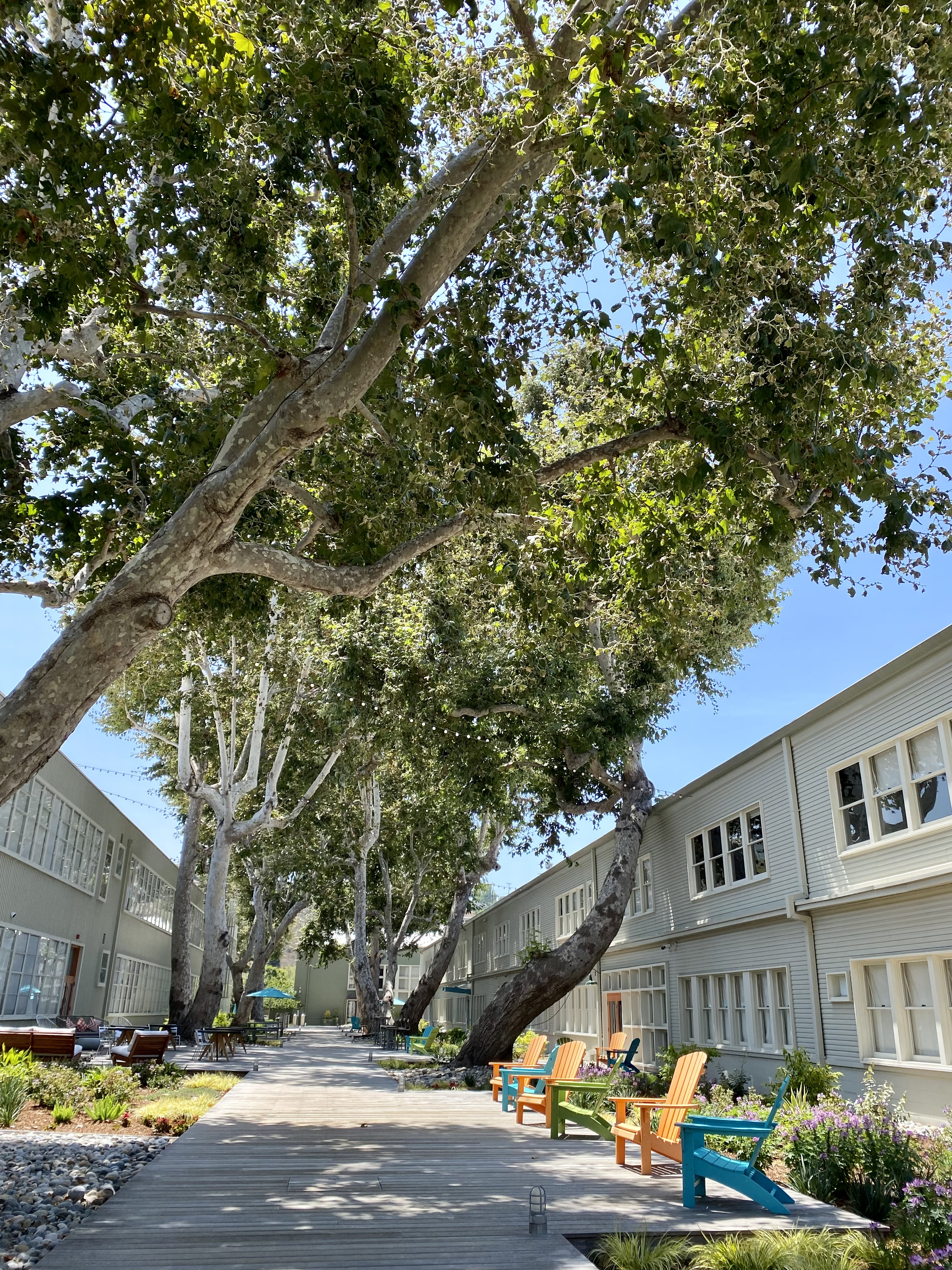
Howard Hughes centered his airport buildings around an allée of native Western sycamores; their trunk circumferences suggest they date to the early 19th century

Until the 1960s, the village site was primarily used for cropland by the Machado family, remaining a natural spreading floodplain of Ballona Creek. Developments increasingly encroached on the agricultural area where the village site was located as Los Angeles sprawled outward.

In the 1990s, protests began to protect the village site from what was to be DreamWorks Studios at Playa Vista. After an environmentalist's hunger strike, director Steven Spielberg decided to not build the studio at that site.

In 2004, the construction of a drainage ditch for the Playa Vista development unearthed four hundred ancestral remains or burials in the area. California cemetery statutes that stem back to the 1850s, amidst the California Genocide, strategically excluded the protection of native cemeteries or burial grounds from desecration. The village site was disturbed for commercial and residential development without protection. As a non-federally recognized tribe, the Tongva had little control over their ancestral remains or artifacts to stop the development.

In 2005, "Phase II" of the Playa Vista development threatened to destroy the site. Continued developments in the area continue to threaten further destruction of the site as of 2021. A lithic monument to the people of Guashna was designed by Robert Dorame; the stone has geode and blue glass embedded within. The blue glass is in the pattern of Orion's Belt, paahe-sheshi-iyot in Tongva.

== See also ==
- Genga
- Lupukngna
- Moyongna
- Yaanga
