= Momonga =

Momonga may refer to:

- Japanese dwarf flying squirrel (Pteromys momonga), one of two species of Old World flying squirrels in the genus Pteromys
  - Momonga, a character from Chiikawa, a flying squirrel
- Momonga (village), a Tongva village located at what is now Chatsworth, Los Angeles
- Ainz Ooal Gown, also known as Momonga, the protagonist of the light novel series Overlord

== See also ==
- Momonga Standing and Loop Coaster, a roller coaster at Yomiuriland in Inagi, Tokyo
