= Horuuvngna =

Tongva village in Jurupa Oak

Horuuvngna was a Tongva village located in Jurupa, California, within what would become the boundaries of Rancho Jurupa, which includes both Riverside and San Bernardino Counties.

== Background ==
The village was placed on maps of the area as being north of the village of Wapijanga in the eastern outreaches of Tovaangar, or the homelands of the Tongva, meaning that it was located in San Bernardino County. The name of the village likely reflects the origins of the name Jurupa, which has been described as the Tongva language word for the California Sagebrush: hurúuvar.
