= Quapa =

Quapa is a former Tongva village located in Encino or the San Fernando Valley in Los Angeles County, California. It was one of several villages located within the San Fernando Valley area, including Kowanga, Mapipinga, Okowvinja, Pascegna, Saway-yanga, Tacuenga, and Tuyunga.

The general location of the village was recorded by Padre Santa Maria in 1796, though it is claimed that he was inaccurate. Hugo Reid who had married a Gabrielina, claimed it had been part of Mission San Gabriel.

In 1833, after the mission was secularized, it was recorded that 2,784 native people were baptized, 1,367 of whom were children, from 1797 to 1833. At the end of this period, around 400 native people survived to the end of the mission period. Many of the native people moved to surrounding communities in the area.

== See also ==
- Toviscanga
- Yaanga
- Category: Tongva populated places
  - Tongva language
- California mission clash of cultures
