= Holland Summit, California =

Holland Summit
- Former settlement
- Location in California
- Coordinates: 34°48′02″N 118°52′24″W
- Country: United States
- State: California
- County: Los Angeles County
- Elevation: 4,147 ft (1,264 m)

Holland Summit is an archaic placename in Los Angeles County, California at the "summit of summit of the incline on the Gorman Post Road," better known as the Ridge Route. It lay at an elevation of 4147 feet (1264 m). Holland Summit still appeared on USGS maps as of 1947, and Holland Summit Café was a restaurant and rest stop at the location in that era. Holland Summit lies between Gorman and Lebec along Old Highway 99. Holland Summit was marketed as a "convenient stop on the way north from Los Angeles to San Joaquin Valley and the National Parks and High Sierra points".

== See also ==
- 99 Oaks, California
- Tejon Pass
- U.S. Route 99 in California § History
