= Sidney P. Dones =

American businessman

Sidney Preston Dones (1888 – August 2, 1947) was an American businessman involved in real estate, insurance, legal services, and the film business. Sidney P. Dones Company was on 8th and Central next to the California Eagle.

== Biography ==
He was born in Marshall, Texas on February 18, 1888 to Doctor Deltor Dones and Lucy Dones née Gray. He attended rural public schools until he was fifteen years old when he decided to pursue a higher education. By the time he was sixteen he was tested for and admitted to Wiley College in Marshall where he graduated, mastering an English course. He continued his studies until his father died, after which he had to assume responsibility of his family.

In 1905, he moved to Los Angeles, California to work as a day laborer to further support his family. While in Los Angeles, he decided to pursue business using the education that he had received. He moved to El Paso, Texas in 1906 and unsuccessfully tried to establish and African American colony in Mexico, after which he returned to Los Angeles. He continued his studies at LaSalle Extension University School of Law, and National Business College.

On returning to Los Angeles, he entered the local business scene in 1907 and prospered as a real estate and insurance agent. He would also become the first colored man licensed as a pawnbroker in California. He married Lavinia H. Relerford and then musician Bessie Williams on June 18, 1913 with whom he had a child, Sydnetta.

In 1914, Dones established the Sidney P. Dones Company and opened his office on Central Avenue and 8th Street in Los Angeles next to the office of the African American newspaper, the California Eagle. The company dealt mainly in real estate but also offered insurance and legal services from black attorney C.A. Jones. In early 1916, Dones opened the Booker T. Washington Building at 10th Street and Central Avenue. It was a three-story building with shops on the first level and offices and apartments above; it provided spaces for Black business people. He was at the vanguard of African Americans involved in Los Angeles real estate. In 1927 he was jailed for usury.

Dones also became involved in the film industry as an actor in Leslie T. Peacocke's films Injustice in 1919 and Reformation in 1920. He directed the 1921 film The Ten Thousand Dollar Trail.

In 1924 Dones, along with other prominent African American investors, bought 1,000 acres near the Santa Clarita Valley to develop into tracts of land for a vacation resort for African Americans. The community was named Eureka Villa and featured recreational amenities that were not usually available to African Americans because of racial segregation. This community would later develop into the current community of Val Verde.

He unsuccessfully ran as a Republican candidate for the Los Angeles City Council in the mid-1910s. He later ran for political office as an Independent and as a Progressive.

On April 15, 1943, a complaint was filed on behalf of eight white homeowners in Sugar Hill against eleven black residents demanding that racially restrictive covenants be sustained and that the defendants be evicted. This case was directed against Done's daughter Sydnetta Dones Smith who had bought the house at 2045 South Hobart Boulevard years after the seller signed a covenant prohibiting the occupancy of homes by people of color; Sidney P. Dones also stood out as one of the defendants. Little over a month later, the defendants responded to the lawsuit by arguing that the racial covenants violated the 14th Amendment of the United States Constitution as well as the California State Constitution. Similar litigation continued in the neighborhood and the proceedings consolidated under Anderson v. Auseth which would come to be known as the Sugar Hill case. Los Angeles Superior Court Judge Thurmond Clarke saw the covenants as an infringements upon citizen's constitutional rights and dismissed the suit.

Dones died at the age of 59 on August 2, 1947 in Los Angeles.

== Filmography ==
=== Actor ===
- Injustice (1919)
- Reformation (1919)

=== Director ===
- The Ten Thousand Dollar Trail (1921).
