= Wa'atsngna =

Tongva village in California

Wa'atsngna was a Tongva village located in the far eastern reaches of Tovaangar, or the Tongva world, in what is now the northwestern outskirts of the city of San Bernardino along Lytle Creek. The village was located close to Wa'aachnga, located in what is now Loma Linda, California.

In 1997, the village was identified as being several miles northwest of the San Bernardino power plant on the east side of Lytle Creek. The closest Tongva villages were Homnga, which was a few miles south located along the Santa Ana River, followed by Hurungna (from which the name Jurupa is derived), which was several miles west. This would situate the village in the northwestern outskirts of the city of San Bernardino.
