= Achooykomenga =

Former Tongva settlement in San Fernando, California, US

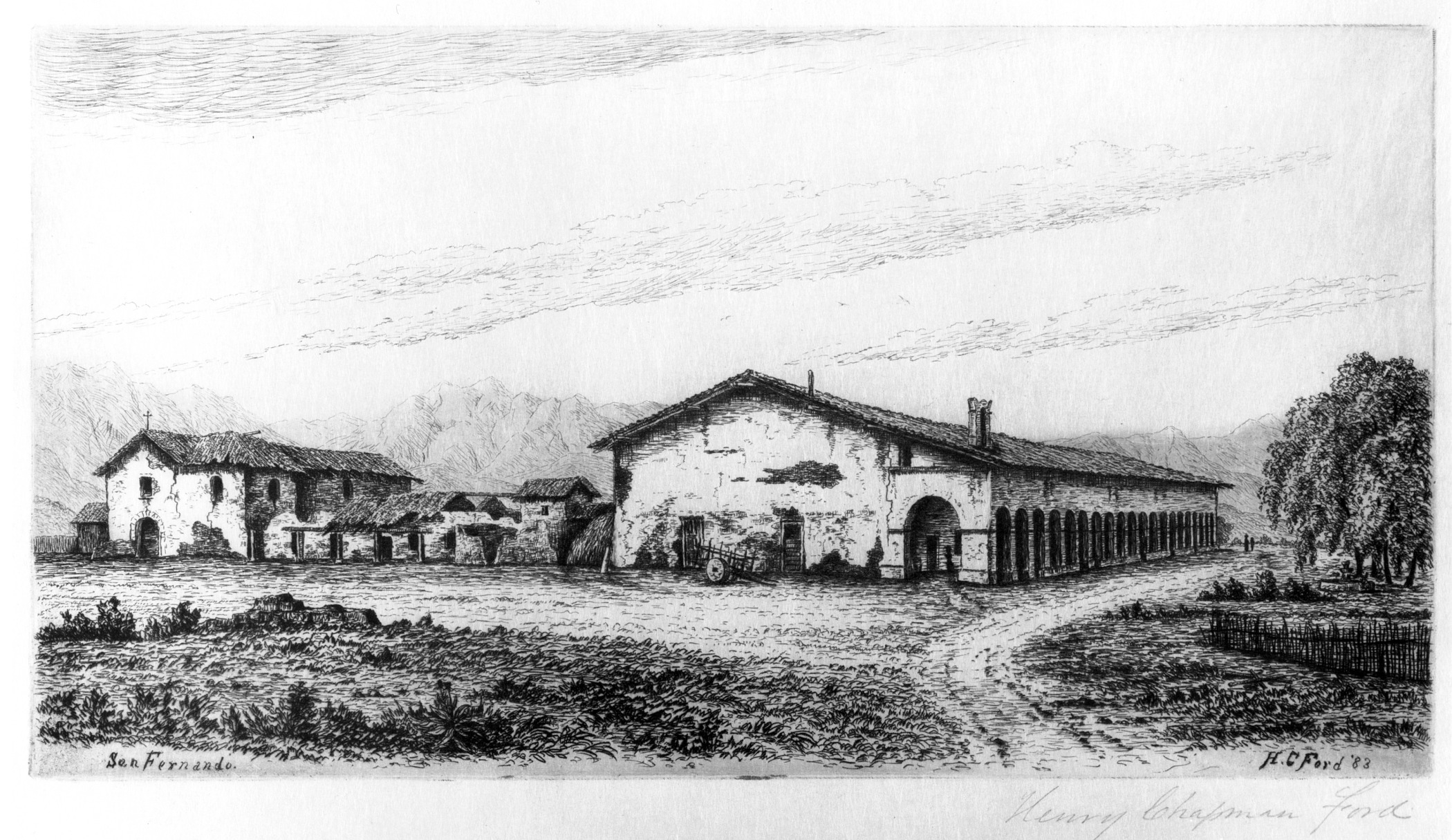
Achooykomenga and the nearby village of Pasheeknga are referred to as the site of Mission San Fernando when it was founded in 1797.

Achooykomenga (Hispanicized: Achoicominga or Achoycomihabit) is a former settlement that was located at the site of Mission San Fernando Rey de España before it was founded in 1797. Prior to the mission's founding, in the 1780s, it functioned as a shared native settlement for an agricultural rancho of Pueblo de Los Ángeles that was worked by Ventureño Chumash, Fernandeño (Tongva), and Tataviam laborers.

The nearby Tongva village of Pasheeknga (alternatively Pasecgna, Pasheckno, Pasheckna, or Passenga) was located just upstream and is also included as part of the site of the mission's founding due to its close proximity. The village may have been the most populous native village in the San Fernando Valley.

== History ==
Prior to the arrival of Spanish soldiers and missionaries, the sites of Achooykomenga and Pasheeknga were at the northwestern edge of Tovaangar, or the Tongva world, closely located to the nearby traditional homelands of the Tataviam to the north and the village of Tochonanga. Hubert Howe Bancroft identified the village of Pasheeknga as a distinct clan from the nearby clans of Okowvinjha, Kowanga (Cahuenga), and Saway-yanga.

=== Agricultural rancho ===
The Spanish likely entered the area in the 1770s. In 1784, much of the San Fernando Valley was provisionally granted as the Rancho Los Encinos to Juan Francisco Reyes, a former soldado de cuera and one of the first colonizers of the newly founded Spanish colonial settlement of Los Ángeles. The ranchería of Achooykomenga was established as a labor camp for the indigenous Chumash, Tongva, and Tataviam people who were resettled there as agricultural laborers for the rancho.

In 1797, the rancho was selected as the site of Mission San Fernando Rey de España by Spanish missionaries. As a result, Reyes ceded the land to the missionaries and relocated the rancho to a square Spanish league of land in the southern valley. He was later granted more land near Mission La Purísima to the north in what is now Lompoc, California. Upon visiting the site, missionaries recorded: "In this place we came to a rancheria [Achooykomenga] near the dwelling of said Reyes – with enough Indians."

=== Mission San Fernando ===
The mission was founded at the site on September 8, 1797, by Friar Fermín de Lasuén. By the end of the year, 55 people were baptized at the mission, while by the end of the century 352 people had been baptized.

The first people baptized at the mission after its founding were all native children of the agricultural workers who labored for Reyes, many of whose parents were from Achooykomenga and the nearby Tongva village of Momonga located in what is now Chatsworth, Los Angeles. "The first group of ten children baptized on the day the mission was established were said to be from Achooykomenga."

At total of 22 people from Achooykomenga and 32 people from Pasheeknga were baptized at Mission San Fernando between 1797 and 1801, indicating that the settlements were quickly absorbed after the founding of the mission.

In 1803, the founder of the mission Fermín de Lasuén indicated that attempts at conversion were largely unsuccessful, and thus the presence or threat of violent force was necessary:

Generally the neophytes have not yet enough affection for Christianity and civilization. Most of them are excessively fond of the mountains, the beach, and of barbarous freedom and independence, so that some show of military force is necessary, lest they by force of arms deny the Faith and law which they have professed.

In 1819, the native population at the mission peaked at 1,080 people. By the time of secularization in 1833, 1,367 native children had been baptized at the mission, in which 965 died at the mission (or over 70% of the children) in childhood. "It was not strange that the fearful death rate both of children and adults at the missions sometimes frightened the neophytes into running away."

== See also ==
- Acjacheme (the site of Mission San Juan Capistrano)
- Toviscanga (the site of Mission San Gabriel)
- Yaanga (the site of Pueblo de Los Ángeles)

== Bibliography ==
- Bearchell, Charles; Fried, Larry D. (1988). The San Fernando Valley Then and Now. Windsor Publications. ISBN 0897812859.
- Pauley, Kenneth E.; Pauley, Carol M. (2005). San Fernando, Rey de España: an illustrated history. Spokane, Washington: Arthur H. Clark Company.
