= Humaliwo =

Former Chumash village in California

Humaliwo was a Chumash village located in present-day Malibu, California. Humaliwo meant 'where the surf sounds loudly'. The village occupied a hill across from the lagoon in Malibu Lagoon State Beach. The neighboring Tongva referred to the village as Ongobehangna. The Humaliwo village was recorded on the National Register of Historic Places (NRHP) in 1976. Cultural remains are present at this site, consisting of numerous human burials, artifacts and other cultural materials. Sections of the site can be dated to 7,000 years old.

== Chumash ==
=== Culture ===
Archeological evidence has shown that there is a correlation between mortuary practices and the social organization of Chumash people. There is evidence that shows that the Chumash people lived in large, relatively dense communities. These communities are controlled by a hierarchy of chiefs and other elite figures. They are protected by the armed men who also work to feed him. One way that chiefs have been identified is if they were in polygynous relationships with two or three women because the commoners tended to only have one spouse. This tradition stopped after the colonization of the Spanish because polygyny was deemed a sin by the Catholic church. It seems to be clear that the bodies of these chiefs are demarcated by a significant number of beads placed upon them at the funeral. It is also shown in the literature that wealthy or elite Chumash people were buried together on family plots. This showed archeologists the importance of family in their society and how it tied to class and wealth as well. The Chumash often traded natural resources such as shell beads with their neighbors, the Tongva and Acjachemen.

=== Habitual exploitation and recourses ===
The history of Chumash people living along the Santa Barbara Channel area goes back millennia, at least eleven thousand according to archaeological data. They inhabited various spaces of the California Coast such as the mainland of the Santa Barbara Channel, the inner valleys, and even the islands between Malibu and San Luis Obispo. The abundance and variety of resources from the coastal waters, terrestrial surroundings, and domesticated plants and animals allowed them to not only remain stable, but thrive on this land. Post-colonization, the land began to suffer from droughts or resource shortages due to the conditions it fell to under European colonization. These issues were caused by overpopulation, exploitation of resources, and unstable climate conditions.

=== Territory ===
Human lineage on Santa Rosa island trace the northern migration of seafaring people to the Channel Islands 13,000 year ago. The Hokan-speaking people navigated between the Channel Islands and California mainland. Among the Uto-Aztecan villages in the Los Angeles area, the Chumash pavajmkar meaning “in the water”, had territory from San Luis Obispo south to Topanga Canyon Topaa’nga in present-day Malibu Maliwu across the Santa Barbara channel to the Islands of Santa Cruz Limuw (Mishmash by the mainland language), Anacapa Anyapakh, San Miguel Island Tuqan, and Santa Rosa Island Wi'ma. The Chumash population size was between 15,000-20,000 prior to Spanish contact. Neighboring Villages of Humaliwu include Malibu Canyon Ta’lopop, Point Dume Sumo, Lechuza Canyon Loxostox’ni, Westlake Village Hipuk, Conejo Grade Lalimanux, and El Escopion Huwam.

=== Tomols ===
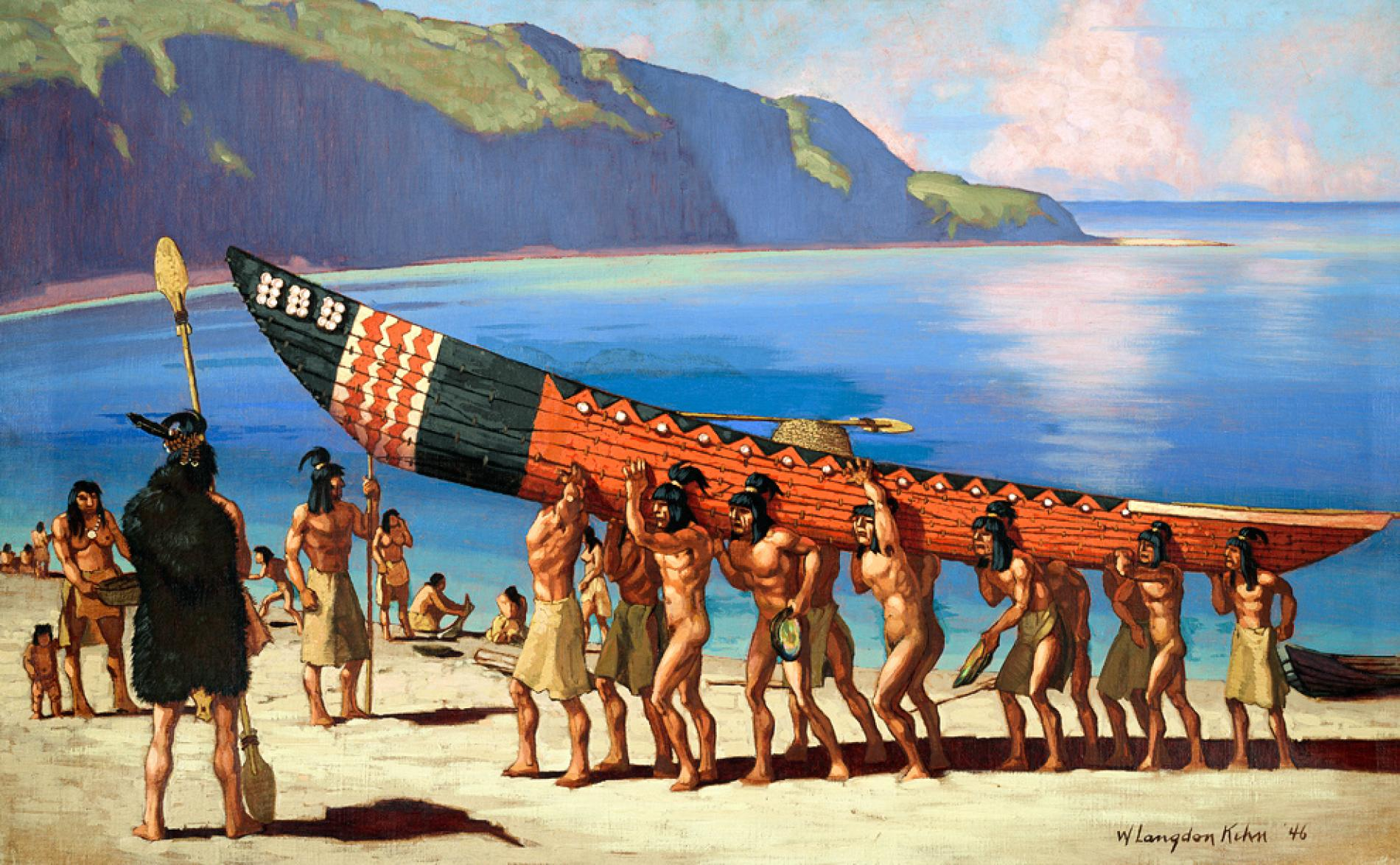
Chumash Tomol

Point Mugu Muwu meaning "beach" was a launching site for tomols, an ethnographic estimated half day's passage to the east edge of Santa Cruz island. Humaliwo village was the landing site for the P’imu or P’imungna (Catalina Island) Ti’at plank canoes. The Chumash tomols, are the oldest known form of ocean-going watercraft existing in North America. Formed from redwood, Chumash gathered driftwood along the coast. Yop, a tar-like substance of pine pitch and asphaltum, sealed the animal sinew fastened planks to create canoes. Tomols opened access to marine and terrestrial resources, while establishing available trade routes. The plank canoes reached fully modified form by A.D 1100- 1150. Ownership and use of tomols garnered a higher social status.

=== Burial rituals in relation to social class ===
The type of funeral that is held to mourn a deceased member of society is indicative of their wealth and social class. People often leave symbolic burial offerings at graves that display their role in society. For example, friends and family may leave a piece of a canoe at a canoe makers grave.

Burial of a commoner: An average person, or commoner, might have a very simple funeral with only close friends and family. They typically did not have a lot of possessions put into their graves. Most of their possessions were burned, in order to destroy all memories of a person. The graves of commoners were also typically unmarked, as they did not have the money to afford it.

Periodic Mourning Ceremony: The Chumash people would hold a large ceremony once every few years to commemorate all of the commoners who had passed since the last one. Since this ceremony is designed to honor so many people, it is very elaborate, and may take up to two years to save up enough resources to have a proper ceremony.

Burial of someone socially important: In contrast to the average member of society's bare funeral, someone of great social significance would have a much larger, more elaborate, and more expensive ceremony. Roles considered to be important were that of the chief, religious figures, or other wealthy members of society. There would be a public mourning ceremony, and many people would attend instead of just immediate family. A chief would likely be buried with many lengths of beads, and a fur cape to indicate his status. The more beads in a grave, the wealthier the or more important the person must have been. In contrast to the simple, unmarked grave a commoner would have, someone important would have a large pole placed upon their grave to denote significance. There is also evidence that shows Chumash people maintained family burial sites, and that the location of their grave was of great social significance.

Aqi, or undertakers, were typically either third-gender males or post-menopausal women. The Chumash chose people for this role who did not have the ability to reproduce, so that they would not fall into harm from pollutants used during various ceremonial processes.

Position of body: Chumash bodies are typically buried with their head facing in a Southwest direction, presumably so the spirit of the individual could travel over the ocean to the land of the dead.

== Malibu regional history ==
=== Spanish European Activity: 1542-1770s ===
On October 1–13, 1542, explorer Juan Rodríguez Cabrillo anchored at Malibu Lagoon and claimed the land for the King of Spain. He named the lagoon “Pueblo de las Canoas” (Town of the Canoes), referring to the vast Humaliwo canoes on arrival to the coastline. Cabrillo's expedition to the edge of Mesoamerica ended with his death on Catalina Island in 1543.

On February 22, 1776, Spanish explorer Juan Bautista de Anza led an expedition that camped at Malibu Creek.

=== Franciscan missions in Chumash territory: 1769 – 1834 ===
Of the twenty-one Franciscan missions, the Chumash peoples played a significant part in creating the Mission San Buenaventura, Mission Santa Barbara, and Mission Santa Inés. The Spanish invaders exploited Chumash land and began to raise livestock while using Chumash resources such as shell beads for currency. Several accounts describing the Spanish and Chumash encounter explain how the Chumash welcomed the Spanish, prior to colonization, with food and entertainment such as dancing and singing.

1772	San Luis Obispo
1782	San Buenaventura
1786	Santa Barbara
1787	La Purisima Concepcion
1804	Santa Ynez

All Inhabitants of Humaliwo were removed into the following missions by 1805.

=== Mexican-American California ===
Following the Mexican Independence of 1821, Mexican rule existed in California from 1822 to 1848. The Mexican government encouraged settlement of Alta California by giving prominent men large land grants called "ranchos". In the 1800s, Jose Bartolome Tapia, a member of the 1776 Spanish expedition, was granted the 13,330-acre (5,390-hectare) Rancho Topanga Malibu Sequit, "Rancho Malibu", as a reward for his service to Spain. Jose Tapia owned the rancho until 1848, when it was sold to Leon Victor Prudhomme. This was during the transition period of Mexican to United States rule over California.

After 1848 Mexican American War was ended by the Treaty of Guadalupe Hidalgo, Mexico ceded Alta California to the United States. In the Land Claims Act of 1851, the United States chose to disregard those articles of the treaty that promised to honor the ownership of existing Spanish and Mexican land grants. Rancho Topanga Malibu Sequit could not document the Tapia title and the claim was rejected. In 1857, Matthew Keller (also known as Don Mateo Keller) purchased the entire property from the Prudhommes for $1,400, or about 10 cents an acre.

On October 24, 1864, Keller's claim to Rancho Malibu was confirmed. By 1892, Frederick Hastings Rindge and May Knight Rindge, the fourth and last owners of the entire Rancho Malibu, purchased the 13,330-acre tract.

=== The Adamson House ===
California Historical Landmark and National Register of Historic Places. The Adamson House was constructed by Rindge daughter Rhoda Rindge Adamson & her husband Merritt Adamson in 1929. Adamson House and Malibu Lagoon Museum is located on Vaquero Hill, just east of the Malibu Lagoon, which had served for generations as a trash dump and burial ground for the native Chumash people.

=== Recounting histories ===
Although many Chumash elders recorded much of their history and interactions with Europeans through ethnographic data, published accounts have been translated and told by non-Native scholars. Early stories often portrayed the Chumash people as primitive or even an extinct people whose culture was gone.

== Bibliography ==
- GREEN, TERISA M. (April 16, 2018). "Archaeological Evidence for Post-Contact Native Religion: The Chumash Land of the Dead". Journal of California and Great Basin Anthropology. 23 (2). Malki Museum: 319–328. JSTOR 27825769.
- Davis, Mike (April 16, 1995). "The Case for Letting Malibu Burn". Environmental History Review. 19 (2). Oxford University Press on behalf of Forest History Society and American Society for Environmental History: 1–36. doi:10.2307/3984830. JSTOR 3984830. S2CID 158026230.
