= Paxauxa =

Former Tongva and Payómkawichum village

Paxauxa was a shared Tongva and Payómkawichum village site located at what is now Corona, California along Temescal Creek. Villagers may have appeared in baptismal records at Mission San Juan Capistrano as being from the village Axaxa. Nearby villages included Poruumanga and Shiishongna. It is sometimes alternatively spelled Pakhavka.

== Etymology ==
The village name may have been derived from the Tongva language word Axawknga, roughly translated to "in the net."

== History ==
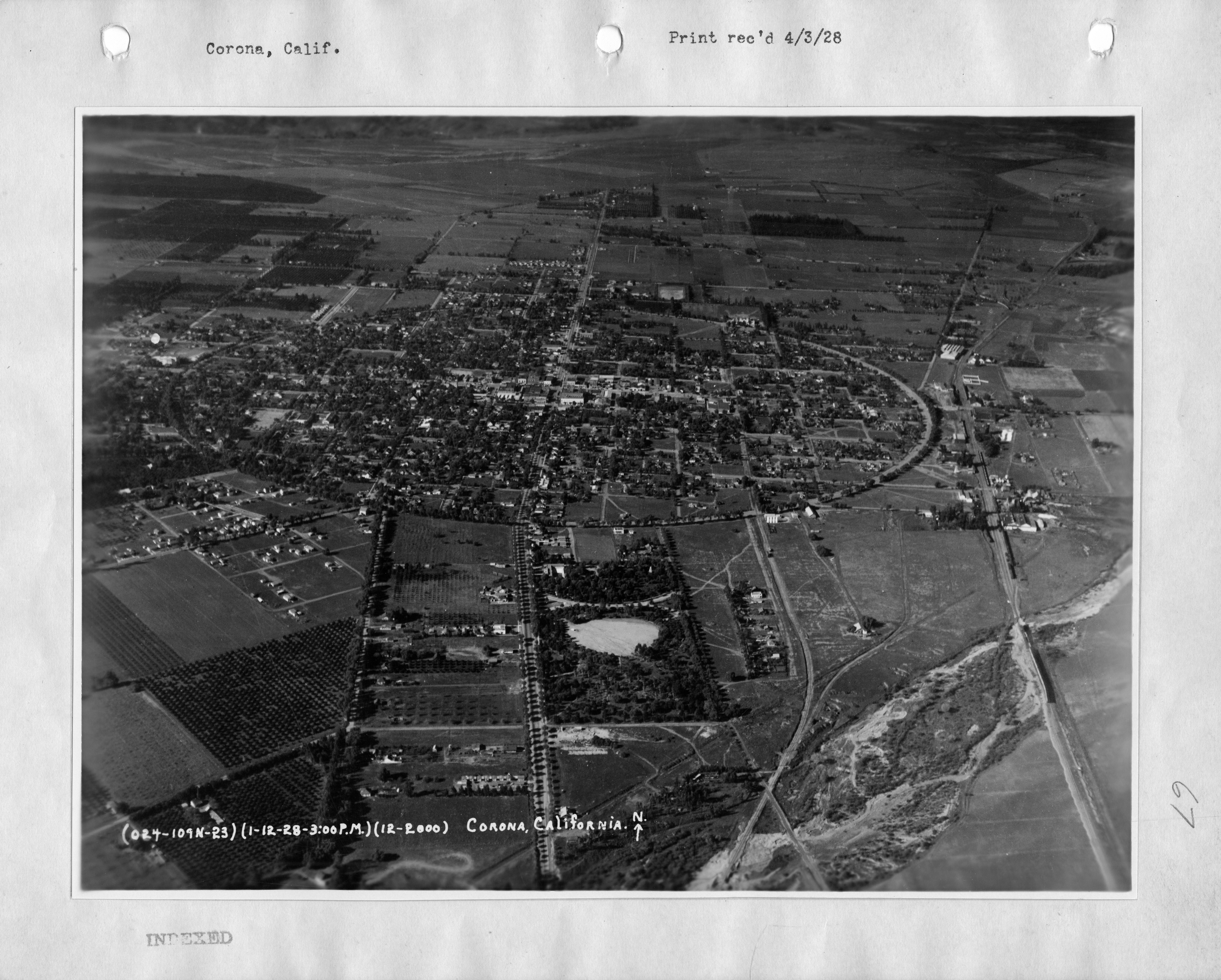
Historical photo of the circle of Corona, California in the 1940s with Temescal Creek in the foreground. The creek was adjacent to Paxauxa.

Paxauxa was the site of two villages located on either side of the Temescal Creek on the southern edge of Tovaangar and the northern edge of Payómkawichum territory, with Lake Elsinore to the south being within Payómkawichum homelands. This likely made it an important site for the Tongva and Payómkawichum socially and politically, since cooperation and marriage ties between the villagers were common.

After the establishment of Mission San Juan Capistrano in 1776, several of the villagers were brought to and baptized at the mission. It is unclear when the village was abandoned or destroyed.

== See also ==
- Kaawchama
- Puhú
- Wá’peat
- Yaanga
