= Ceegenga =

Tongva village

Ceegenga was a Tongva village that was one of the closest located to San Fernando Mission at the time of its establishment by the Spanish in the late eighteenth century, possibly in the Granada Hills area. Six baptisms from the village were recorded at the mission from 1797 to 1802.

A possible alternative spelling for the village may have been Sesebenga or Sasabenga. The village was closely situated to the Tongva village of Momonga near the Chumash nation.
