= Wapijanga =

Tongva village

Wapijanga was a Tongva village located in what is now Chino Hills, California, between the San Gabriel Mountains and Saddleback Peak. The village was located along Chino Creek, upstream from the village of Pashiinonga. It has been alternatively referred to as Wajijanga and Wapijangna. It was recorded as a large village in San Gabriel Mission records.

Wapijanga was a place of contact between Tongva and Serrano peoples, who primarily lived further east. It was closest situated to the Tongva villages of Pashiinonga (also in the Chino Hills area) and Tooypinga (along San Jose Creek near the grounds of the Los Angeles County Fair).

The village site was submerged by the construction of the Prado Dam in 1941.
