= Tooypinga =

Tongva village

Tooypinga, alternatively spelled Toibinga, was a Tongva village located between the San Gabriel Mountains and Saddleback Peak at the base of the San Jose Hills along San Jose Creek. Nearby villages included Pashiinonga and Wapijanga. According to José Zalvidea, an informant of the era, the name "is derived from tojtsh, the devil woman who is there at El Rincon, near San José." People from the village were recorded as Toibipet.

== History ==
During the establishment of nearby Mission San Gabriel, Spanish soldiers raped the wife of a local tomyaar or leader, which prompted an attack on the mission. The tomyaar was killed and decapitated by the soldiers. Soldiers conducted sweeps of the Los Angeles Basin area, in which children were abducted to the missions and women were raped. In these sweeps, the entire village of Tooypinga was razed in an attack by Spanish soldiers prior to 1785.

Refugees fled to other villages while many others were eventually baptized at Mission San Gabriel and Mission San Juan Capistrano. Marriage records also indicated that villagers were married from at least 1784 to 1824.

The destroyed village site would become part of the Rancho San José, which was established in 1837. This would eventually become at or near the grounds of the Los Angeles County Fair.
