= Val Verde, California =

Unincorporated community in Los Angeles County, California

- Unincorporated community
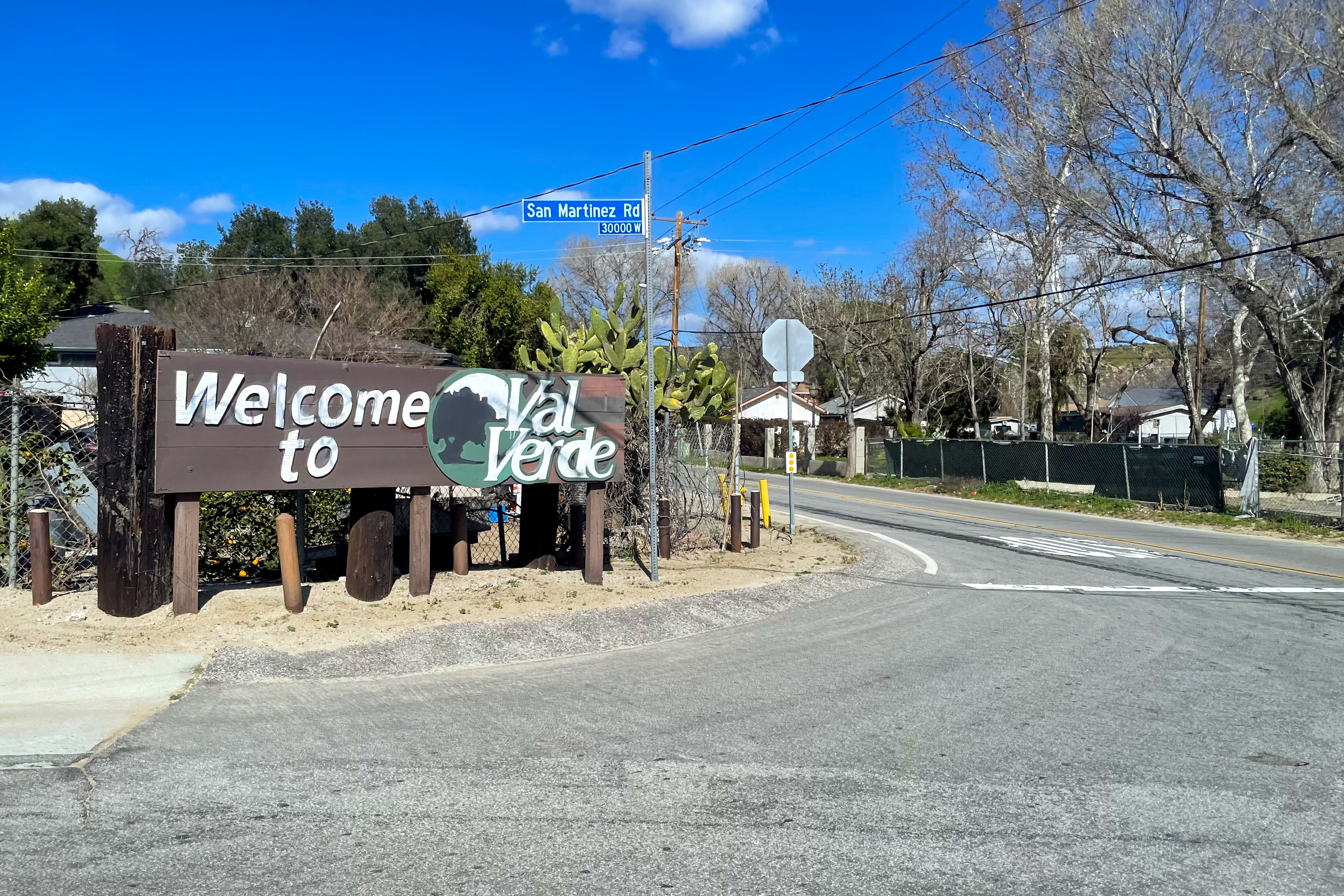
- Welcome sign at San Martinez Road and Chiquito Canyon Road

- Location of Val Verde in Los Angeles County, California.

- Location in the United States Val Verde (California) Val Verde (the United States)
- Coordinates: 34.445°N 118.658°W
- Country: United States
- State: California
- County: Los Angeles
- Settlement: 1920s

Area
  - Total: 2.565 sq mi (6.644 km^{2})
  - Land: 2.565 sq mi (6.644 km^{2})
  - Water: 0 sq mi (0 km^{2}) 0%
- Elevation: 1,188 ft (362 m)

Population (2020)
  - Total: 2,399
  - Density: 935.2/sq mi (361.1/km^{2})
- Time zone: UTC-8 (PST)
  - Summer (DST): UTC-7 (PDT)
- ZIP code: 91384
- Area code: 661
- FIPS code: 06-81967
- GNIS feature ID: 1661607

Val Verde (Spanish for "Green Valley") is an unincorporated community in the southeastern Topatopa Mountains foothills, and in northwestern Los Angeles County, California, United States. The unincorporated community of Valencia (Newhall Ranch) is to the southeast, and the city of Santa Clarita is east of the community. Its population was 2,399 at the 2020 census, down from 2,468 at the 2010 census. For statistical purposes the Census Bureau has defined Val Verde as a census-designated place (CDP).

== Geography ==
Val Verde is located in the San Martinez Chiquito Canyon in the southeastern foothills of the Topatopa Mountains at an elevation ranging from 1,250–1,400 feet (380–430 m). The canyon contains a creek that runs intermittently through the community. It is about 50 miles (80 km) northwest of the county seat in downtown Los Angeles and west of the community of Valencia and the city of Santa Clarita.

According to the United States Census Bureau, the CDP boundary has a total area of 1,641.81 acres (2.56533 sq mi; 6.6442 km^{2}), all land.

=== Vegetation ===
The area is a coastal sage scrub and chaparral habitat. The area is surrounded by mature trees, including native Coast Live Oaks and California Sycamores, as well as introduced trees that were planted in Val Verde Park like River She-Oak, Deodar Cedar, Silk Oak, and Ash.

== History ==
The area of modern-day Val Verde was part of the territory of the Tataviam people who had migrated to the region before the mid-5th century AD. One of the nearest settlements to the Val Verde area was called Chaguibit, located to the east of the confluence of the Santa Clara River and Castaic Creek.

=== Spanish and Mexican era ===
Spanish colonization of the region began in the late 1700s. With the establishment of the San Fernando Rey de España Mission in 1797, the native populations around this mission, named fernandeños by the Spanish, were relocated from their ancestral settlements, referred to as rancherías, to the mission where they were coerced into conversion and forced labor with the purpose of Christianization and assimilation. By 1810, nearly the entire Tataviam population had been displaced to the mission lands and baptized under the Spanish mission system. In 1804, the Santa Clarita Valley began to be used by the Spanish when the missionaries established the San Francisco Xavier Estancia near the Santa Clara and Castaic confluence to supplement agricultural and livestock production for the San Fernando Mission using native labor.

Following the independence of Mexico, the missions went through a process of secularization, and mission lands were inventoried and sold off by the government as ranchos; the lands were supposed to be returned to the natives who had belonged to the missions, but this principle was not followed. The former estancia lands were sold as Rancho San Francisco by California governor Juan Bautista Alvarado to his friend lieutenant Antonio del Valle on January 22, 1839. The northern boundaries of this rancho ran along the north bank of the Santa Clara River up to an area near the current intersection of Chiquito Canyon Road and Henry Mayo Drive and up along the mountains east of Val Verde.

In 1842 Francisco López, a relative of Del Valle, found gold in Placerita Canyon, leading to a small local gold rush in which Mexican settlers, many of them from Sonora, came to the rancho to mine gold. The original settlement of Val Verde was a short-lived boom town built by colonial Mexican settlers. During the Mexican–American War, Del Valle destroyed the mine to prevent the United States from gaining its control.

The rancho stayed in the Del Valle family through the occupation and annexation of Alta California by the United States until 1862 when economic strife caused by floods and droughts forced him to sell most of the land to speculators, eventually ending up in the hands of Henry Newhall.

=== Val Verde Ranch ===
By the early 1900s, the Janes family owned the 10,200-acre Val Verde Ranch (4,100 ha) where the modern settlement is located. Laura C. Janes, a wealthy white woman from Pasadena, opened her ranch to African Americans in the 1910s in response to the discrimination they faced, which excluded them from public recreational facilities and prevented them from owning and developing property in certain areas. Under these conditions of segregation and discrimination, a group of prominent members of the African American community in Los Angeles searched for locations to create a place of recreation for their families. The group was led by real estate entrepreneur Sidney Preston Dones and other investors like Norman O. Houston, Charlotta Bass, and Hattie S. Baldwin. The group ended up connecting with Laura C. Janes.

=== Eureka Villa and Val Verde ===
In 1924, the modern settlement was founded by Sidney P. Dones and his group of investors. It was named Eureka Villa. That settlement was designed as a resort community for African Americans, as in that period, African Americans were frequently barred from public beaches and swimming pools. The town became known as the "Black Palm Springs". By the 1930s, the area was wildly popular, mainly because it was one of only a few places blacks could go for recreation.

Other Southern California destinations included Lake Elsinore reservoir in Riverside County, a section of Venice Beach, Bruce's Beach in the South Bay, and a park in Pasadena only open to blacks one day a year.

Two land tracts were being sold; one was the Eureka Villa Tract and the other was the Val Verde Tract. Eureka Villa was the land running north–south along the east side of Chiquito Canyon Road while Val Verde covered the east–west area of land. Newspaper promotions focused on Black Angelenos and encouraged them to invest in these properties to build vacation homes. 50 by 80 feet (15 by 24 m) and larger sites were offered starting at $75, including the full deed and title and a paid lifetime membership to the community club. Eventually, Dones and his group along with Janes discontinued their management of sales for the Val Verde Tract, focusing only on Eureka Villa and Harry M. Waterman, another white landowner who was instrumental in the development and management of the lots, took charge of Val Verde.

In 1927, a 53-acre property (21 ha) was donated to the county by white landowners led by Harry M. Waterman which later became Val Verde Park. By this time, the area was known simply as Val Verde and Waterman continued to be an important developer of the community. Cafés, restaurants, and nightclubs were opened along with motels, lodges, and campgrounds. Entertainers like Ella Fitzgerald and Lena Horne made appearances in the town.

By 1939, prices for the lots ranged from $99 to $400 and more than fifty homes had been built. The park continued to be the site of gatherings. In 1939, the cornerstone for the Olympic swimming pool was laid in a ceremony attended by the community and thousands of others and presided over by actress Hattie McDaniel. The 1994 Northridge earthquake damaged the original pool. Advertising for the area continued in the 1940s. Leon Perdue began to serve as Val Verde Park's director in 1942, becoming the first African American to have this permanent position for the Los Angeles County Department of Parks and Recreation. Perdue worked with the Chamber of Commerce to orchestrate various programs including the Bathing Beauty Pageant, the Musclemen Shows, Fourth of July Dances, Christmas programs among others. In 1945 William S. Hart High School was built and students no longer had to travel 20 miles (32 km) to San Fernando High School. Elementary school-aged kids traveled to Castaic Elementary.

In the 1950s and 60s, the main employers in the community were Thatcher Glass in Saugus, Burmite Powder Company, and Kaiser Manufacturing. African Americans continued to compose the majority of the population in the 50s. A Baptist church opened in 1953 which is now the Castaic Community African Methodist Episcopal Church. In 1951, the Val Verde Improvement Association initiated a water and lighting district to improve the poor water supply system in the community.

The Val Verde Chamber of Commerce appointed Marguerite Carr as president in 1960 after James Barksdale resigned due to declining health. She had promoted the park's first Goodwill Relationship Day to bring together members of different racial groups in the area starting in 1952. She was instrumental in the establishment of a post office branch in the community in June 1956.

Despite the community having been built as a safe-haven for African Americans, residents still faced difficulties. In 1964, a home owned by Frank D. Godden, an African American World War II veteran and community developer, was burned down by members of the Klan who had a "nucleus" in the area at that time.

=== Post-1960s ===
With the advent of civil-rights reforms in the 1960s and the unenforceability of racial covenants, many African Americans moved out of the area for larger areas from which they were previously segregated. Farm workers from nearby agricultural areas began to move to the area. The town now has a large percentage of Latinos and Whites.

By the 1970s the population was nearing 500. In 1973, 126 new homes were built. In November 1971, the California Institute of the Arts established their Valencia campus and instructors and alumni moved to the area. In the 1980s, the total population had risen to between 600 and 1,000 people with 10% to 15% being white. The area began to decline as vacation homes that weren't intended to be permanent became dilapidated. In 1980, city officials reported that half of the houses were deemed sub-standard. Many of the dwellings were rented out.

In the early 1990s the Chiquita Canyon Landfill, which had been constructed near the community in 1971, faced resistance as its expansion was sought. As part of negotiations, the landfill provides the community with funds for scholarship programs.

The 1994 Northridge earthquake wreaked tremendous havoc on the town, damaging most of the original structures. The original pool was damaged and has since been repaired and shortened. The pool is part of the Los Angeles County Park system. It opens late spring until early fall. Day and evening swimming sessions occur daily.

In 2011, Verizon Wireless attempted to build a 30,000 watt, 12-panel antenna array cell site in Val Verde, less than 50 feet (15 m) from an adjacent residence. Verizon Wireless and its contractor claimed that the main reason for the cell site was for community of Val Verde, but inquiries were made and the cell site is designed to fill coverage holes in the adjacent Valencia Commerce Center industrial park, Hasley Hills housing tract, and for future developments outside of Val Verde. Local residents banded together and protested the cell site, claiming that big business was trying to run rampant over the little community of Val Verde. As of early 2013, Verizon Wireless has not built the cell tower, and has decided to build the tower on a hillside away from homes.

On May 16, 2017, the Los Angeles County Sheriff's Department seized 7,000 cockfighting birds at a ranch on Jackson Street in Val Verde. Although 2,700 birds had been seized from the same location in 2007, the 2017 raid was the "largest cockfighting bust in U.S. history" according to The Los Angeles Times, while the sheriff department said it was, "one of the largest seizures of flying fowl used for illegal cockfighting and (for) breeding for illegal cockfighting purposes." The owner was not arrested.

== Demographics ==
Historical population
Census	Pop.	Note	%±
1990	1,689		—
2000	1,472		−12.8%
2010	2,468		67.7%
2020	2,399		−2.8%
U.S. Decennial Census; 1860–1870 1880-1890; 1900 1910 1920; 1930 1940 1950; 1960 1970 1980; 1990 2000 2010; 2020

Val Verde first appeared as a census designated place in the 1990 U.S. census as part of the Newhall census county division.

=== Racial and ethnic composition ===
Val Verde CDP, California – Racial and ethnic composition Note: the US Census treats Hispanic/Latino as an ethnic category. This table excludes Latinos from the racial categories and assigns them to a separate category. Hispanics/Latinos may be of any race.
Race / Ethnicity (NH = Non-Hispanic)	Pop 2000	Pop 2010	Pop 2020	% 2000	% 2010	% 2020
White alone (NH)	592	737	627	40.22%	29.86%	26.14%
Black or African American alone (NH)	60	98	68	4.08%	3.97%	2.83%
Native American or Alaska Native alone (NH)	3	6	5	0.20%	0.24%	0.21%
Asian alone (NH)	24	44	62	1.63%	1.78%	2.58%
Native Hawaiian or Pacific Islander alone (NH)	2	0	2	0.14%	0.00%	0.08%
Other race alone (NH)	4	6	18	0.27%	0.24%	0.75%
Mixed race or Multiracial (NH)	27	70	68	1.83%	2.84%	2.83%
Hispanic or Latino (any race)	760	1,507	1,549	51.63%	61.06%	64.57%
Total	1,472	2,468	2,399	100.00%	100.00%	100.00%

=== 2020 census ===
As of the 2020 census, Val Verde had a total population of 2,399 and a population density of 935.1630213 inhabitants per square mile (361.0684611/km^{2}). The median age was 35.8 years.

23.3% of residents were under the age of 18 and 10.1% of residents were 65 years of age or older. For every 100 females there were 106.8 males, and for every 100 females age 18 and over there were 106.2 males age 18 and over. 82.3% of residents lived in urban areas, while 17.7% lived in rural areas.

The makeup of racial identification was: 819 (34.1%) White with 627 (26.1%) Non-Hispanic; 73 (3%) African American; 42 (1.8%) Native American; 70 (2.9%) Asian; 4 (0.2%) Pacific Islander. 892 (37.2%) identified as some other race and 499 (20.8%) identified with two or more races. 1,549 (64.6%) identified as Hispanic or Latino.

100% of the population lived in households, none lived in either institutionalized or non-institutionalized group quarters. The makeup of housing relationships was 723 (30.1%) householders; 358 (14.9%) opposite-sex spouses and 5 (0.2%) same-sex spouses; 44 (1.8%) opposite-sex unmarried partners and 2 (0.1%) same-sex unmarried partners; 805 (33.6%) children under 18; 109 (4.5) grandchildren; 234 (9.8) other relatives and 119 (5%) nonrelatives.

There were 689 households with the makeup of householders being: 401 (58.2%) married couples with 178 (25.8%) living with their own children (under 18 y/o); 38 (5.5%) cohabiting couples with 20 (2.9%) living with their own children (under 18 y/o); 130 (18.9%) single males, with 70 (3.3%) being 65 years and over and living alone, and 16 (2.3%) living with their own children (under 18 y/o); 120 (17.4%) single females, with 16 (2.3%) being 65 years and over and living alone, and 15 (2.2%) living with their own children (under 18 y/o). 262 (38%) households had individuals under 18 years old and 190 (27.6%) had individuals 65 years and over. About 16.4% of all households were made up of individuals and 5.6% had someone living alone who was 65 years of age or older.

There were 719 total housing units, 689 (95.8%) of which were occupied, leaving 30 (4.2%) vacant. Of the occupied housing units, 590 (85.6%) were occupied by homeowners and 99 (14.4%) were occupied by renters. The homeowner vacancy rate was 1.2% and the rental vacancy rate was 0.0%.

=== 2010 census ===
At the 2010 census Val Verde had a population of 2,468. The population density was 962.1 inhabitants per square mile (371.5/km^{2}). The racial makeup of Val Verde was 1,404 (56.9%) White (29.9% Non-Hispanic White), 105 (4.3%) African American, 26 (1.1%) Native American, 48 (1.9%) Asian, 1 (0.0%) Pacific Islander, 732 (29.7%) from other races, and 152 (6.2%) from two or more races. Hispanic or Latino of any race were 1,507 persons (61.1%).

The census reported that 2,466 people (99.9% of the population) lived in households, 2 (0.1%) lived in non-institutionalized group quarters, and no one was institutionalized.

Of the 671 households, 331 (49.3%) had children under 18 living in them, 404 (60.2%) were opposite-sex married couples living together, 87 (13.0%) had a female householder with no husband present, and 43 (6.4%) had a male householder with no wife present. There were 37 (5.5%) unmarried opposite-sex partnerships, and 1 (0.1%) same-sex married couples or partnerships. 90 households (13.4%) were one person and 22 (3.3%) had someone living alone who was 65 or older. The average household size was 3.68. There were 534 families (79.6% of households); the average family size was 4.00.

The age distribution was 706 people (28.6%) under 18, 288 people (11.7%) aged 18 to 24, 726 people (29.4%) aged 25 to 44, 624 people (25.3%) aged 45 to 64, and 124 people (5.0%) who were 65 or older. The median age was 31.7 years. For every 100 females, there were 102.1 males. For every 100 females age 18 and over, there were 106.1 males.

There were 715 housing units at an average density of 278.7 per square mile, of the occupied units 521 (77.6%) were owner-occupied and 150 (22.4%) were rented. The homeowner vacancy rate was 3.2%; the rental vacancy rate was 2.6%. 1,873 people (75.9% of the population) lived in owner-occupied housing units and 593 people (24.0%) lived in rental housing units.

According to the 2010 United States Census, Val Verde had a median household income of $58,971, with 18.6% of the population living below the federal poverty line.

=== 2000 census ===
At the 2000 census there were 1,472 people, 424 households, and 318 families in the CDP. The population density was 4,428.8 inhabitants per square mile (1,710.0/km^{2}). There were 444 housing units at an average density of 1,335.9 per square mile (515.8/km^{2}). The racial makeup of the CDP was 55.98% White, 4.28% African American, 0.68% Native American, 1.63% Asian, 0.20% Pacific Islander, 33.22% from other races, and 4.01% from two or more races. Hispanic or Latino of any race were 51.63%.

Of the 424 households, 50.2% had children under the age of 18 living with them, 58.3% were married couples living together, 9.7% had a female householder with no husband present, and 25.0% were not families. About 16.0% of households were one person, and 2.1% were one person aged 65 or older. The average household size was 3.47, and the average family size was 3.89.

The age distribution was 33.4% under the age of 18, 12.4% from 18 to 24, 36.0% from 25 to 44, 15.0% from 45 to 64, and 3.2% 65 or older. The median age was 27 years. For every 100 females, there were 105.3 males. For every 100 females age 18 and over, there were 107.2 males.

The median household income was $52,593 and the median family income was $53,843. Males had a median income of $30,583 versus $24,861 for females. The per capita income for the CDP was $15,626. About 3.6% of families and 6.4% of the population were below the poverty line, including none of those under age 18 and 37.1% of those age 65 or over.

== Economy ==
Val Verde has one convenience store in the community. There is also a rustic ranch with cottages for vacation rentals, a family farm which produces organic produce and the 250-acre SilverStrand movie ranch (100 ha).

== Government ==
In the California State Legislature, Val Verde is in the 23rd senatorial district, represented by Republican Suzette Martinez Valladares, and in the 40th Assembly district, represented by Democrat Pilar Schiavo.

In the United States House of Representatives, Val Verde is in California's 27th congressional district, represented by Democrat George T. Whitesides.

Val Verde has a civic association of volunteers, the Val Verde Civic Association (VVCA), which is the liaison between the LA County 5th District Supervisor, community leaders and the residents. The VVCA is a 501(c)(4) non-profit corporation and has an elected six-member board of directors with up to three appointed Associate Board Members. Monthly meetings are held on the second Thursday of every month at 7 pm in the community clubhouse. Guest speakers give presentations to the community regarding issues from fire safety, CERT, Department of Public Works, Deputies from the Supervisor's office and the Sheriff's office, CHP updates and the Waterworks District. Residents have the opportunity to learn about the community and to voice their opinions.

Chiquita Canyon Landfill provided its 2015 annual grant of over $350,000 to the Val Verde Community Benefits Funding Committee (CBFC) as part of its 1997 Agreement with Val Verde. The Val Verde community has received funds from Chiquita for over 15 years. The CBFC provides funding from the landfill to support after-school programs, tutoring, scholarships, bus passes, groceries for needy families, youth sports programs, etc. all for Val Verde residents.

Val Verde has two seats on the Castaic Area Town Council (CATC). The CATC is the liaison between the LA County 5th District Supervisor, community leaders and the residents of the 5 areas of Castaic. The CATC holds a meeting every third Wednesday of the month at 6:30 pm at the Castaic School District Office. Residents are invited to attend the meeting, as local officials make presentations to the Board and the audience.

=== Religion ===
As of 2021, there are two churches in the community, the Castaic Community African Methodist Episcopal Church and the Macedonia Church of God in Christ.

== Infrastructure ==
Vehicular access to the community from two points in the north and south on paved two-lane roads. The Chiquito Canyon Road branches off from State Route 126, here named Henry Mayo Drive, and enters the community from the south; from the north, Del Valle Road branches off from Hasley Canyon Road to enter the community. Other than these public roads, there are dirt mountain roads that give emergency access to the surrounding mountains. The majority of public residential roads are paved; there are no paved sidewalks in the semi-rural community. The main east–west thoroughfare is San Martinez Road.

The City of Santa Clarita Transit service operates route 2 which runs through from the McBean Regional Transit Center in Santa Clarita, with four stops on Chiquito Canyon Road, three on San Martinez Road including one in Val Verde Park, and one on Del Valle Road.

Home construction ranges from wood-frame with stucco facades to large multi-bedroom houses.

Residents use septic tanks for their sewage, discouraging development.

== Education ==
Val Verde is served by the Castaic Union School District (elementary school) and the William S. Hart Union High School District.

== See also ==
- Del Valle, California
