= Del Valle, California =

Placename in Los Angeles County, California

Del Valle is a placename in the Castaic area of Los Angeles County, California, United States. The Del Valle Oil Field (discovered 1940) and L.A. County Fire Department's Del Valle Regional Training Center are located nearby.

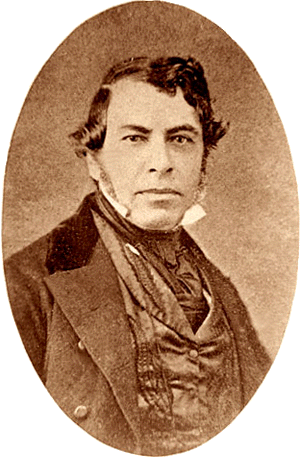
Don Ygnacio del Valle

The community is named after Don Ygnacio del Valle, a wealthy Californio ranchero and politician, whose Rancho San Francisco encompassed the site of the community.

== See also ==
- Valencia, California
- Val Verde, California
