= Honmoyausha, California =

Former Chumashan settlement in California

Honmoyausha is a former Chumashan settlement in Los Angeles County, California.

It was located at El Barranco near San Pedro Bay - modern-day San Pedro.
