= Wahoo, California =

Wahoo
- Former settlement
- Location in California
- Coordinates: 34°14′29″N 118°23′41″W
- Country: United States
- State: California
- County: Los Angeles County
- Elevation: 912 ft (278 m)

Wahoo is a former settlement in Los Angeles County, California. Wahoo was at an elevation of 912 feet (278 m). Wahoo still appeared on USGS maps as of 1942.
