= Los Angeles County Fair =

Annual county fair in Pomona, California, USA

- The 2008 L.A. County Fair at dusk in Pomona
- Genre: County fair
- Dates: 06–31 May 2027 (16 days, closed Mondays, Tuesdays & Wednesdays except Memorial Day)
- Location: Pomona, California
- Coordinates: 34°05′00″N 117°45′45″W
- Years active: 1922–1941, 1948–2019, 2022– (no fair during WWII from 1942–47, nor 2020–21 due to the COVID-19 pandemic)
- Attendance: 787,843 (2024)
- Website: LACF

The Los Angeles County Fair is an annual county fair. It was first held on October 17, 1922, and ran for five days through October 21, 1922, in a former beet field in Pomona, California. Highlights of the fair's first year were harness racing, chariot races and an airplane wing-walking exhibition. The fair is one of the largest county fairs in the United States. Attendance has topped one million people every year with the exception of three years since 1948, and is the 4th largest fair in the United States. Since its opening year, over 89,000,000 visitors have attended the LA County Fair.

Since its inception, the fair has been the link between California’s agriculture industry and the public, providing a community gathering place where people learn about California’s heritage and enjoy traditional fair food, activities and entertainment. In recent years, the fair has moved away from such agricultural heritage by transitioning from livestock competitions for area growers and ranchers to hired petting zoos. In addition to the 13-acre (53,000 m^{2}) Ray Cammack Shows carnival, the fair has an operational farm, an outdoor miniature garden railroad, California’s Heritage Square historical exhibit and America’s Kids-Education Expo. They also have the Flower and Garden Pavilion, a grandstand for shows and several large Expo Halls.

The May Concert Series features multiple nights of musical entertainment, including many well-known acts. When the Fair was held in September, there was the "End of Summer Concert Series" which also included motocross and monster truck performances.

The fair is operated by the Los Angeles County Fair Association, a non-profit 501(c)(5) corporation. The fair has been regularly held during the end-of-summer months from its inception in 1922 through the 2000s, except for all fairs since 2022, held in May. The fair is built on 543 acres (2.20 km^{2}) of fairgrounds known as Fairplex (Los Angeles County Fair, hotel and exposition complex). This also generates a national economic impact of more than $250 million.

The Los Angeles County Fair's mascot "Thummer" was introduced in 1948 as "Porky the Hitchhiking Pig". The artist - Morrie Stewart - originally designed the pig mascot for Kaiser Steel before being approached by the fair to create a new mascot with the re-opening of the fair following World War II. "Porky the Hitchhiking Pig" appeared at the Los Angeles County Fair through 1952 when another cartoon claimed naming rights to the name. The fair held a naming contest through radio and television, and the name "Thummer" was adopted. Thummer has been a regular appearance at the Los Angeles County Fair ever since. Thummer wore his trademark outfit and carried a briefcase through the 1980s when a "Mrs. Thummer" was introduced. Thummer disappeared in the early 1980s, but reappeared in 1988.

Fairplex also includes the Sheraton Fairplex Hotel & Conference Center, the Sheraton KOA/RV Park, Barretts Sales and Racing, a defunct 0.625 mi (1.006 km) horse racing track, the Millard Sheets Art Center, the Child Development Center at Fairplex, the Fairplex railway exhibit, Barretts Equine Ltd., a thoroughbred horse racing auction facility and the Wally Parks NHRA Motorsports Museum.

The Los Angeles County Fair was canceled shortly after the 1941 fair due to the outbreak of World War II and re-opened in 1948. The 2020-21 fairs were canceled due to the COVID-19 pandemic in California, deferring, as announced in May 2021, the next fair to May 2022, citing that summer heat resulted in reduced attendance.

Patrollers include security guards, the Pomona Police and Los Angeles County Sheriff's Office.

== History ==
- The Tongva village site of Tooypinga was located at or near the grounds of the fair.
- These grounds were once used as the Wartime Civilian Control Administration Pomona Assembly Center during World War II. Japanese Americans were held here before being sent to internment camps. A historical marker was placed at the site in 2016. It was occupied from May 7 to August 24, 1942, and held more than 5,000 people. There are few, if any, buildings left from the original assembly center.
- The first L.A. County Fair was held in 1922, at the Los Angeles Fairgrounds in Pomona. The grounds, now known as Fairplex (short for L.A. County Fair, Hotel and Exposition Complex), now host hundreds of other events and activities throughout the year. The Wally Parks NHRA Motorsports Museum is located on the grounds, as well as the Sheraton Fairplex Hotel & Conference Center, the RailGiants Train Museum, and the Auto Club Raceway at Pomona.
- Besides 1942, it was also cancelled from 1943 to 1947 and again from 2020 to 2021, returning in 2022 for its 100th anniversary.

== Fair events ==
The Los Angeles County Fair offers visitors a number of rides as well as a variety of food and drinks available. Community days feature community heroes (senior, adult and youth), elected officials and high school marching bands from cities within 15 miles of Fairplex. The May concert series feature singers, bands and entertainers perform during the evening. Until 2013, there was horse racing during the Los Angeles County Fair meet at the Fairplex Park. From 2014 to 2021, all races during the Los Angeles County Fair meet had been held at the Los Alamitos Race Course for two weeks (8 race days, Thursday–Sunday). Thereafter, those races are at Santa Anita Park. In early June, a theme for the fair is chosen by the Los Angeles County Fair Association for the upcoming year.

== In popular culture ==
The county fair is played as a carnival in the HBO series Euphoria, however, the carnival is built outside the county fair.

== See also ==
- Orange County Fair (California)
