= Toybipet, California =

Toybipet (also, Sibapot and Toibi) is a former Gabrieleño settlement in Los Angeles County, California. It was located at San Jose (Pomona).
