= Sisitcanogna, California =

Sisitcanogna
- Former Tongva-Gabrieleño settlement
- Interactive map of Sisitcanogna
- Coordinates: 44.01473°N 91.47391°W
- Country: United States
- State: California
- County: Los Angeles
- Region: San Gabriel Valley
- Historical period: Pre-colonial era

Sisitcanogna is a former Tongva-Gabrieleño Native American settlement in Los Angeles County, California.

It was located at 'Pear Orchard' in the San Gabriel Valley, possibly in the northeast Pasadena area.

== See also ==
- Hahamongna, California
- Category: Tongva populated places
- Tongva language
- Population of Native California
