= Takuyumam, California =

Former Chumashan settlement in California, United States

Takuyumam
- Former settlement
- Location in California
- Coordinates: 34°23′05″N 118°31′51″W
- Country: United States
- State: California
- County: Los Angeles County
- Elevation: 1,257 ft (383 m)

Takuyumam is a former Chumashan settlement in Los Angeles County, California, United States. Its former location is now the site of Newhall.
