= Valencia, California =

Community in Los Angeles County, California, United States

- Unincorporated community
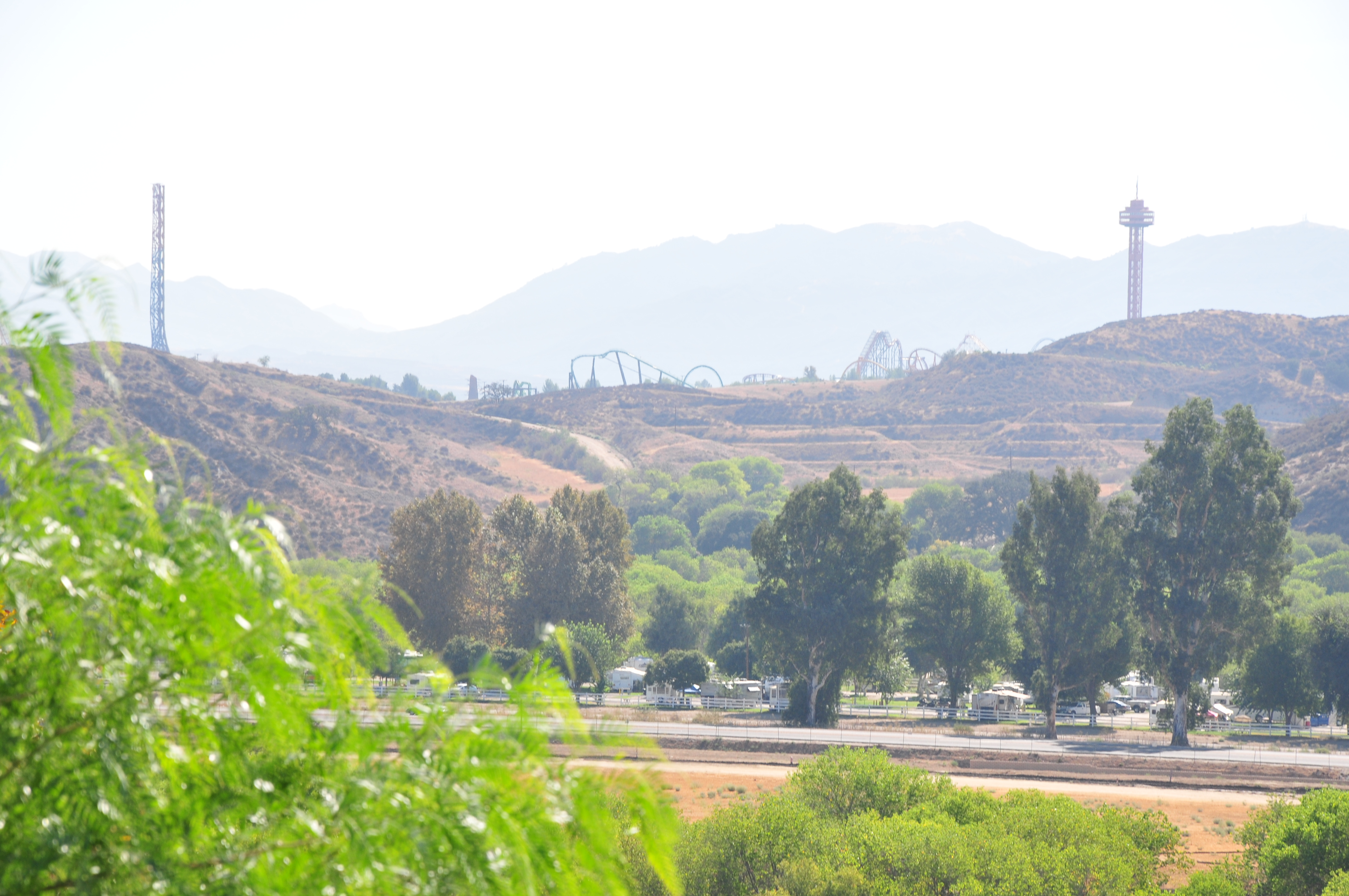
- Valencia with Magic Mountain theme park in background

- Location within Santa Clarita Location within the Los Angeles metropolitan area Location within California
- Coordinates: 34.42°N 118.60°W
- Country: United States
- State: California
- County: Los Angeles
- Named for: The Valencia orange
- ZIP Codes: 91355, 91381
- Area code: 661

Valencia is an unincorporated community in northwestern Los Angeles County, California, United States. The area, west of Interstate 5, is expanding with residential development and already includes major commercial and industrial parks. It straddles State Route 126 and the Santa Clara River.

A major expansion of Valencia is under construction with new residential neighborhoods and the expansion of commerce and industrial developments. Spanning the Santa Clara River, the massive Great Park development (formerly Newhall Ranch and FivePoint-Valencia) was conceived by the Newhall Land land management company in the 1980s. After lengthy delays due to environmental challenges and change of investors, the project broke ground in 2017. The new development is directly west of Six Flags Magic Mountain which is also in the unincorporated community.

== History ==
The area is a traditional land of Native Americans. The Tataviam people migrated there in A.D. 450 when the Chumash people were living there.

=== Newhall Ranch ===
Newhall Ranch was ranched and farmed until the 1960s when Newhall Land and Farming Company started a community named after a crop that was grown there, the Valencia orange. The completion of Interstate 5 through the Santa Clarita Valley in 1967 provided an improved route south into the San Fernando Valley. The same year, Newhall Land finished construction of the first homes in Valencia. With stores, parks, hospitals and schools, the community was intended to be self-contained. Construction began in November 1969 on the Magic Mountain amusement park which opened on May 29, 1971, as a development of the Newhall Land and Farming Company and Sea World Inc.

In the late 1980s, Newhall Land had one of the last big parcels of undeveloped real estate near Los Angeles with the 37,250-acre (15,070 ha) Newhall Ranch. They estimated that ten thousand acres (4,000 ha) was developable and about 3,500 acres (1,400 ha) of the master planned Valencia neighborhood had already been built out with 8,000 single-family houses, apartments, and condominiums. Nearly all of the homes were built by the Newhall Land company and they had approvals for some 3,000 additional homes. The area slated for industrial parks, that already had 300 companies and their 8,500 employees, was expanding. Much of the land for industrial and commercial development was sold to other companies to be developed. The large master-planned Great Park development (formerly Newhall Ranch and FivePoint-Valencia) in unincorporated Valencia was conceived by Newhall Land as a greenfield development not included in the original Valencia master plan.

When it incorporated in 1987, the city of Santa Clarita combined four communities, including most of the built out portion of Valencia east of Interstate-5, to form a city of 25,000. Although this was the only city, the population of the entire Santa Clarita Valley had reached 125,000. City council members of the city of Santa Clarita objected to the Newhall Ranch project in 1989. They were concerned with the congestion it could bring along with the environmental issues that had been raised by other groups. The city was also asking for this area to be included in their sphere of influence, just two years after the city incorporated. The sphere of influence is a municipal growth boundary that delineates the area that the Local Agency Formation Commission (LAFCO) believes is the appropriate and probable future city limit. The formation committee's proposal for the city included a much larger area than was finally allowed to proceed by LAFCO.

=== Expansion west of Interstate 5 ===
The 1990 LA County General Plan Update identified the unincorporated area of Newhall Ranch for urban development. They filed an application with the county to develop the area in 1994. The Northridge Earthquake fractured an ARCO pipeline just east of Interstate 5 in 1994.

Newhall Land started construction on the Valencia Marketplace in 1995 which became a major commercial center and a major source of sales tax revenue for unincorporated Valencia. By 1996, Newhall Land had developed 5,000 acres (2,000 ha) in Valencia with some 12,000 homes. In 1998, Valencia area had 1.1 million square feet of industrial space under construction with a 2% vacancy rate in the existing developments. The unincorporated area northwest of the intersection of Interstate 5 and State Route 126 had plenty of acreage and entitlements to accommodate additional industrial space. Valencia Commerce Center and IAC Commerce Center are master-planned business parks with mixed-use with office, industrial and retail. Centered on Commerce Center Drive, major tenants include Remo, Pharmavite, Mechanix Wear, and ITT Aerospace Controls.

While concerns were raised over the proposed Westridge golf course community in 1992 over the removal of oak trees for road construction, Newhall Land began construction in 1998 on the Westridge community located north of Stevenson Ranch. This adjacent community had been developed by Dale Poe Development Corp. in the previous decade after Newhall Land sold them the property. Located west of Interstate 5, the TPC Valencia golf course in Westridge was renamed The Oaks Club at Valencia in 2018.

The city of Santa Clarita applied to LAFCO for large increases to its sphere of influence in 1991. While the sphere of influence was increased and annexations approved on the other three sides of the city, the western boundary remained at Interstate 5. Newhall Land supported this limit, stating, "We've always seen the 5 freeway as the dividing line between the city and the county. … There are no city services in that area and it's isolated from the rest of the city."

The city applied to LAFCO for increases to its sphere of influence again in 2000. At the request of area town councils, the county board of supervisors put three advisory measures on the ballot in 2009. The residents of the unincorporated communities of Sunset Pointe, Stevenson Ranch, Southern Oaks, Westridge, Tesoro, Castaic and Val Verde were able to weigh in their preference. Most voted to stay unincorporated while some voted to be annexed to the city of Santa Clarita. Few were interested in creating their own city.

In 2009, Lennar acquired a 15% stake in the Newhall Land for $138 million, with five lenders owning the balance. Lennar formed Five Point Holdings LLC to manage its California master-plan developments in 2009.

=== Legal challenges to expansion ===
The developers of the Newhall Ranch project had hoped to break ground by 2012 but several lawsuits were filed over the years by various environmental groups, and other interested parties. During the decades the development had been in planning, it faced legal actions, environmental concerns, and several changes in investors. The landmark California Environmental Quality Act, or CEQA, was used to challenge the development even after the county had approved the specific plan and the zoning changes needed for the project. The downstream impact and other effects also drew Ventura County officials and citizens into opposition to the project. While these lawsuits have been dismissed as merely tactics to block or delay the project by some, others claim the environmental law has led to a better-designed project while saving crucial habitat.

The project straddles the Santa Clara River, one of the most dynamic river systems in southern California, with the planned area overlapping one of Los Angeles County's Strategic Ecological Areas program, which designates areas of "irreplaceable biological resources". The construction will fill in and alter more than 82 acres (33 ha) of the river's flood plain and tributaries according to the required permits. The area provides habitat for a wide array of native plants and animals including threatened and endangered fauna and flora.

The development includes building 21,500 dwelling units, a commercial district, seven public schools, three fire stations, a regional park, three community parks, a golf course, and a 15-acre (6.1 ha) lake divided into 9 areas referred to as villages. Ten thousand acres (4,000 ha) of permanent open space would be set aside and 50 miles (80 km) of trails developed. The plan includes converting nearly 20 miles (32 km) of tributaries and riverbank into storm drains and levees and use 20,000,000 cubic yards (15,000,000 m^{3}) of excavated soil to fill in wetlands.

The Newhall Ranch Sanitation District will operate a water reclamation plant serving the development near the boundary with Ventura County. The plant will treat an estimated 6,800,000 US gallons (26,000,000 L; 5,700,000 imp gal) of water every day before releasing it into the Santa Clara River as it flows towards the ocean and into Ventura County.

A lawsuit by three environmental groups was settled in 2004. In 2014, the California 2nd District Court of Appeal overturned a Los Angeles County Superior Court ruling and found that the environmental impact report adequately analyzed the project's potential impact on endangered fauna and flora and Native American cultural artifacts. The ruling also supported the agency's determination that storm-drain runoff from the project's 2,587 acres (1,047 ha) into the Santa Clara River would not harm juvenile steelhead trout downstream in Ventura County. Subsequently, the California Supreme Court agreed to review a petition that stated the appellate court opinion exempting developers from protections for the unarmored threespine stickleback would apply to other protected species such as the California Condor. Also of concern is that participation in land-use issues is discouraged by requiring that public comments be submitted early in the environmental review process rather than up to the time of project approval.

The environmental review for the Mission Village neighborhood was upheld by a Los Angeles Superior Court in May 2014. In April 2015, the Appellate court affirmed the environmental review for the Landmark Village neighborhood and approved the commence of the neighborhood's construction. Environmental groups that are still against the project continued challenges in court over Landmark Village.

The California Supreme Court ruled in November 2015 that Newhall Land Development Inc. failed to provide evidence in its overall Environmental Impact Report (EIR) to prove its project was consistent with state guidelines to control greenhouse gases. In May 2016 the state Supreme Court directed lower courts to toss out the EIRs mentioned above for two phases of construction. After changes had been made addressing the Supreme Court's concerns, the California Department of Fish and Wildlife certified the environmental impact report in 2017. In July 2017, the Los Angeles County Board of Supervisors certified a revised environmental analysis and re-approved land-use permits for the Mission Village and Landmark Village communities.

=== Major construction begins ===
The development broke ground in 2017, and the company FivePoint developed the first village, Mission Village. Landmark Village was planned to be the first neighborhood to be built. Mission Village, with 4,000 homes, has a "downtown style" mixed-use center. Homestead Village and Portero Village are also being planned. As of June 30, 2022, all 18 initial neighborhoods are under construction with a total of 725 homes sold since sales began in May 2021.

=== Entrada South and Entrada North ===
Entrada South and Entrada North are being developed by Newhall Land as part of their original Valencia Master Plan. The two Entrada projects are west of The Old Road and will abut the Great Park development on the east with roads connecting to Mission Village.

Entrada South includes 1,574 residential units including 339 homes and 1,235 multi-family units. At just over 500 acres (200 ha), the project also includes 730,000 square feet (68,000 m^{2}) of commercial development, a Saugus Union School District elementary school, and open space areas. The Newhall Ranch Resource Management and Development Plan and Spineflower Conservation Plan includes approval of a reserve within Entrada South. The development is between Six Flags Magic Mountain amusement park to the north and the community of Westridge to the south which is the most southerly community in unincorporated Valencia in 1998.

Entrada North is a development with 1,150 multi-family residential units built around a town center with shopping, dining and entertainment. The 479.3-acre (194.0 ha) project is southwest of the junction of Interstate 5 and Highway 126.

== Geography ==
Located in the westerly portion of the Santa Clarita Valley, the community straddles the Santa Clara River, considered the last undeveloped river valley in Southern California.. It is bounded on the west by the Ventura County line and on the east by Interstate 5, which also marks the border with the neighborhood of Valencia in the city of Santa Clarita. It is also bordered by Castaic to the north, Val Verde to the northwest, and Stevenson Ranch to the south.

Valencia has historically supplied people with water, fish, and fertile farmland. The area provides habitat for a wide array of native plants and animals including threatened and endangered fauna and flora such as the California condor, the California gnatcatcher, the southwestern willow flycatcher, the least Bell's vireo, the arroyo toad, the San Fernando Valley spineflower, and the threespine stickleback.

== Education ==
Elementary school students in Valencia attend schools in the Saugus Union School District and Newhall School District. Junior high and high school students attend Rancho Pico Junior High School and West Ranch High School, both part of the William S. Hart Union High School District.

College of the Canyons and California Institute of the Arts are located nearby, in the Santa Clarita city neighborhood of Valencia.

== Government ==
The entire Santa Clarita Valley, including Valencia, is in the Fifth District of the Los Angeles County Board of Supervisors, represented by Kathryn Barger.

=== State and federal representation ===
In the California State Senate, Valencia is in the 23rd district, represented by Suzette Martinez Valladares (R). In the State Assembly, it is in the 40th district, represented by Pilar Schiavo (D).

In the United States House of Representatives, Valencia and the entire Santa Clarita Valley is in California's 27th congressional district, represented by George T. Whitesides (D).

=== Law enforcement ===
The California Highway Patrol is responsible for patrolling public streets. The Los Angeles County Sheriff's Department serves the unincorporated Santa Clarita Valley communities together with the city of Santa Clarita which contracts for law enforcement.

== Notable people ==
- Brennan Bernardino (born 1992), MLB pitcher
- Jake Bird (born 1995), MLB pitcher
- Aaron Bummer (born 1993), MLB pitcher
- Keston Hiura (born 1996), MLB infielder
- Naya Rivera (1987–2020), actress
- Pat Valaika (b. 1992), MLB infielder
- Colton Herta (b. 2000), F2 Driver

== See also ==
- Centennial, California, a similar proposed 12,323-acre (49.87 km^{2}) master-planned community on Tejon Ranch
- Del Valle, California
- Rancho San Francisco
- U.S. HealthWorks (1995)
