= Seobit, California =

Former Native American settlement in California

Seobit is a former Tongva-Gabrieleño Native American settlement in Los Angeles County, California. It was located along the San Gabriel River, likely near present-day Norwalk, California.

The records of the San Gabriel Mission indicate that 35 people (6 men, 13 women, and 16 children) were baptized at the Seobit ranchería between 1779 and 1813. The majority of the inhabitants were probably not baptized, although many will have worked for ranchers.
