= Malibu Mar Vista, California =

Malibu Mar Vista
- Former settlement
- Location in California
- Coordinates: 34°03′42″N 118°45′54″W
- Country: United States
- State: California
- County: Los Angeles County
- Region: Santa Monica Mountains
- Elevation: 1,831 ft (558 m)

Malibu Mar Vista is a former settlement in the Malibu area of western Los Angeles County, California.

It lay at an elevation of 1831 feet (558 m) in the Santa Monica Mountains.

Malibu Mar Vista still appeared on USGS maps as of 1932.
