= 99 Oaks, California =

Unincorporated community in California, United States

Coordinates: 34°28′33″N 118°37′00″W

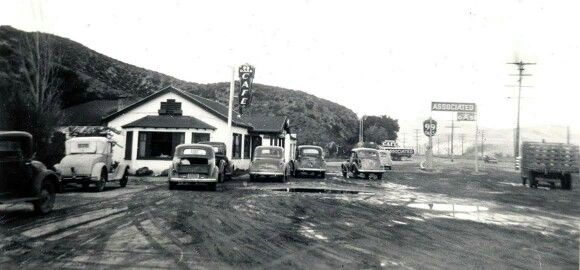
99 Oaks Café near Castaic, California, probably late 1930s or early 1940s

99 Oaks is an archaic placename of the Santa Clarita Valley, Los Angeles County, California, United States. The location mainly served as a rest stop between Castaic and Castaic Junction in what was then a fairly remote location along Old Highway 99. Otis and Macy Andrews opened the 99 Oaks Café in 1936. Circa 1950, 99 Oaks had a service station and a café. The name 99 Oaks was later used for buildings nearby, such as 99 Oaks Auto Court in Mint Canyon, 99 Oaks Cabins in Castaic, and the 99 Oaks Car Lot in Newhall. What little there was of 99 Oaks "mostly disappeared" when Route 99 was replaced by Interstate 5 in 1968.
