= Momonga (village) =

Former Tongva village in Los Angeles, US

Momonga was a Tongva village located at what is now Chatsworth, Los Angeles, California in the San Fernando Valley. The village may have been located in the area now referred to as Stoney Point. The village was located near the village of Ashaawanga (alternatively spelled Asha'awanga), also associated with the Chatsworth area.

== History ==
The village prospered in the valley lowlands for at least four thousand years. Momonga was connected to the neighboring settlement of Achooykomenga via a pre-Columbian trail that was later utilized by the Spanish to connect its series of missions.

With the arrival of the Spanish missionaries and settlers in 1769, the villagers came under the cultural and military influence of the nearby San Fernando Mission. This initiated the decline of the village.

The village may have been destroyed or abandoned by the 1790s.

== Memorialization ==
In 2019, the "Apeta Momonga Mission Trail" was approved as a historic-cultural monument by the Los Angeles City Council. The name included a reference to Momonga after input from the Tongva.
