= Okowvinjha =

Okowvinjha is a former Tongva (Fernandeño) Native American settlement in Los Angeles County, California. It was located near the Mission San Fernando Rey de España in the San Fernando Valley.

One source by Frederick Webb Hodge suggested that it may have been "identical" with Cahuenga. However, Hubert Howe Bancroft identified Okowvinjha, Kowanga (Cahuenga), and Saway-yanga each as different clans in the San Fernando area. He further identified the mission itself as the site of another clan referred to as Pasheeknga, that was likely assimilated quickly after the mission's founding in 1797.

== See also ==
- Awigna
- Yaanga
- Category: Tongva populated places
  - Tongva language
- California mission clash of cultures
- Ranchos in California
