= Tomol =

Chumash and Tongva plank boat

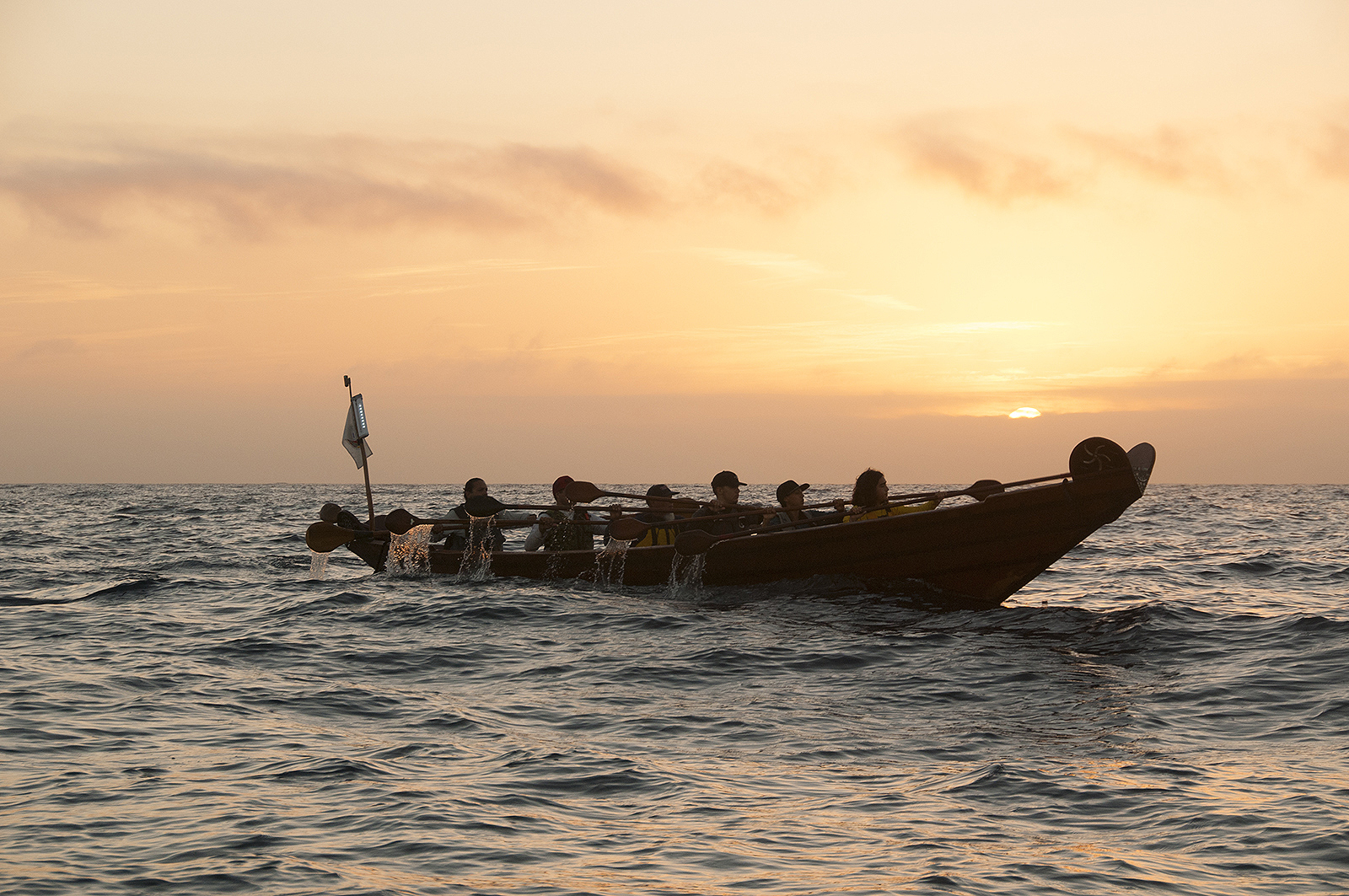
A tomol out at sea pictured in 2015. Each year, the Chumash community crosses from Channel Islands Harbor to Limuw (Santa Cruz Island) in a 17.2-mile journey (27.7 km).

A tomol or tomolo (Chumash) or te'aat or ti'at (Tongva/Kizh) are plank-built boats, historically and currently in the Santa Barbara, California and Los Angeles area. They replaced or supplemented tule reed boats. The boats were between 10–30 feet (3.0–9.1 m) in length and 3–4 feet (0.91–1.22 m) in width. The Chumash refer to the tomol as the "House of the Sea" for their reliability. Double-bladed kayak-like paddles are used to propel the boat through the ocean. Some sources suggest the boats may have origins at Catalina Island and have been in use for thousands of years. Others suggest an origin on the Northern Channel Islands during the first millennium CE. The tomol has been described as "the single most technologically complex watercraft built in North America" and as being unique to "the New World."

The boats are still constructed by Chumash, Tongva/Kizh, and Acjachemen people today.

== Construction ==
Tomols were preferably built out of redwood that had drifted down the coast. When supplies of redwood were lacking, local native pine was used. When splitting the wood with whalebone or antler wedges the crafters would seek straight planks without knotholes, then sand them with sharkskin. To bind the wood together, small holes were drilled in the planks so they could be lashed to one another. Finally, the seams were caulked with 'yop', a mixture of hard tar and pine pitch melted and then boiled. A crossplank at midship reinforced the boat and functioned as a seat. Another coat of 'yop' was used to waterproof the boat, followed by a coat of red ochre paint, followed by a final coat of sealant. Shell mosaics were often added as decorations.

This style of boat is unique in the Americas, though researcher Yorem Meroz notes that a simpler plank boat is found in Chile and strakes were sewn onto dugout boat bases in the Pacific Northwest and Caribbean. The boats could take up to 500 days to be constructed by an experienced boatmaker. Tomols are propelled with kayak-like paddles with the user in a crouching position, unlike kayaks where sitting is the norm. They are highly maneuverable.

=== Significance ===
Eva Pagaling (Santa Ynez Chumash) described the process of paddling in 2018: "During the crossing, a deep memory that’s shared among paddlers is that each pull of the oar is a prayer. And this year, I prayed for my loved ones, as well as everyone else in this world. I prayed for strength and healing for all people, wherever they may be on their path in life. Historically, we are water people and our medicine for the world can be found in the sacred and life-sustaining power of water."

Cindi Alvitre, co-founder of Ti'at Society, described the boat in 2019 as "a vessel that allows humans to connect to the underworld." According to an Indigenous worldview, as Alvitre describes: "You have the underworld, which is watery existence, those deities that live underneath the ocean in their caves, the middle world, that's the existence of human beings, to the upper world, that's ancestral space. The ti'at is like an observation point, it's like you're hovering over the heavens of the underworld and being able to still have that connection to that ancestral space, to the stars, to the Milky Way."

== History ==
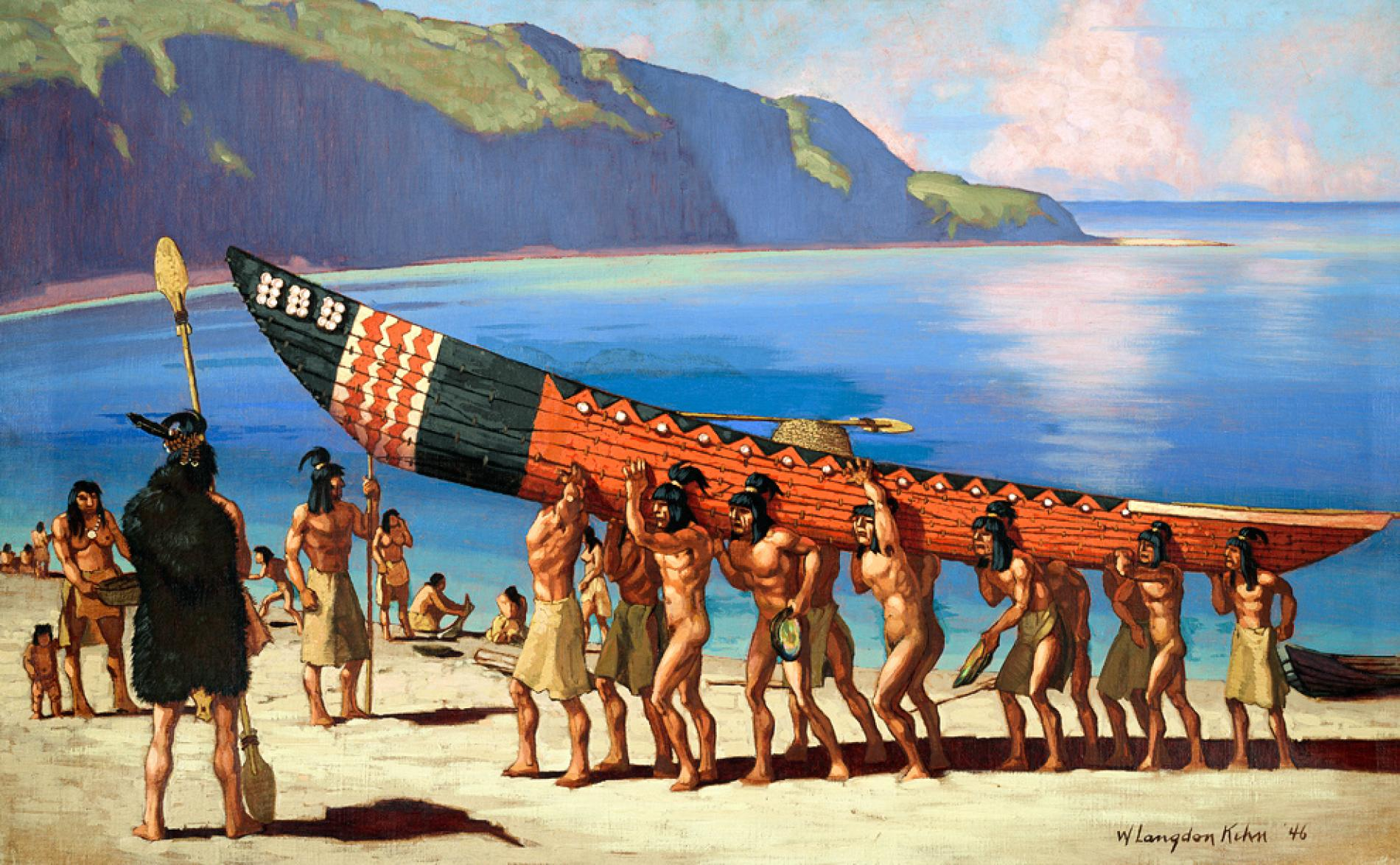
Artist rendition of a historical Chumash tomol.

Tomols were an integral part of a widespread trading network between tribes who lived at what is now referred to as Point Conception, Santa Monica Bay, and the Channel Islands. There were designated shipping routes and signal fires were utilized on the land were used as aides for navigation. Most trade occurred between what are now two of the largest trading ports, Los Angeles and Long Beach, which was about a day's paddle.

Tomols were so useful as to give rise to a new class in Chumash society: a guild known as the 'Brotherhood of the Canoe' which was "responsible for the construction of each new tomol, its boat-building knowledge handed down through the generation from senior craftsman to apprentice. Only male members of leading families were allowed to own tomol. Grizzly or black bearskin identified the owners. When carefully maintained, the boats could last for decades and were passed down from one generation to the next.

By 650 A.D., it is believed the tomol or te'aat was already of central importance to the Chumash and Tongva/Kizh respectively. In 1542, Spanish explorer Juan Rodriguez Cabrillo recorded that he saw so many tomols hauled up at a particular wealthy village—a location eventually to be referred to by later settlers as Malibu—that he named it pueblo de las canoas or "town of canoes." Another explorer recorded the brotherhood doing boat carpentry in another village, and named it Carpinteria.

Some scholars report that sewn plank technology may have been introduced by early Polynesian navigators sometime late in the first millennium, who had constructed sewn plank boats and had been known to have reached South America. Scholars state that "three native Californian boat terms are argued to be Polynesian loans: Chumashan tomol(o), and Gabrielino tarainxa (or taraina) and ti?at." Some modern Chumash and Tongva/Kizh state that “this is something we have always known happened." This was further explained in a short documentary episode by KCET produced in 2019.

Partially intact tomols have been found in ancient Channel Islands middens along with dolphin bones, seal and fish bones, and abalone, clam, and limpet shells. The Santa Barbara Museum of Natural History, the Santa Barbara Maritime Museum, and The Chumash Maritime Association of California house reconstructed tomols created by contemporary Chumash.

== Gallery ==
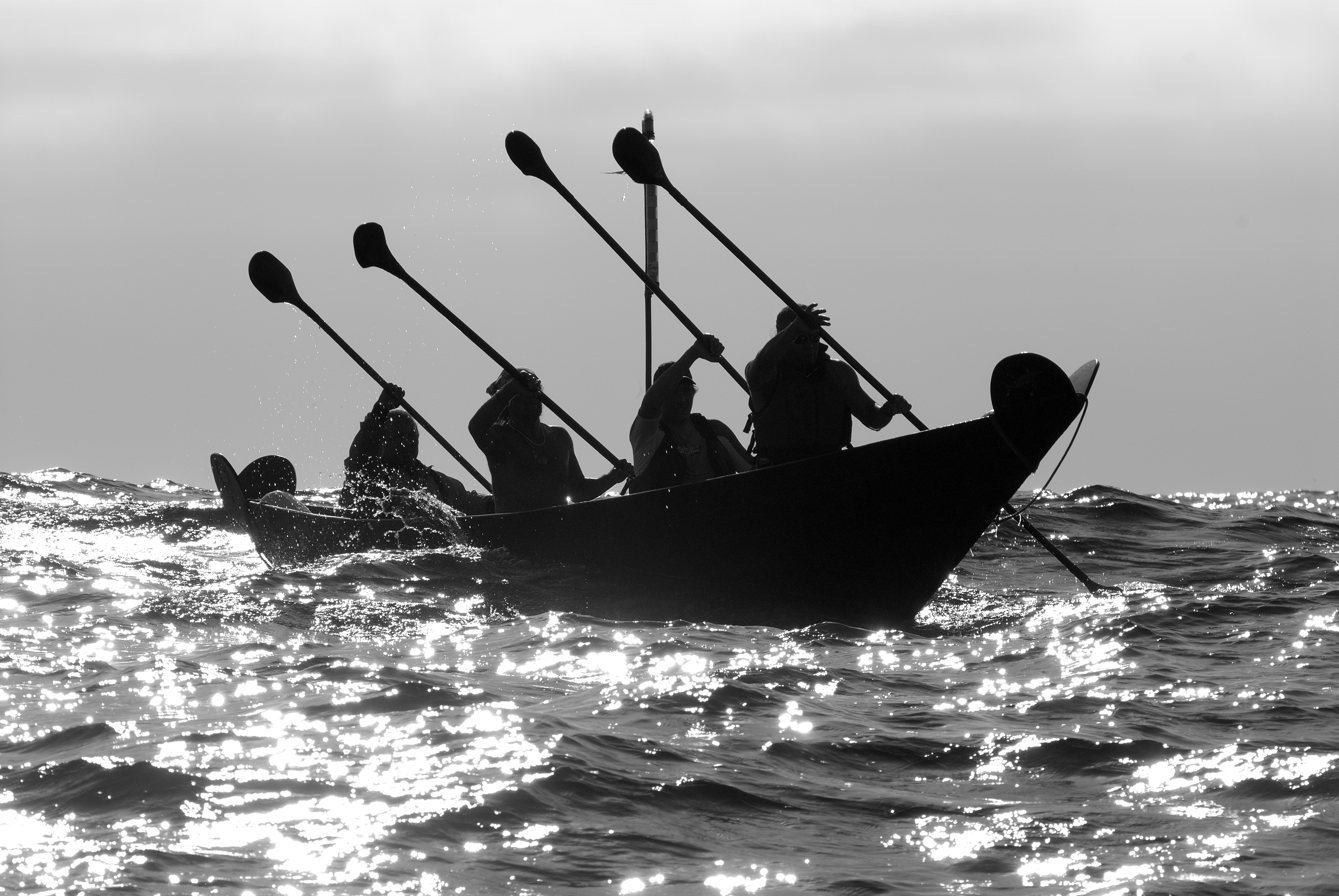
Paddlers making the crossing to Santa Cruz Island aboard the reconstructed tomol ‘Elye’wun, in 2006.

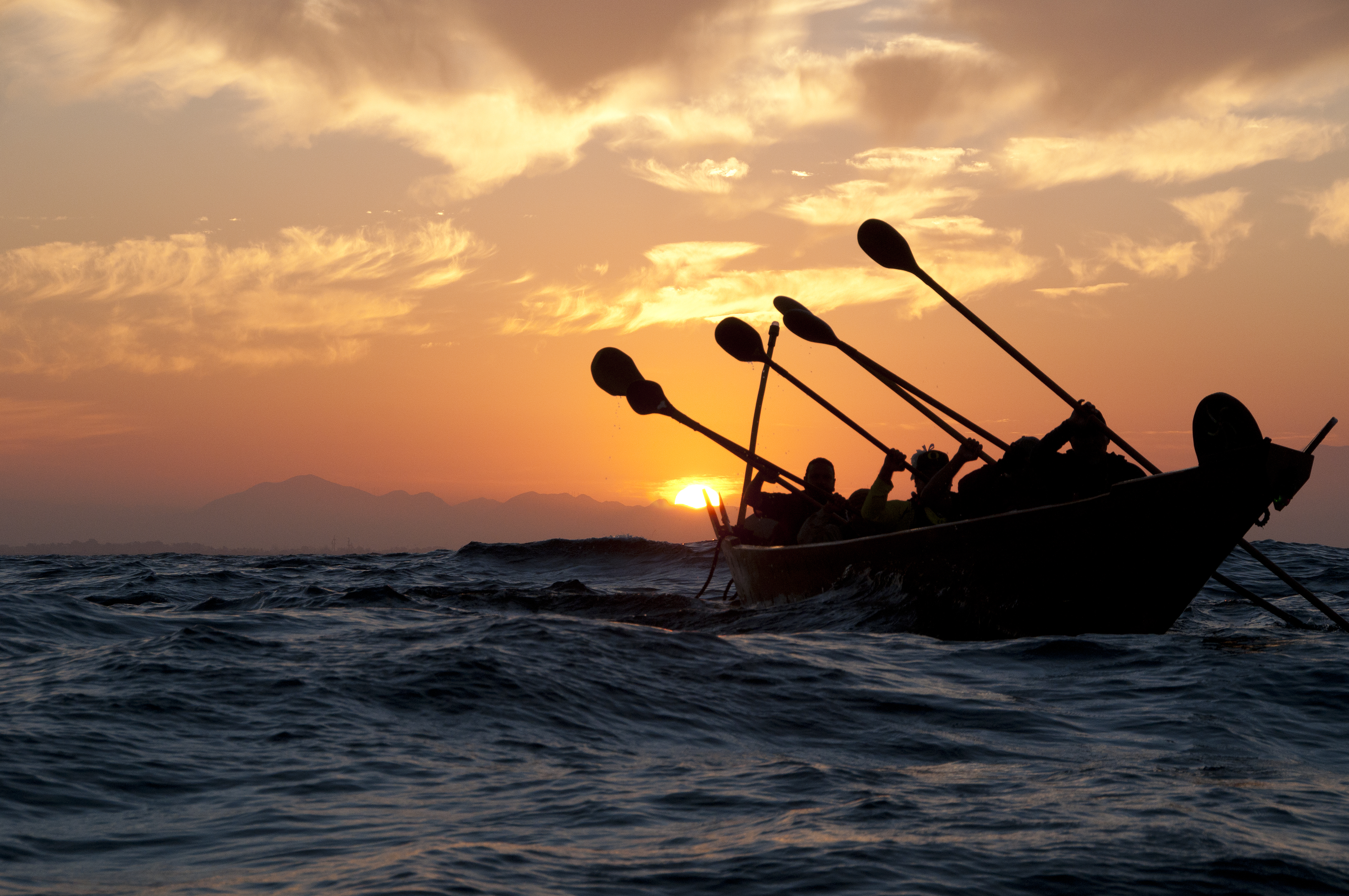
Tomol crossing Channel Islands in 2012

== Resources ==
- "Dark Water Journey: Power of memories guides paddler on historic crossing" by Eva Pagaling
- S2 E1: Rethinking the Coast with the Ti'at Society, from Tending Nature on KCET
- Baby Ti’at: The Making of a Traditional Canoe, ibid.
