= Suangna, California =

Suangna (also, Shua-vit, Suagna, and Suang-na) is a former Tongva (Gabrieleño) Native American settlement in Los Angeles County, California. There is a plaque set in stone commemorating the village in Carson.

It may have also been referred to as Swaanga, which was recorded as one of the largest villages in the region. Evidence of the village may have still been recognizable as late as 1852. A local historian in the area provided a potential location as "the side of the hill above what is now Anaheim Street between the Harbor Freeway and Gaffey Street. Silka adds that the village was located near a crossing of major Native American trails, which today is located at the intersection of Gaffey and Anaheim Streets, Vermont Avenue and Palos Verdes Drive North, commonly called Five Points." However, others have placed the village at a different location.

== See also ==
- Category: Tongva populated places
  - Tongva language
- Ranchos of California
- Spanish missions in California
