= Pasinogna, California =

Human settlement in California, United States of America

Coordinates: 33°59′24″N 117°43′03″W

Pasinogna (also, Pasinog-na and Passinogna) is a former Tongva-Gabrieleño Native American settlement in San Bernardino County, California.

This Indian village, identified by name by Hugo Reid in his seminal work on local tribes in 1852, was not, however, specified by location. It is known that it was located on the Rancho Santa Ana del Chino, in the Chino Hills, near present-day Chino. Probably, like many other villages, where ranchos were later located, it was in the vicinity of the adobe of the Rancho Santa Ana del Chino, near Chino Creek or its tributary Little Chino Creek. That later creek, with Carbon Canyon to its west, would provide an easy route through the Chino Hills that would connect it to the villages of the coastal plain of what is now Orange County.

== See also ==
- Battle of Chino
- Category: Tongva populated places
  - Tongva language
- California mission clash of cultures
- List of ghost towns in California
- Ranchos in California
