= Saway-yanga, California =

Settlement in California, United States

Saway-yanga is a former Tongva (Fernandeño) Native American settlement in Los Angeles County, California.

It was located near Mission San Fernando Rey de España in the San Fernando Valley.

== See also ==
- Category: Tongva populated places
  - Tongva language
- Spanish missions in California
  - California mission clash of cultures
  - Ranchos of California
