= Skull and crossbones (military) =

Usage as a symbol or insignia

Skull and crossbones variations have been used by several military forces. The "Jolly Roger", traditionally used by pirates, has been used by submarines.

== Usage ==
=== Naval warfare ===
The Jolly Roger is the name given to any of various flags flown to identify a ship's crew as pirates. Since the decline of piracy, various military units have used the Jolly Roger, usually in skull-and-crossbones design, as a unit identification insignia or a victory flag to ascribe to themselves the proverbial ferocity and toughness of pirates.

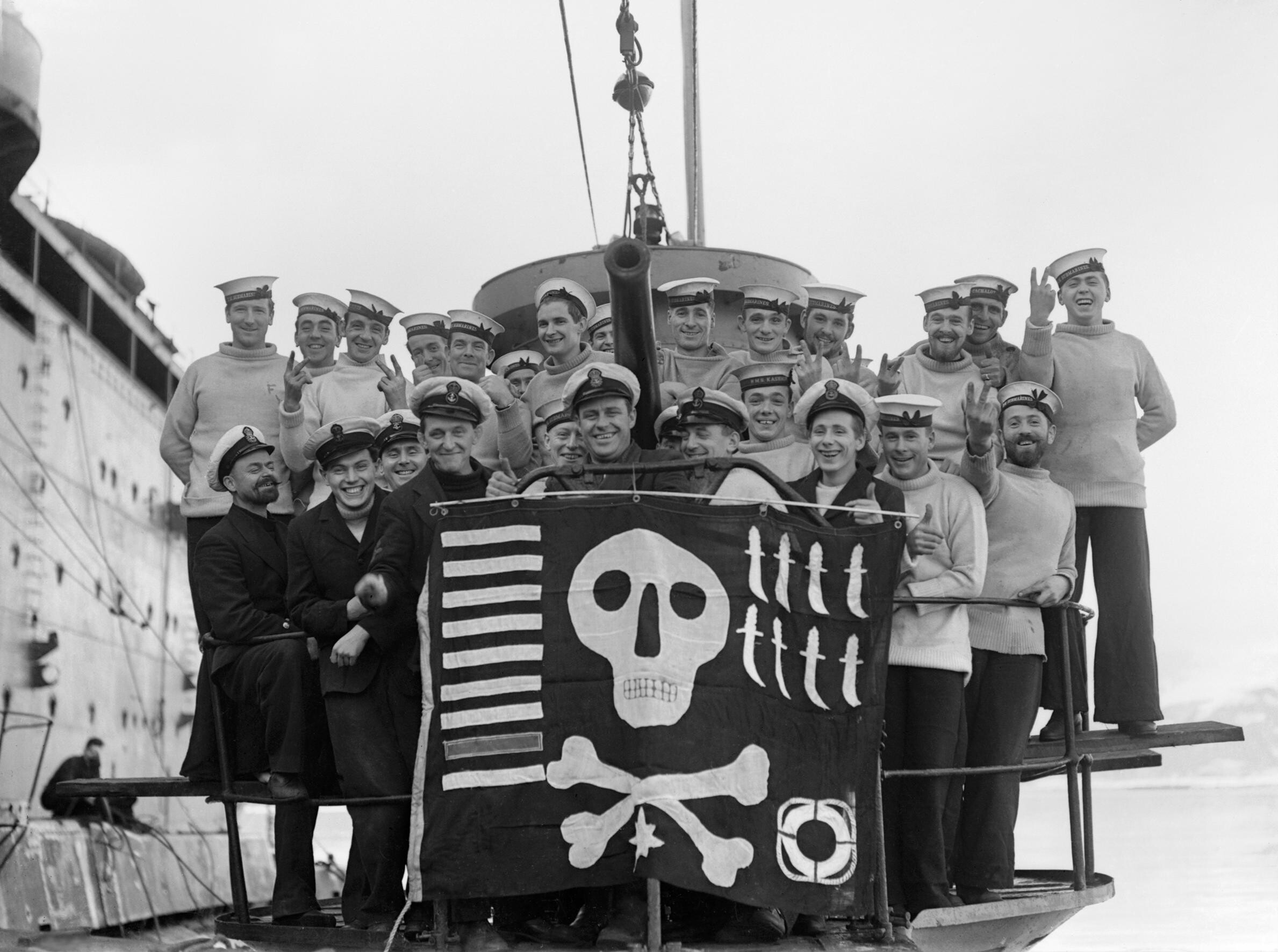
Members of the crew of HMS Utmost with their "Jolly Roger" success flag, photographed alongside the submarine depot ship HMS Forth in Holy Loch, on their return from a year's service in the Mediterranean on 6 February 1942

Admiral Sir Arthur Wilson VC, the Controller of the Royal Navy, summed up the opinion of the many in the Admiralty at the time when in 1901 he said submarines were "underhand, unfair, and damned un-English. ... treat all submarines as pirates in wartime ... and hang all crews." In response, Lieutenant Commander (later Admiral Sir) Max Horton first flew the Jolly Roger on return to port after sinking the German cruiser SMS Hela and the destroyer SMS S116 in 1914 while in command of the E-class submarine HMS E9.

In World War II it became common practice for the submarines of the Royal Navy to fly the Jolly Roger on completion of a successful combat mission where some action had taken place, but as an indicator of bravado and stealth rather than of lawlessness. The Jolly Roger is now the emblem of the Royal Navy Submarine Service.

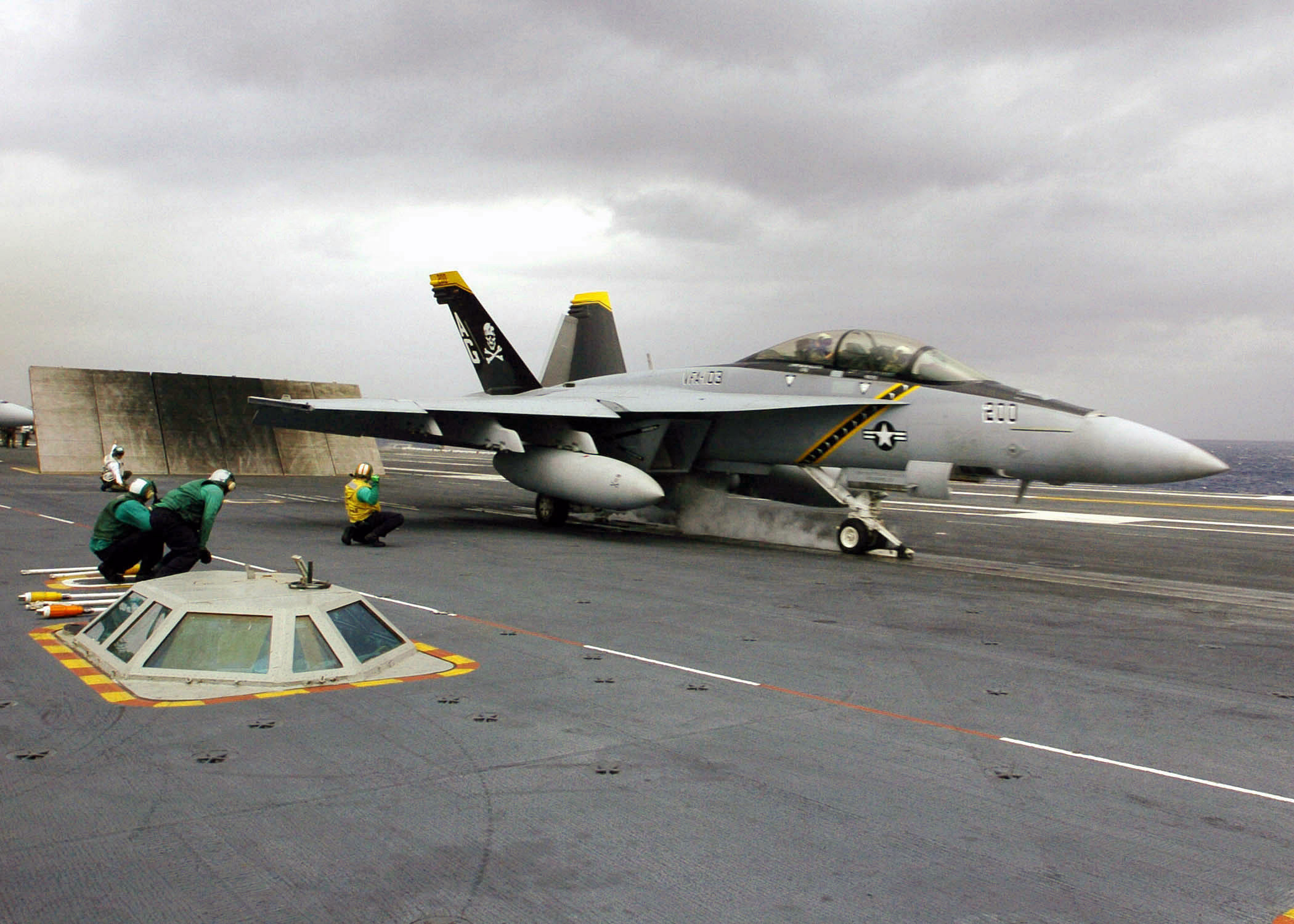
A US Navy F/A-18F Super Hornet aircraft assigned to the "Jolly Rogers" of Strike Fighter Squadron 103 (VFA-103), prepares to launch from the flight deck of the Nimitz-class aircraft carrier USS Dwight D. Eisenhower in 2006

Three distinct U.S. Naval Aviation squadrons have used the name and insignia of the Jolly Roger: VF-61 (originally VF-17), VF-84, and VFA-103. While these are distinctly different squadrons that have no lineal linkage, they all share the same "Jolly Roger" name, the skull and crossbones insignia and traditions. The first incarnation of the "Jolly Rogers" was established on 1 January 1943 at NAS Norfolk, as VF-17, flying the F4U Corsair. Inspired by the piratical theme of the aircraft's name, VF-17's commanding officer Tommy Blackburn selected the Jolly Roger as the squadron's insignia. The current squadron to hold the name is the VFA-103, Strike Fighter Squadron 103 (the "Jolly Rogers"), the skull and crossbones on all-black tails makes them easily identifiable.

The United States Marine Corps Reconnaissance Battalions use skull and crossbones on their emblems, and so do several aviation squadrons in the Air Force, Navy and Marine Corps.

=== Land warfare ===
The Chetnik Detachments of the Yugoslav Army flag, the inscription reads: "For king and fatherland; freedom or death"

Hussars, lancers and dragoons became established types of military units, with their typical uniform patterns (and weapons and tactics) maintained in many armies. Since the mid-18th century, skull and crossbones symbols have been officially used in European militaries as badges on uniforms. One of the first regiments to adopt them was the friderizian Hussars in 1741, also known as the "Totenkopfhusaren." From this tradition, the skull became an important symbol in German and later international militaries. It was utilized in the Prussian army, after World War I by Freikorps, and in Nazi Germany by the Wehrmacht and the SS (see below). Due to its usage in military contexts and its connotations of uncompromising strength and avant-garde, the skull symbol also became a significant emblem of rebellion in subcultures and youth cultures.

In Chile, during the independence battles, a paramilitary guerrilla group against the royal Spanish army composed mainly by bandits and civilians, called Los húsares de la muerte (The Death Hussars) wore a Skull with two crossed femurs on the neck of their jackets.

In the Estonian War of Independence the skull and crossbones were symbols of Kuperjanov's Partisan Battalion. The badge is still used in the Estonian Army by the Kuperjanov Battalion, for example 2007 in Iraq.

Though not employing a black uniform, the skull and crossbones has been used by a succession of lancer regiments in the British Army. This origin dates back to the 17th Light Dragoons, a unit raised in 1759 following General Wolfe's death at Quebec, with an emblem of a death's head and the motto 'Or Glory' in commemoration of him. It was later used by the 17th/21st Lancers, the Queen's Royal Lancers, and now the Royal Lancers, who use the skull and crossbones as their Motto. They have also inherited the nickname of the 'Death or Glory Boys'.

In 1792, a regiment of Hussards de la Mort (Death Hussars) was formed during the French Revolution by the French National Assembly and were organized and named by Kellerman. The group of 200 volunteers were from wealthy families and their horses were supplied from the King's Stables. They were formed to defend against various other European states in the wake of the revolution. They participated in the Battle of Valmy and its members also participated in the Battle of Fleurus (1794). They had the following mottos: Vaincre ou mourir, La liberté ou la mort and Vivre libre ou mourir - Victory or death; Freedom or death; and Live free or die.

The 2nd Lancers Regiment of the Portuguese Army also use the skull and crossbones as symbol and "Death or Glory" as motto, as the regiment was raised by a former colonel of the British 17th Lancers.

During the Russian Civil War, the troops of the White Kornilov Division wore patches emblazoned with a skull and crossbones above a pair of crossed swords.

When Hitler gained power, there were still uniforms that were black and with a rather large (≈10 cm) skull and crossbones on a black cap, but the pattern was adapted for the Nazi SS service, with a "peaked cap" and a tiny skull and crossbones for the cap (≈2.5 cm). And in World War II, Nazi SS troops made use of the "Totenkopf" (German word for "dead man's head") as an insignia for another part of the uniform as well (in particular, the 3rd SS Division, which was a part of the larger Waffen SS), and also by the similarly named World War II-era Luftwaffe's 54th Bomber Wing (Kampfgeschwader 54).

In the former Yugoslavia, and especially Serbia, the skull and crossbones was a prominent symbol used by the Serbian royalist and nationalist paramilitaries known as the Chetniks during the Second World War and the Yugoslav Wars.The Chetnik Detachments of the Yugoslav Army, commonly known as the Chetniks (Serbo-Croatian: Četnici, Четници, pronounced [tʃɛ̂tniːtsi]; Slovene: Četniki), was a World War II movement in Yugoslavia led by Draža Mihailović.

The 3rd Infantry Division of the Republic of Korea Army used skull and crossbones symbol on their division symbol patch.

=== Aerial warfare ===
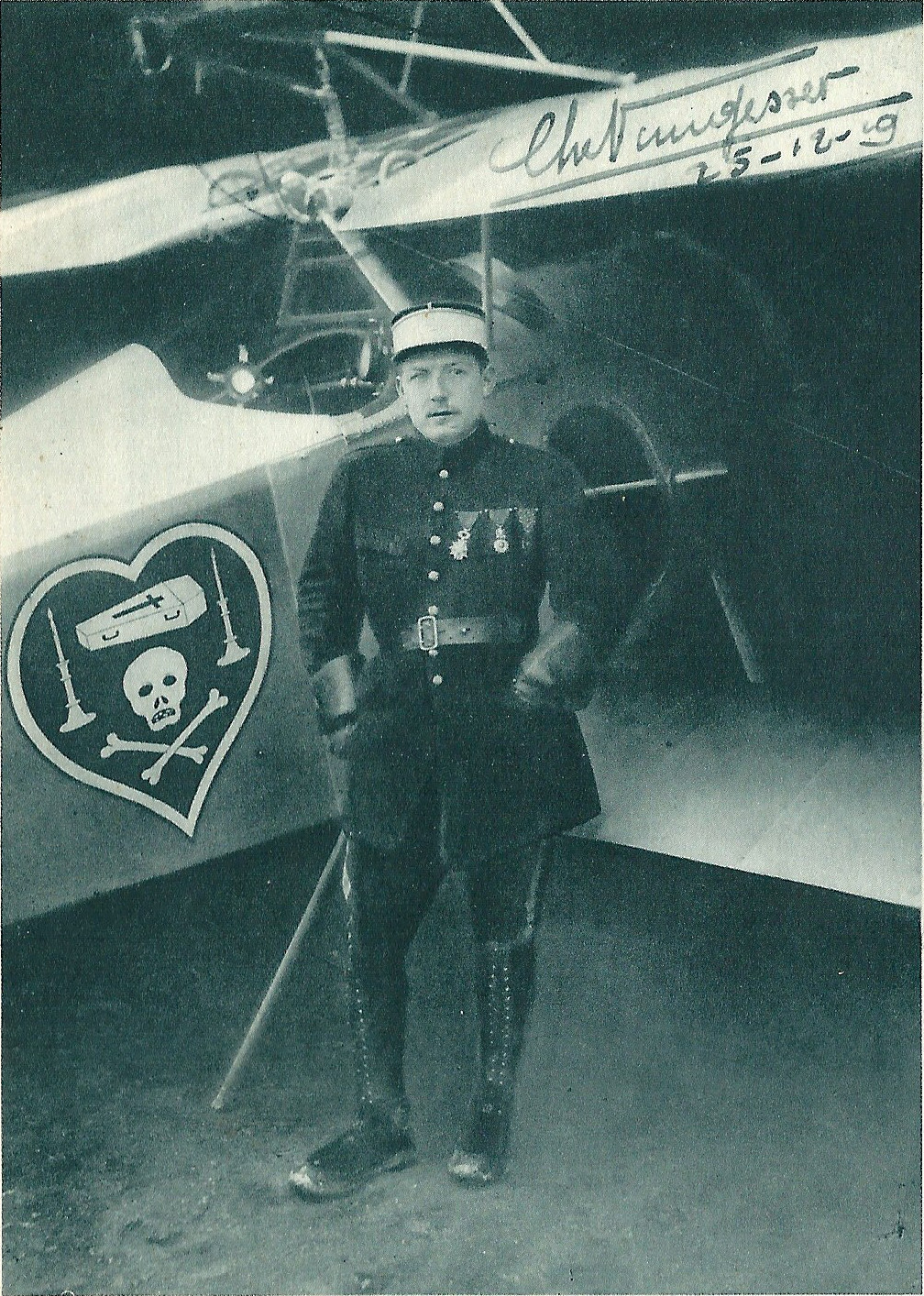
Charles Nungesser with his insignia.

Fighter aircraft of both the Allied Powers and the Central Powers occasionally made use of the a skull and crossbones emblem in World War I, either by itself or as part of a more complex insignia, more often by individual pilots, and in rare instances, by entire aviation units, for example, No 100 Sqn Royal Air Force. The most memorable of these insignia were on the series of French fighter aircraft flown by French 43-victory flying ace Charles Nungesser. All of his aircraft featured his personal "black heart" insignia on the sides of the aircraft's fuselage. The Nungesser insignia centered on a skull and crossbones accompanied by a coffin directly above the skull, and flanked with single candlesticks, all within the black heart-shaped field.

== Death symbol bans ==
In 2018 the incoming Australian Defence Force chief Lt. Gen. Angus Campbell banned the use of so-called death symbols because they are "at odds with Army's values and the ethical force we seek to build and sustain." The death symbols that were banned in Australia include the skull and crossbones, the comic book characters Phantom and Punisher, as well as the Grim Reaper.

== Image gallery ==
101 Squadron (Israel) Israeli Air Force

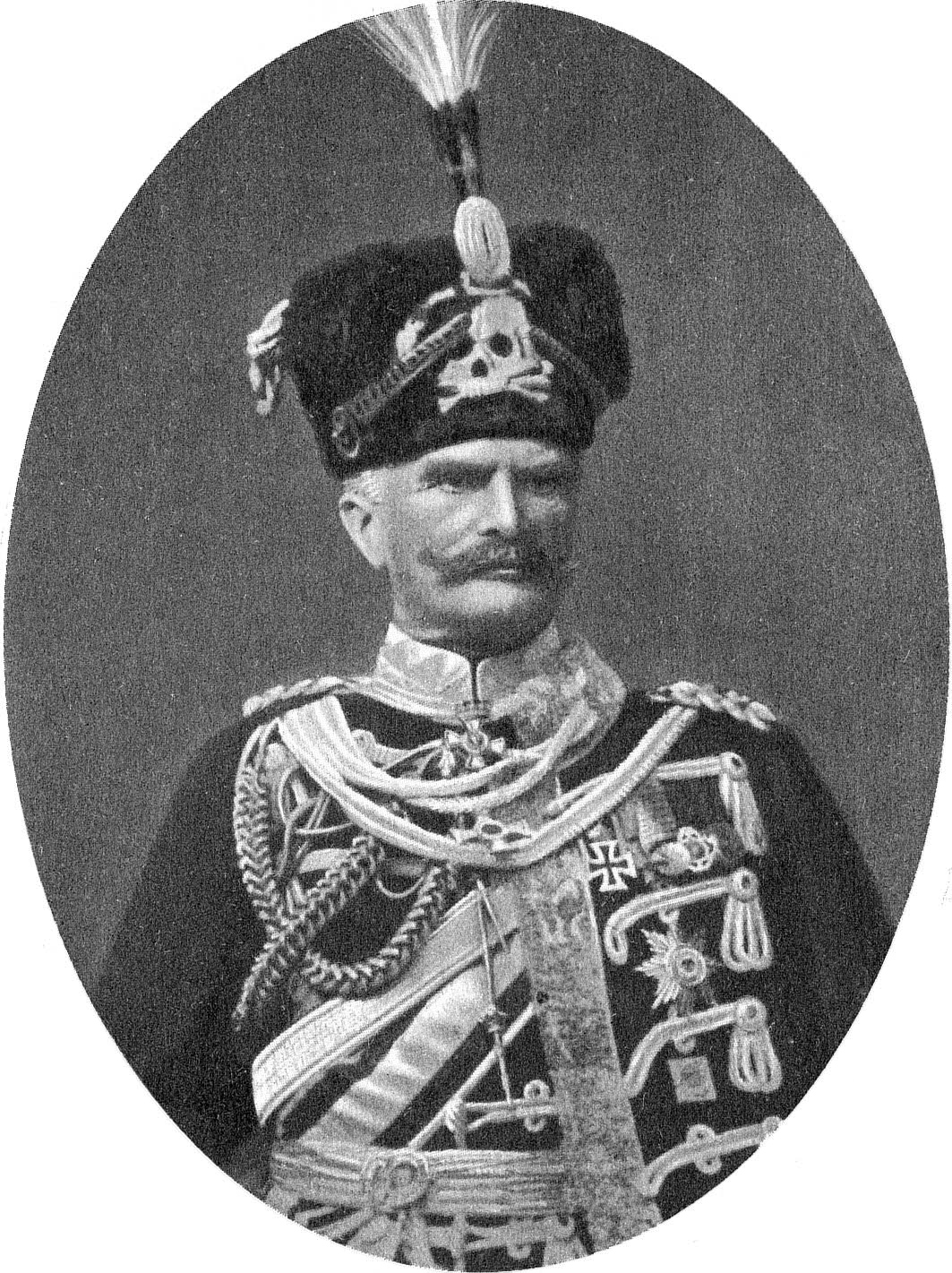
Field Marshal August von Mackensen with Deaths Head Hussars insignia

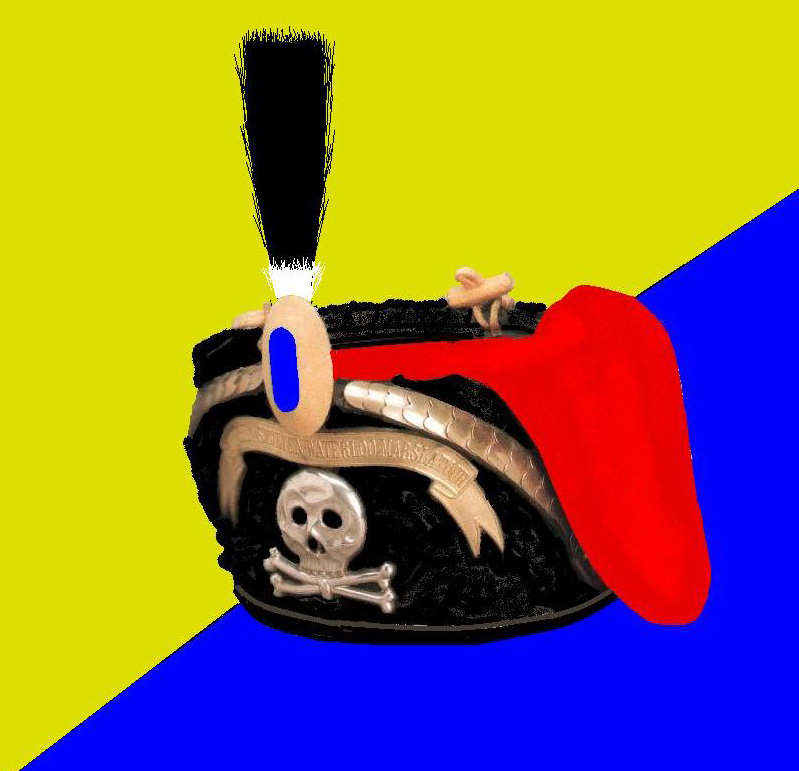
17th Brunswick Hussar Regiment, Prussia.

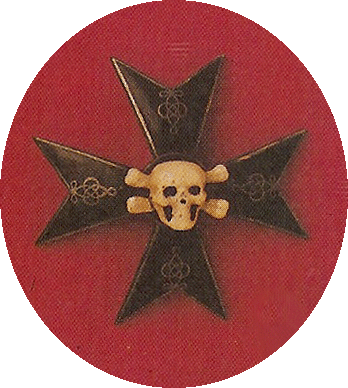
Officer's of Alexandrya Hussars Regiment Emblem

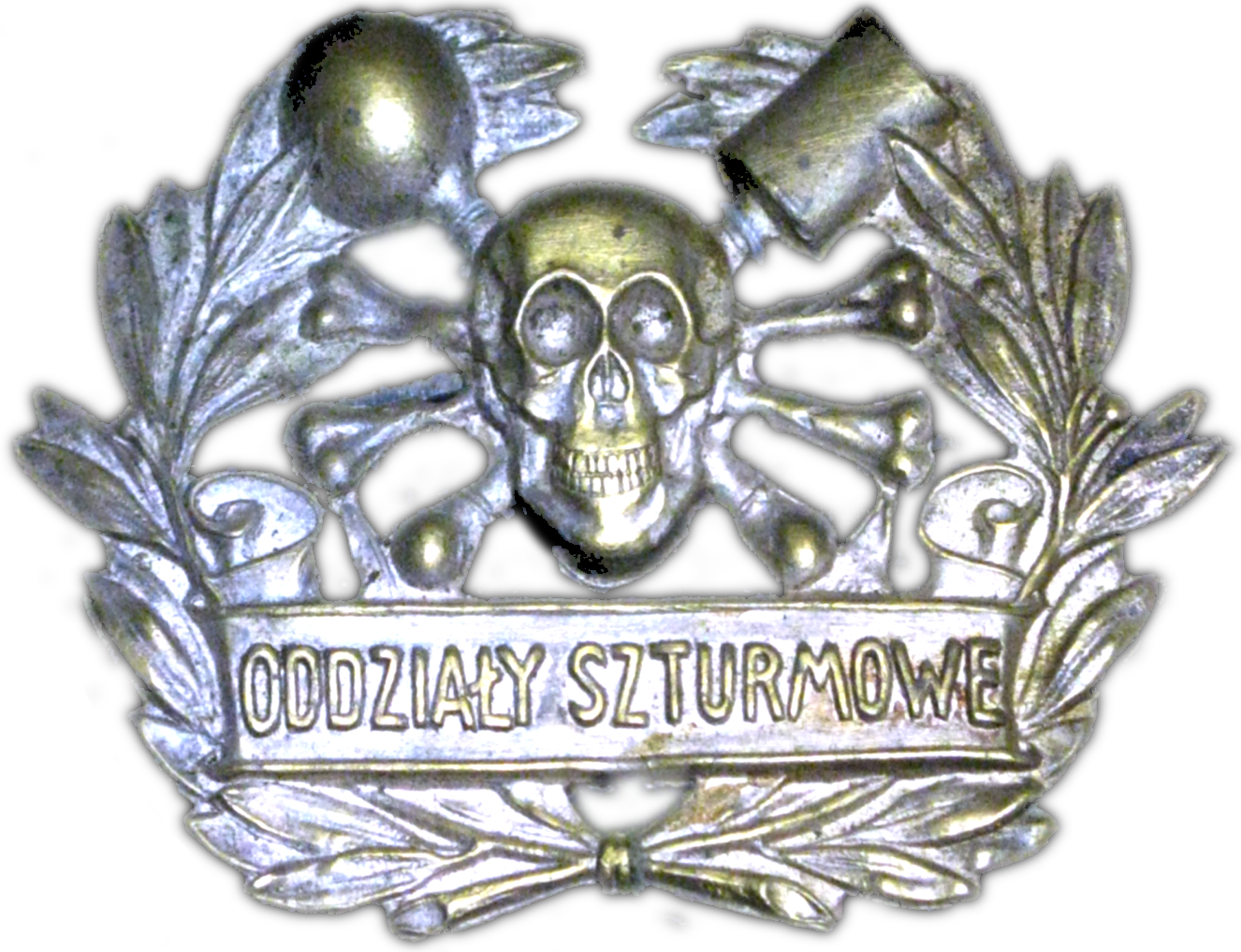
Polish Storm Detachment during Silesian Risings

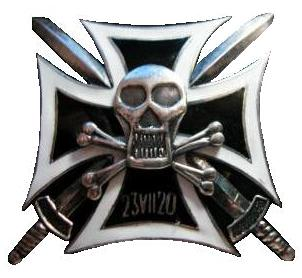
The "death's head" was the sign of Polish Death Hussar Divisions from 1920 (Polish–Soviet War)

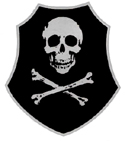
Kuperjanov Infantry Battalion, Estonian Defence Forces

Iron Division

Banner of the Dnipro Division, led by Svyryd Kotsur

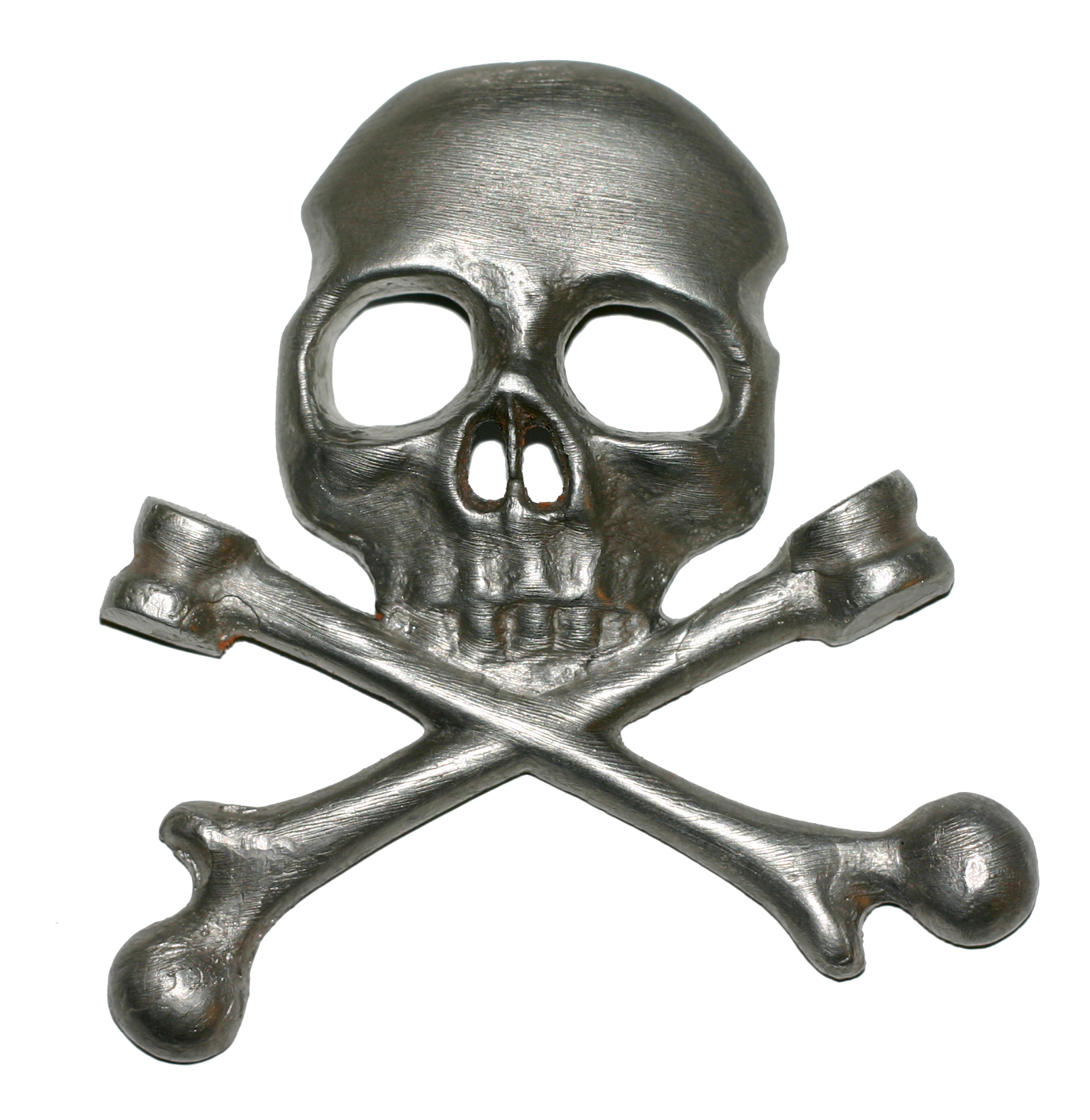
Braunschweiger Totenkopf

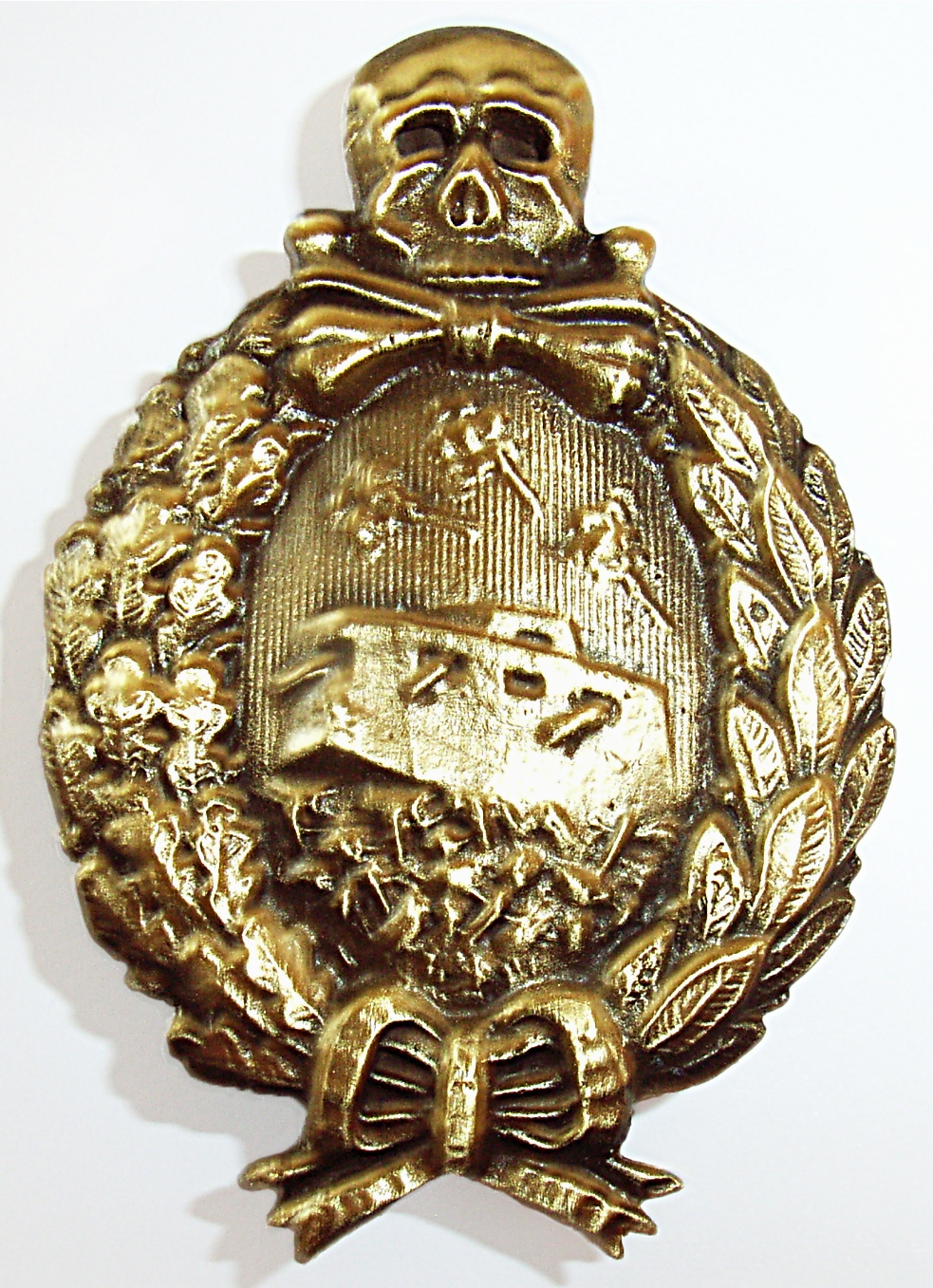
The Weimar Republic's Kampfwagen-Erinnerungsabzeichen

Kampfgeschwader 54

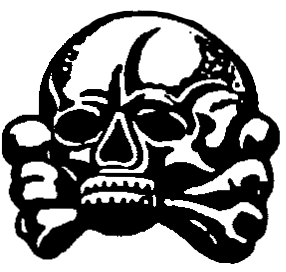
The traditional "Danziger" Totenkopf worn by the SS 1923-34

3rd SS Division

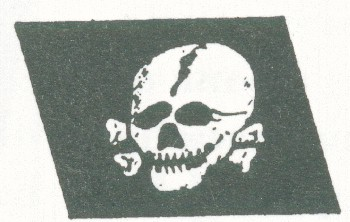
SS Death's Head Patch

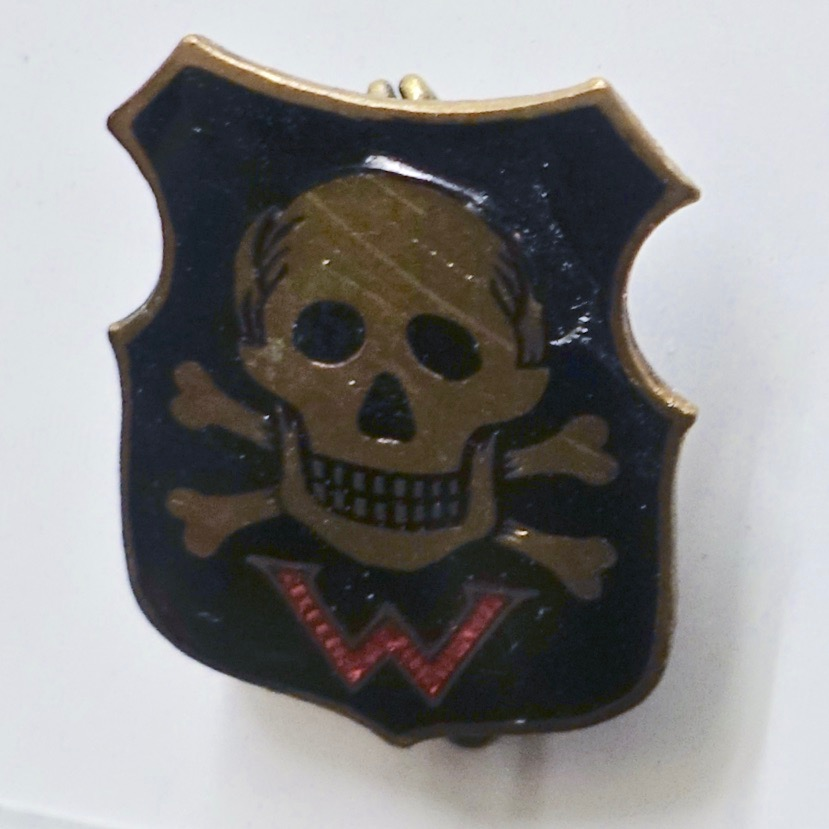
Werwolf badge

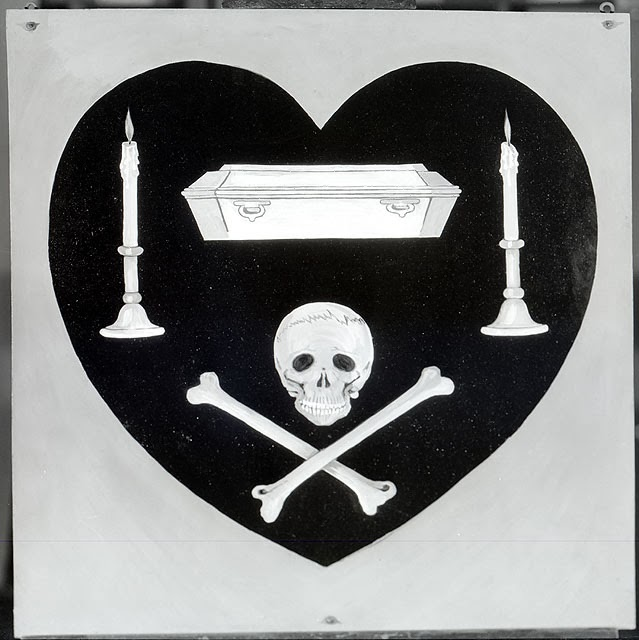
Charles Nungesser's personal insignia

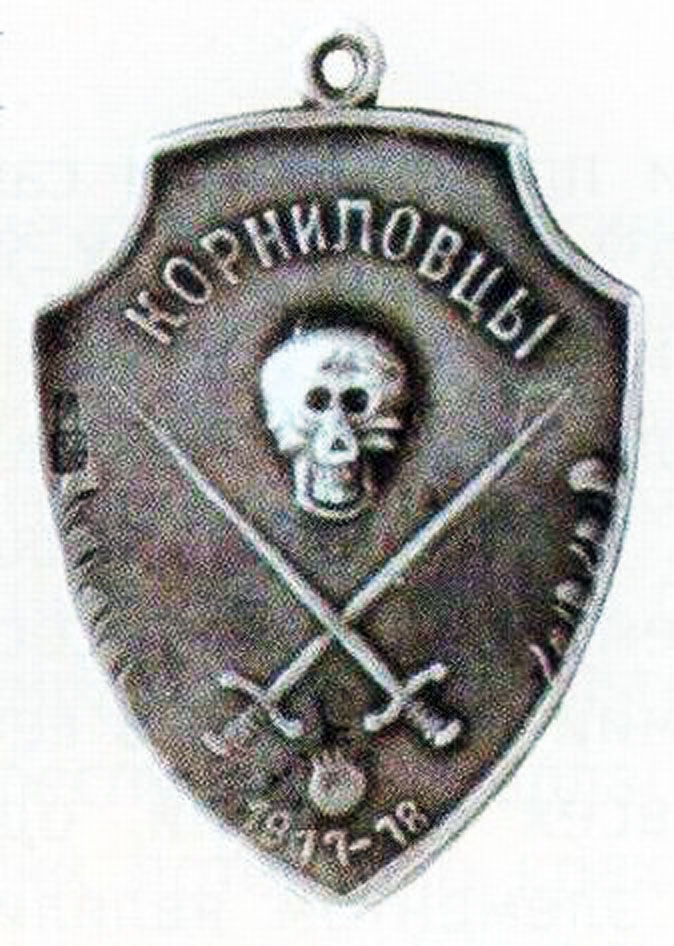
Kornilov Shock Regiment insignia

4th Commando Brigade, Biafra.

Special Police Operations Battalion, Brazil.

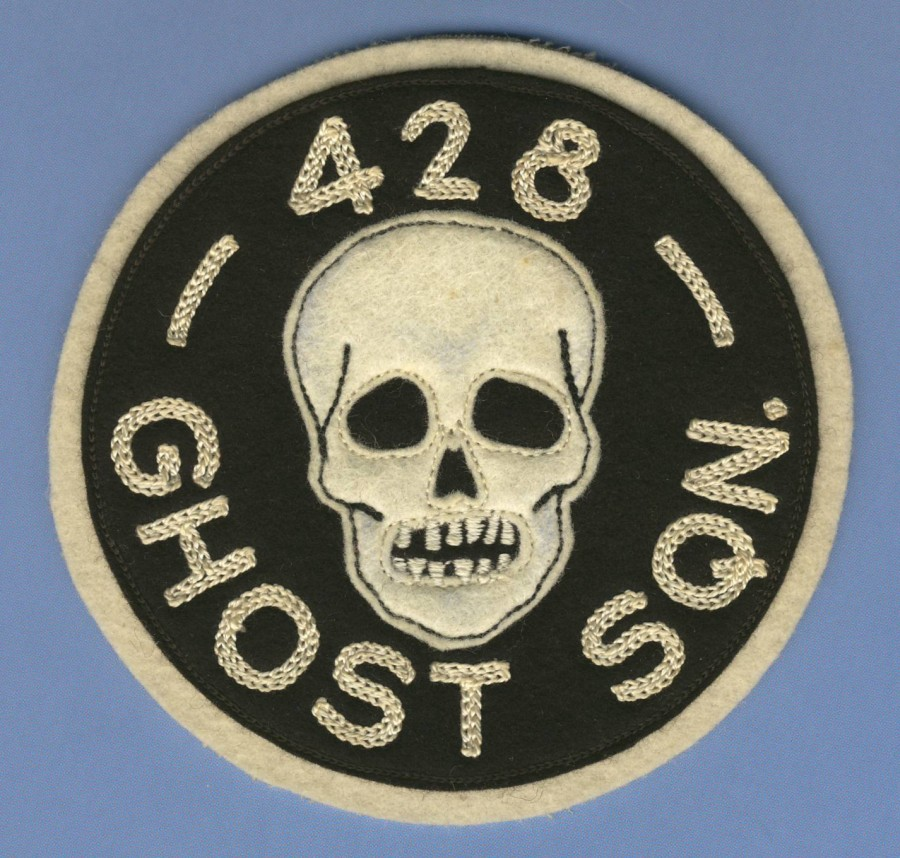
No. 428 Squadron, Canada.

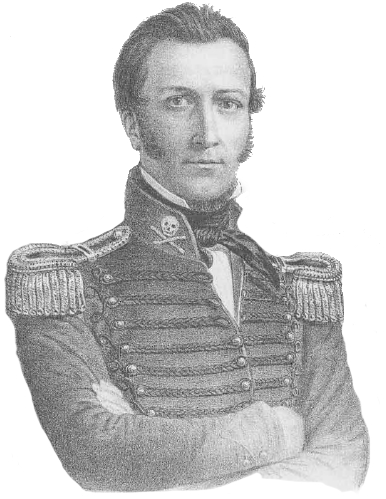
Death's Hussars, Chile.

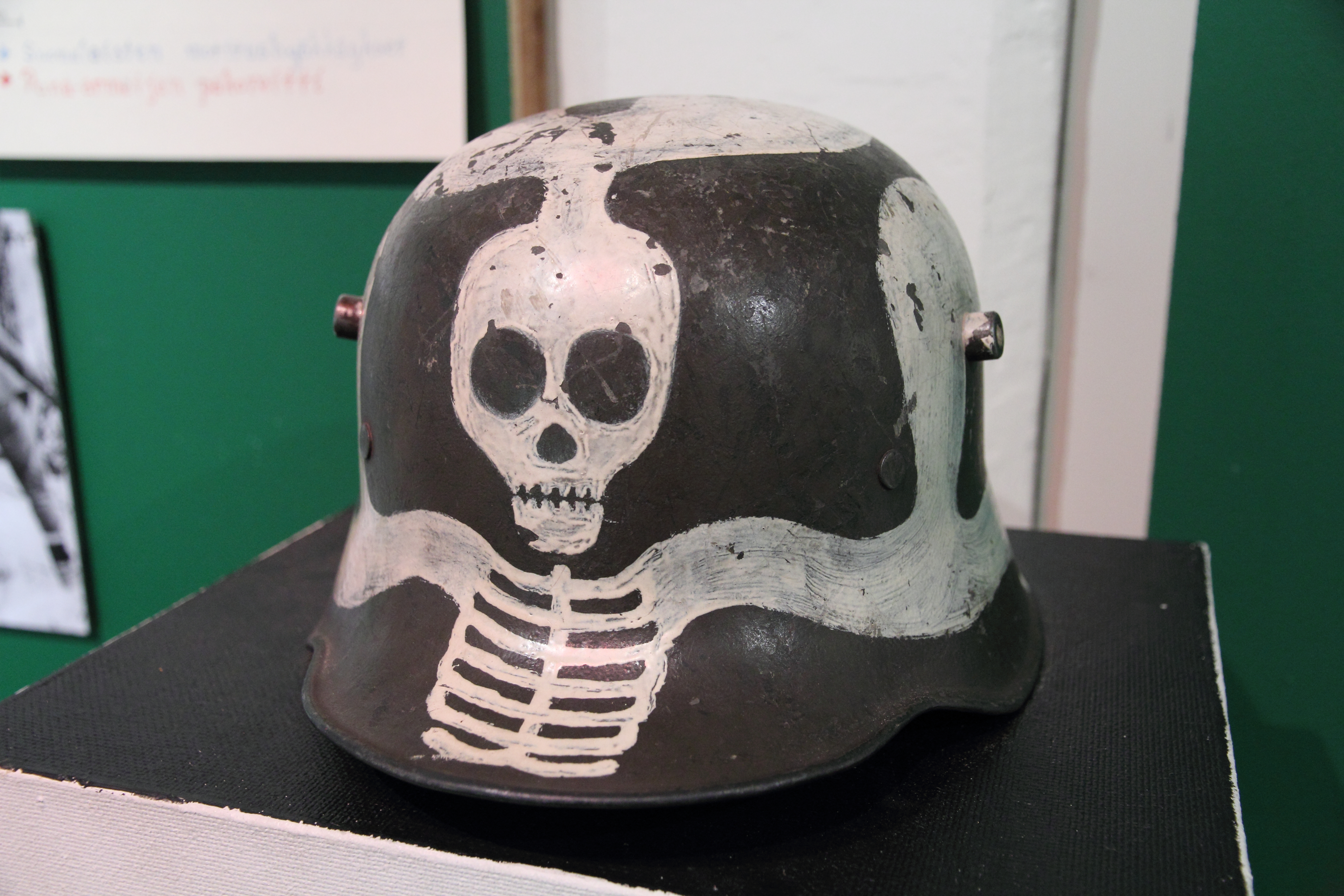
4th Light Detachment, Finland.

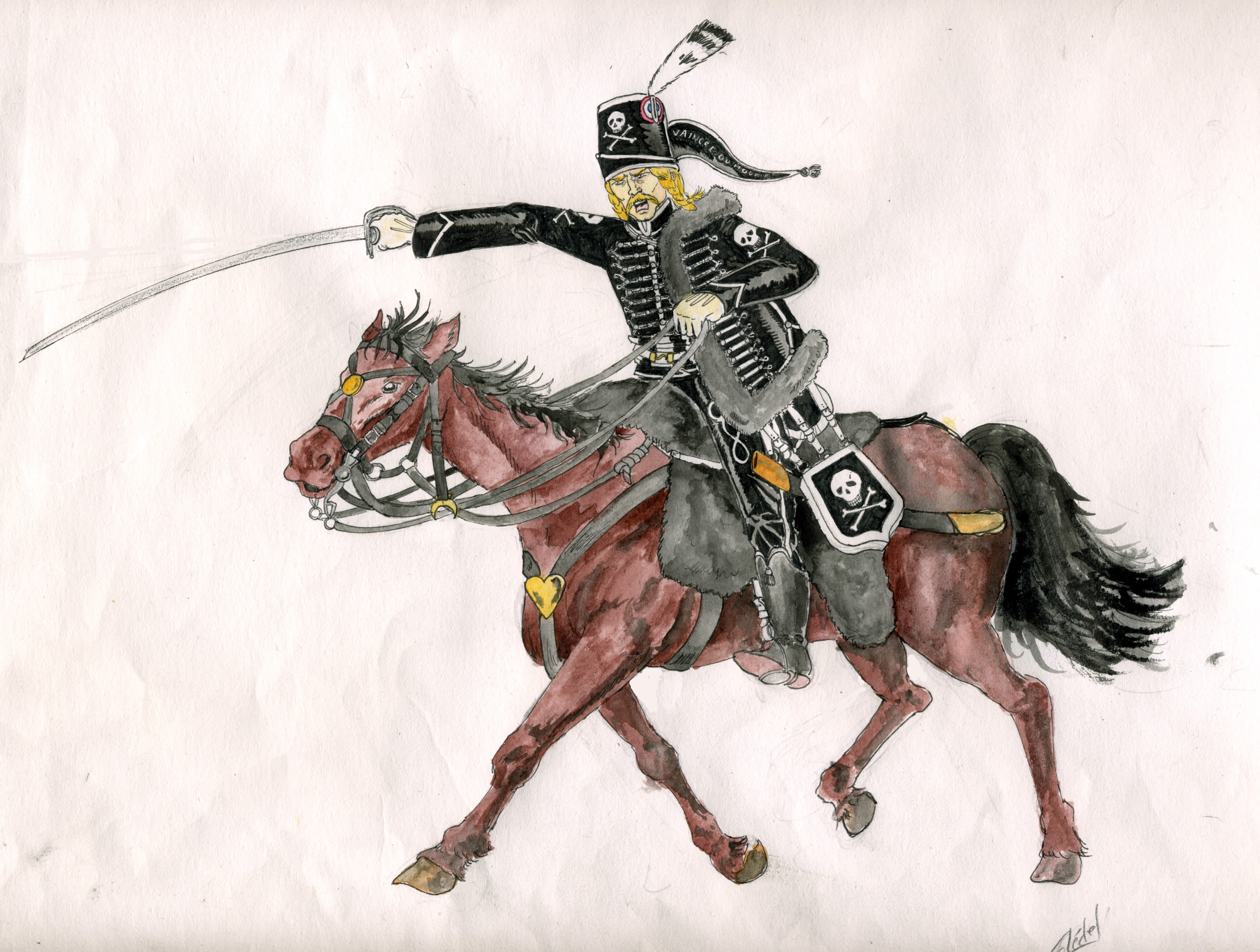
Death's Hussars, France.

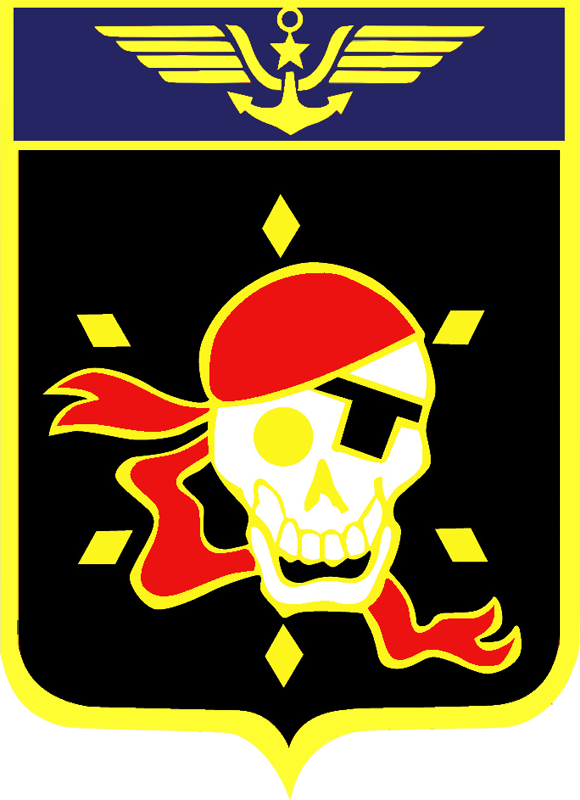
14F Squadron, France.

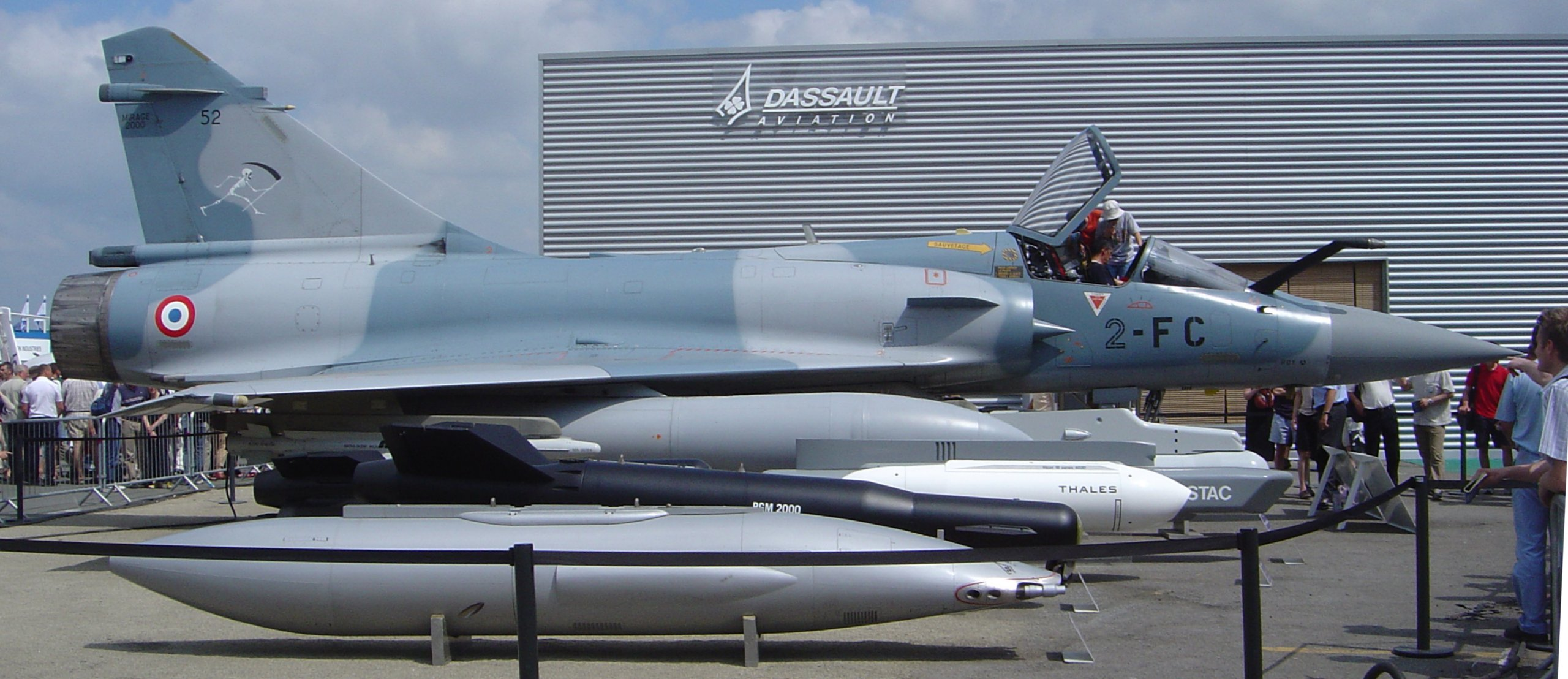
2/2 Fighter Squadron, France.

Charlie Company, 36th Commando Battalion, Iraq.

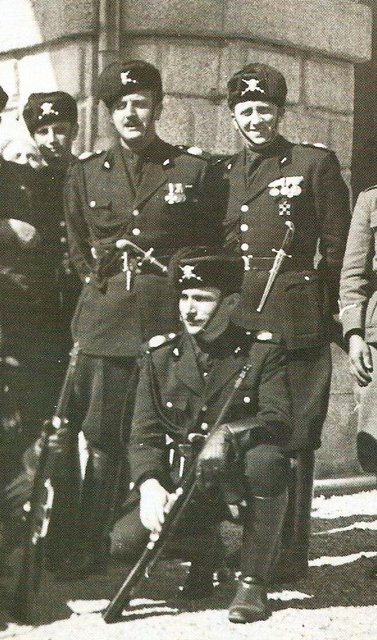
The Duce's Musketeers, Italy.

Blackshirts, Italy

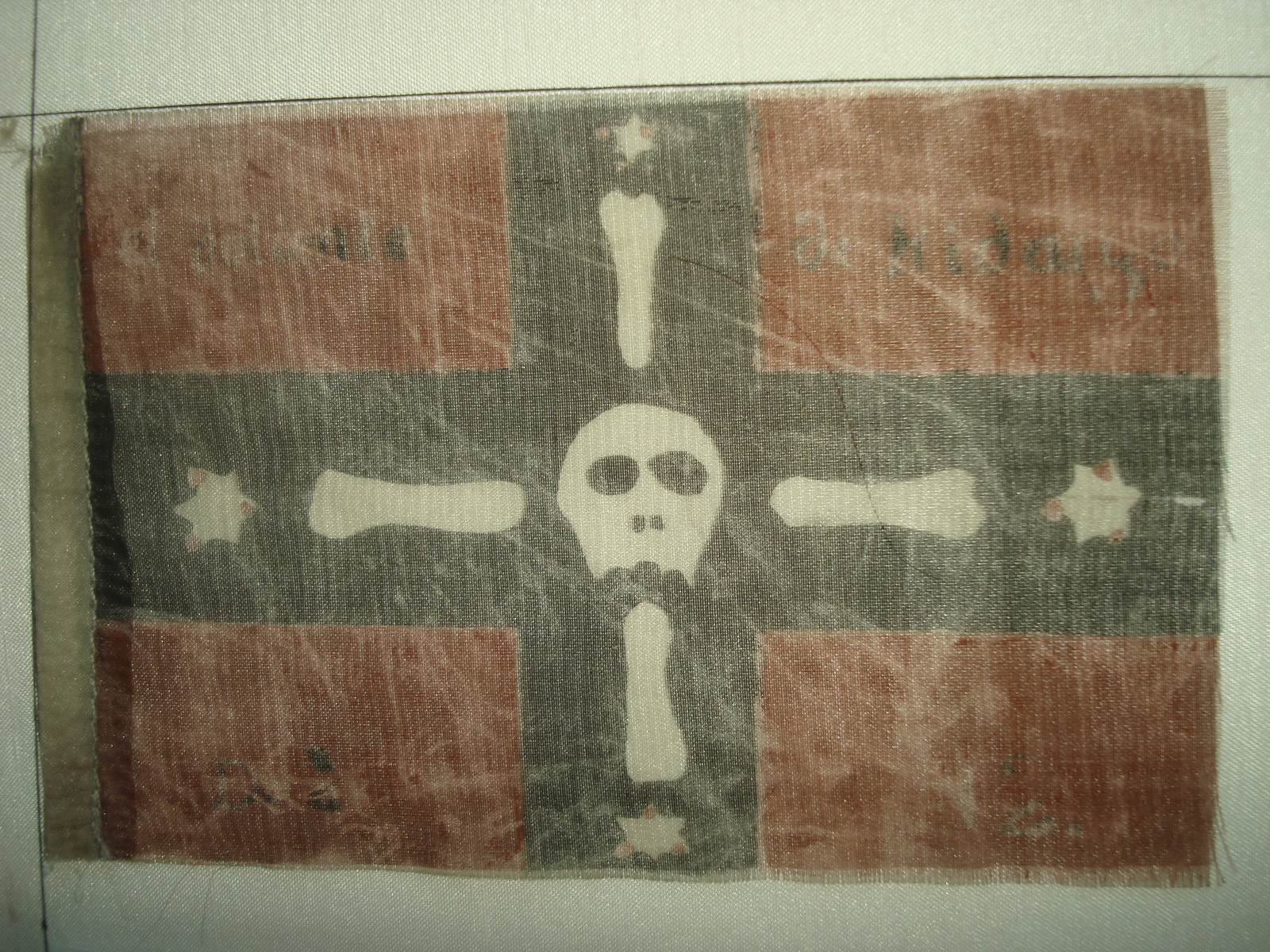
Death's Regiment, Mexico.

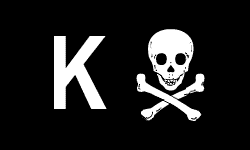
General Llanera personal flag, Philippines.

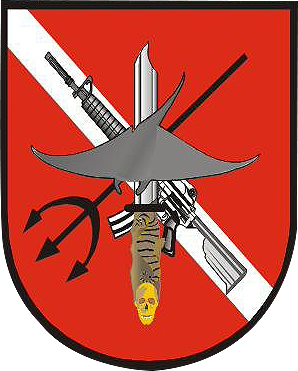
Special Forces, Philippines.

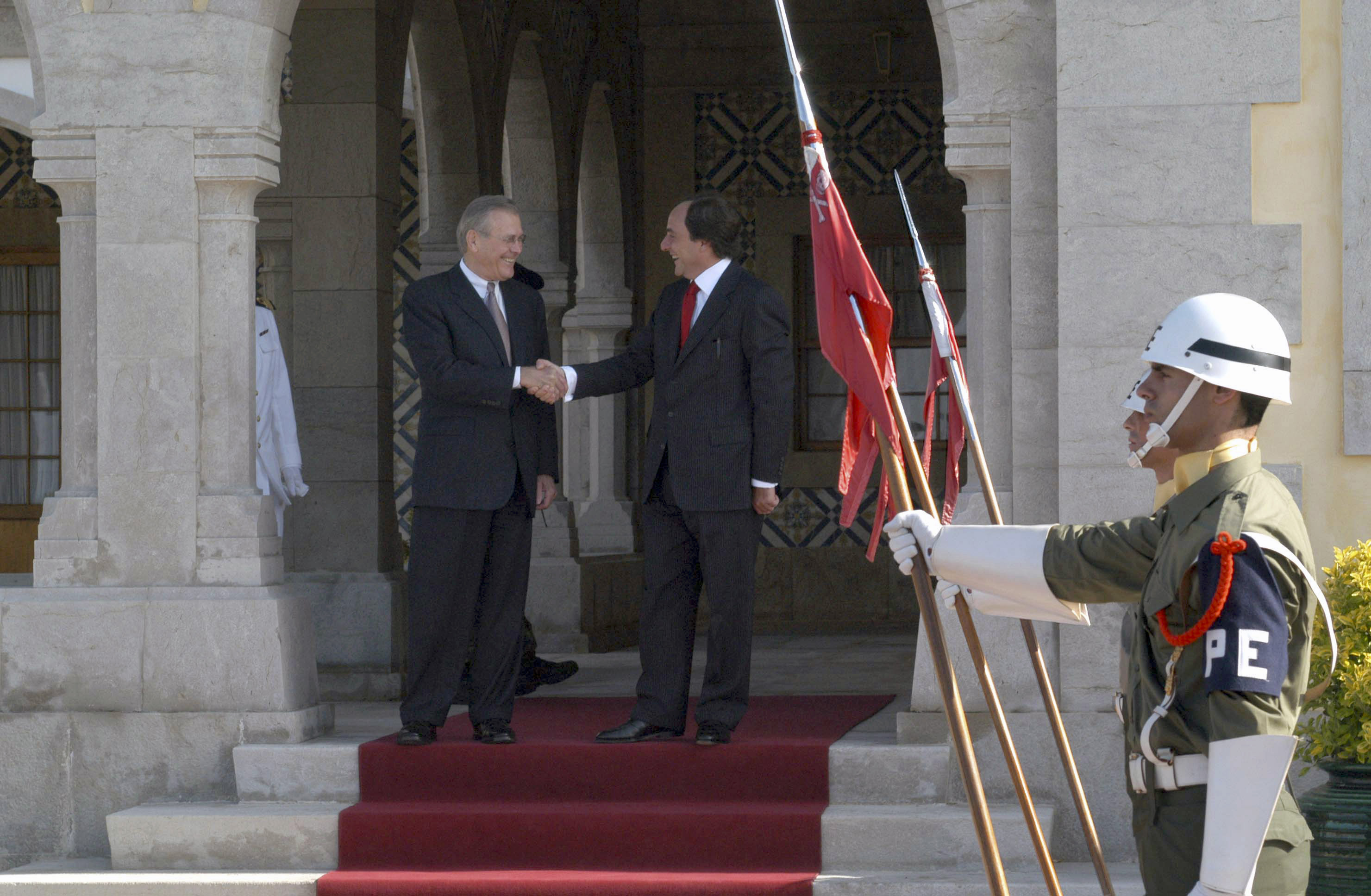
2nd Lancers Regiment, Portugal.

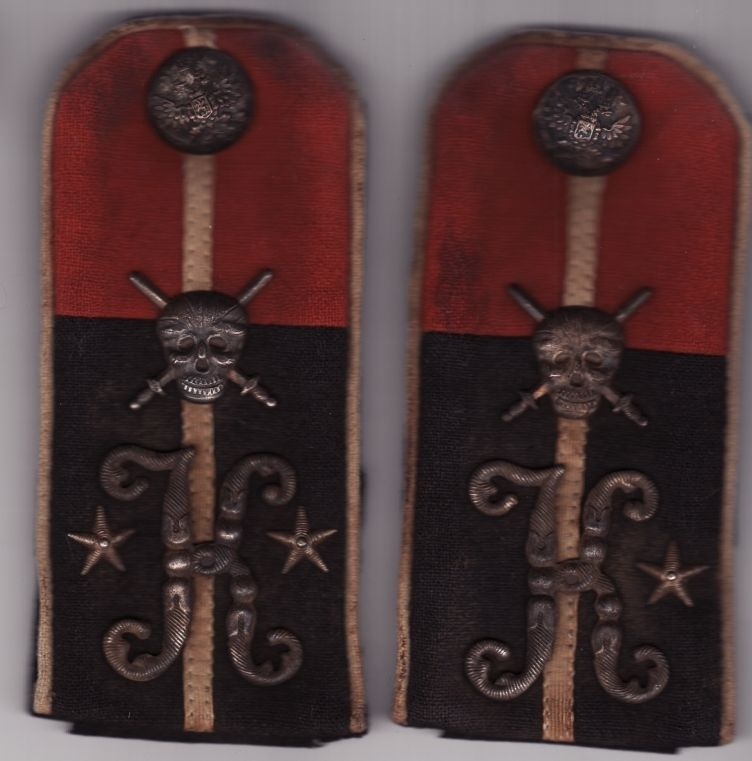
Kornilov Assault Regiment, Russia.

Varyag Battalion, Donetsk People's Republic.

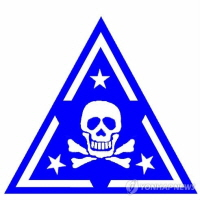
3rd Infantry Division, South Korea.

8th Lusitania Cavalry Regiment, Spain.

Republican Guard, Syria.

Defense Companies, Syria.

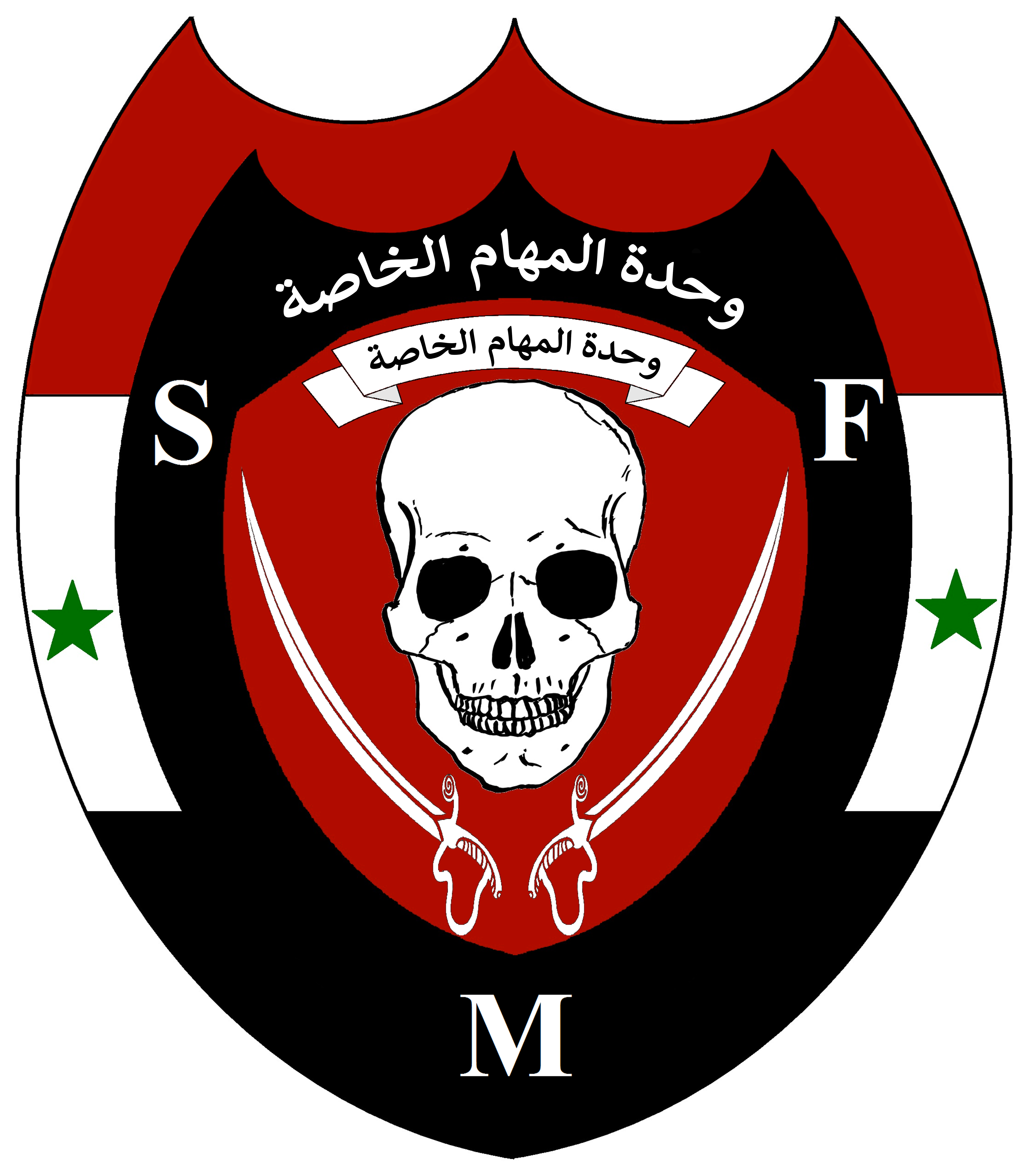
Special Mission Forces, Syria.

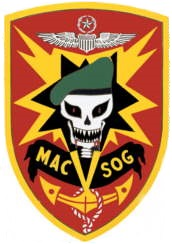
Military Assistance Command Vietnam - Studies and Observation Group, United States.

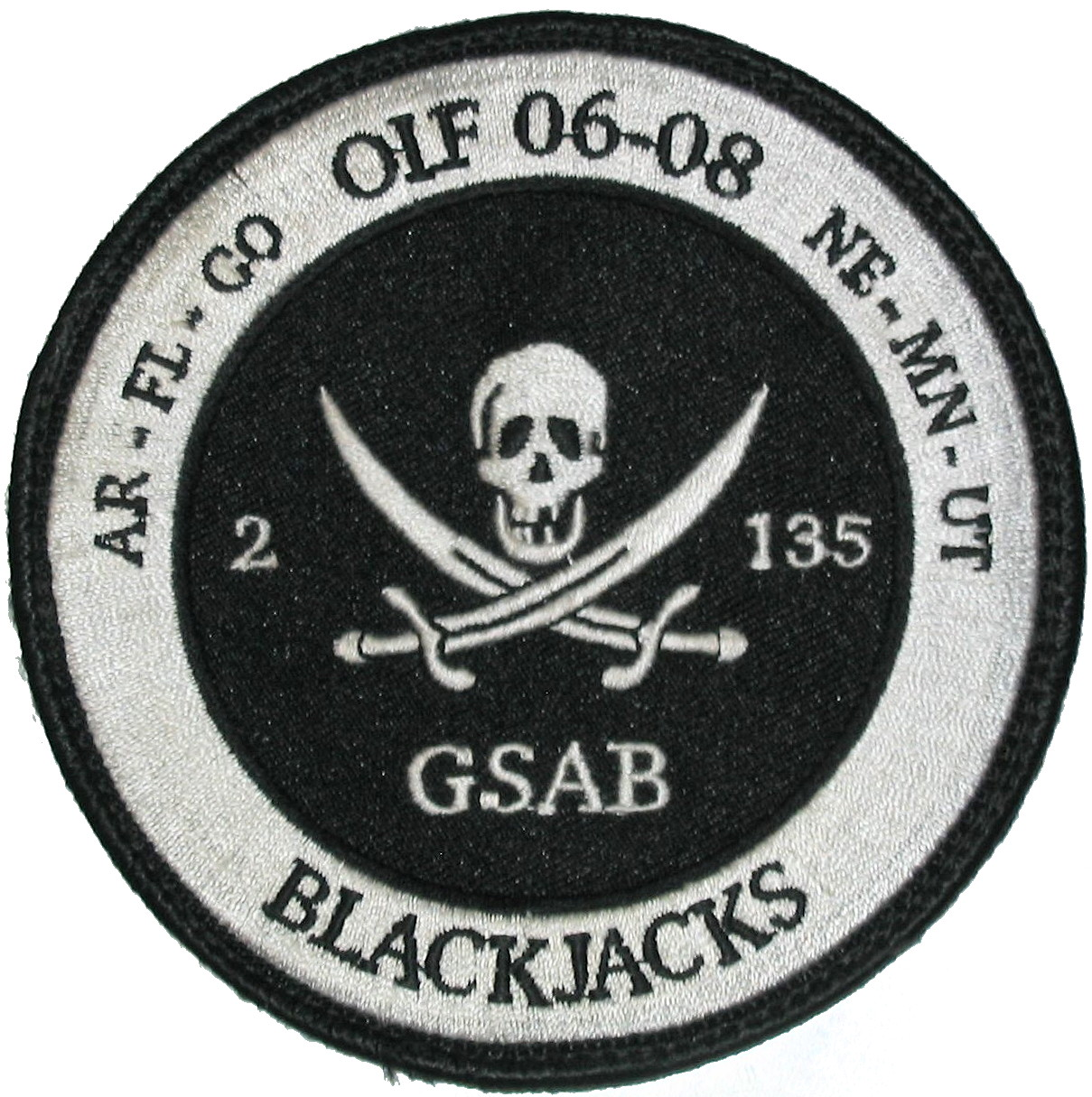
2nd Battalion, 135th Aviation Regiment, United States.

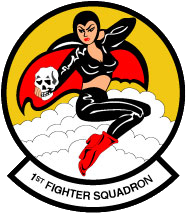
1st Fighter Squadron, United States.

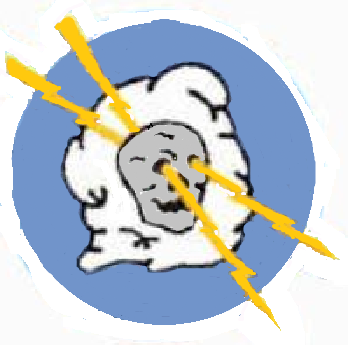
4th Fighter Squadron, United States.

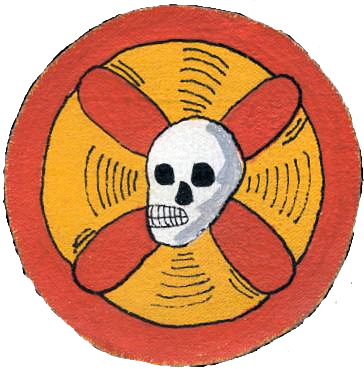
6th Night Fighter Squadron, United States.

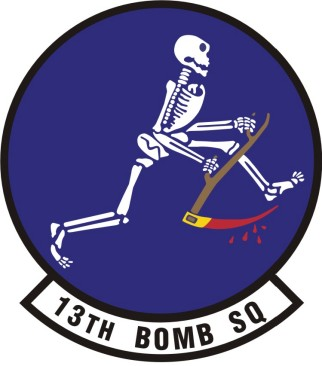
13th Bomb Squadron, USAF – inherited from 13th Aero Squadron.

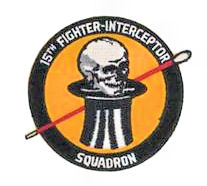
15th Fighter-Interceptor Squadron, United States.

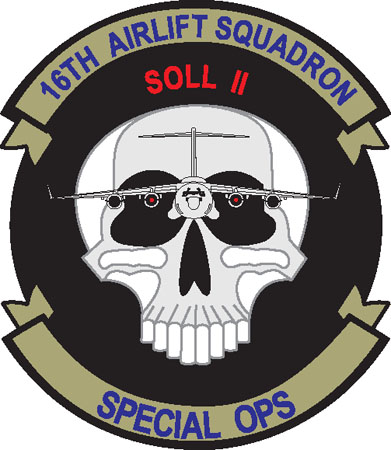
16th Airlift Squadron, United States.

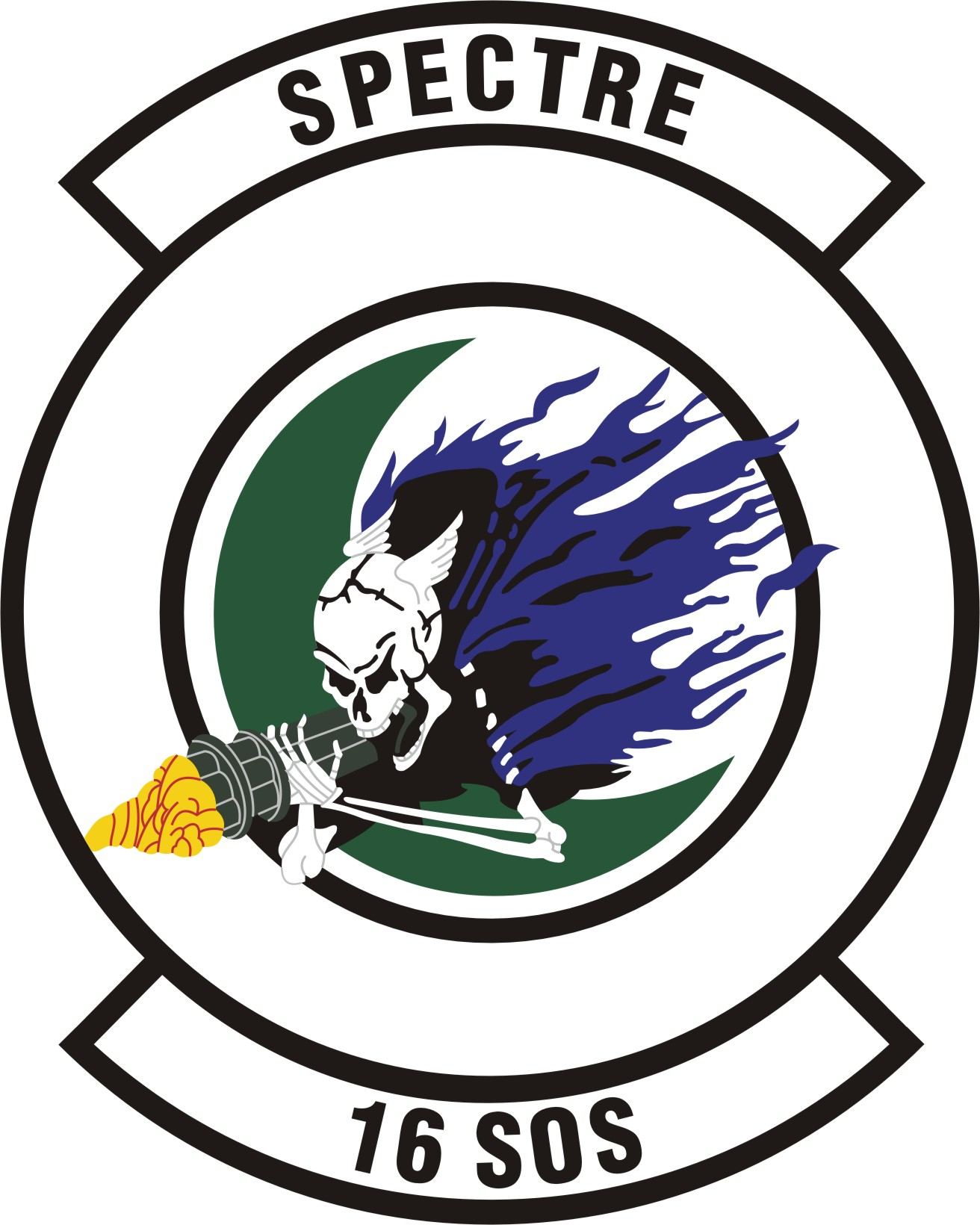
16th Special Operations Squadron, United States.

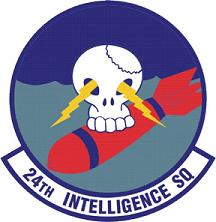
24th Intelligence Squadron, United States.

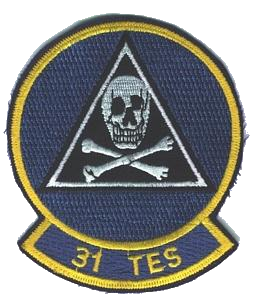
31st Test and Evaluation Squadron, United States.

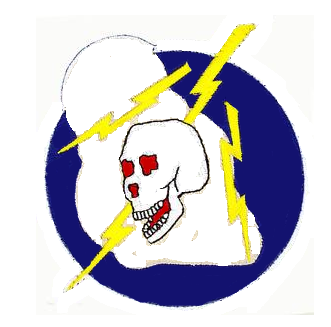
71st Fighter Squadron, United States.

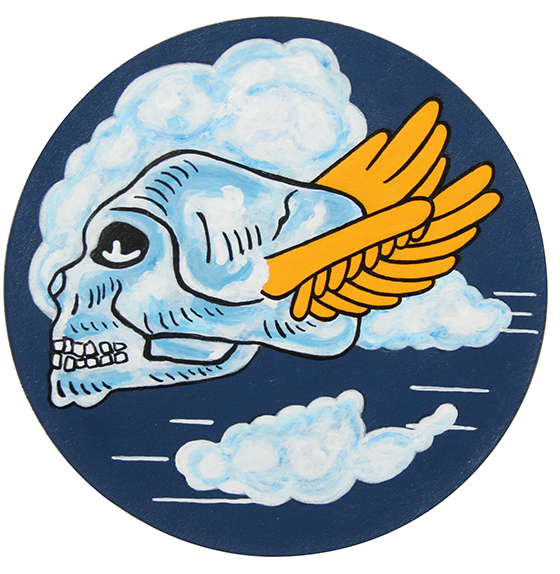
85th Fighter Squadron, United States.

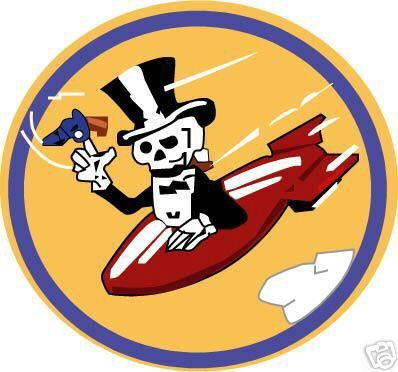
85th Bombardment Squadron, United States.

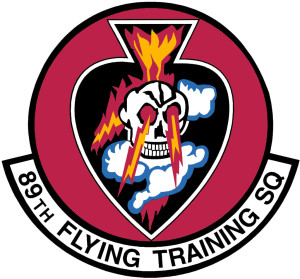
89th Flying Training Squadron, United States.

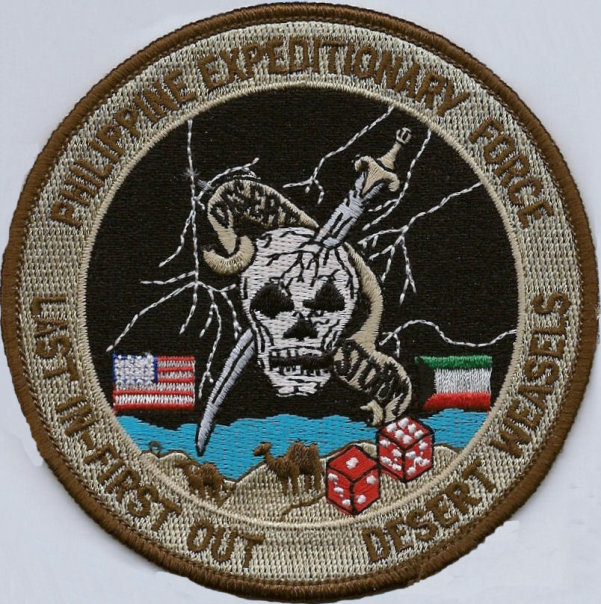
90th Tactical Fighter Squadron, United States.

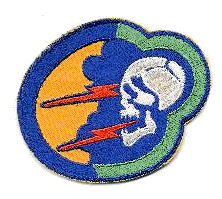
92nd Tactical Fighter Squadron, United States.

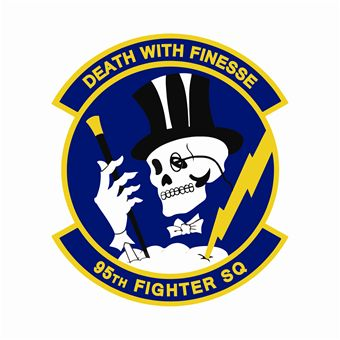
95th Fighter Squadron, United States.

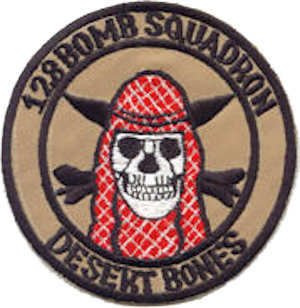
128th Bomb Squadron, United States.

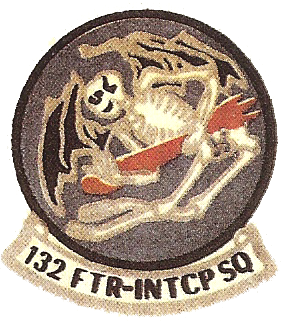
132nd Fighter-Interceptor Squadron, United States.

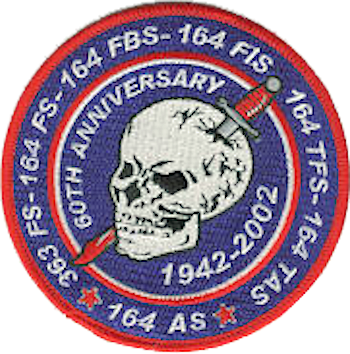
164th Airlift Squadron, United States.

190th Fighter Squadron, United States.

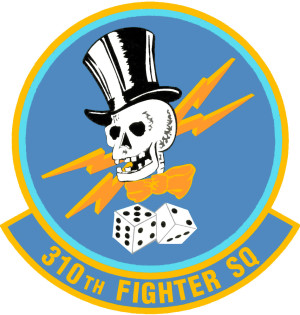
310th Fighter Squadron, United States.

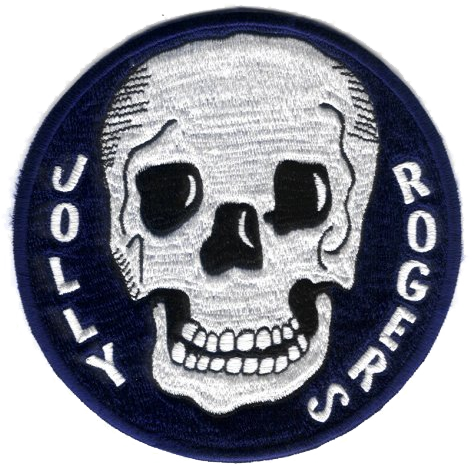
319th Bombardment Squadron, United States.

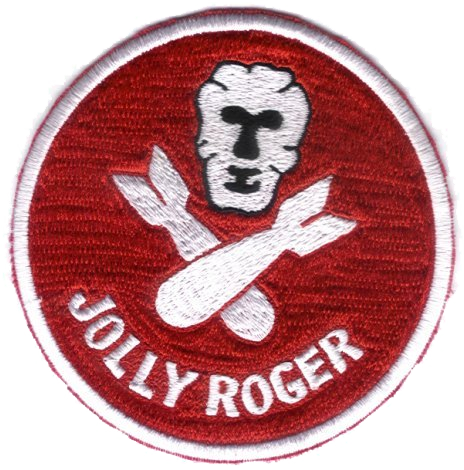
320th Bombardment Squadron, United States.

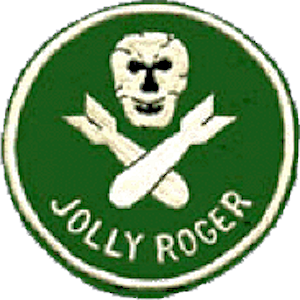
321st Bombardment Squadron, United States.

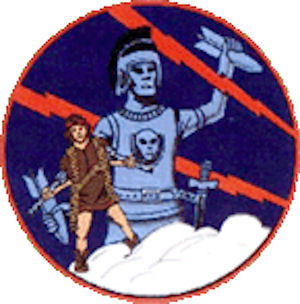
328th Fighter Squadron, United States.

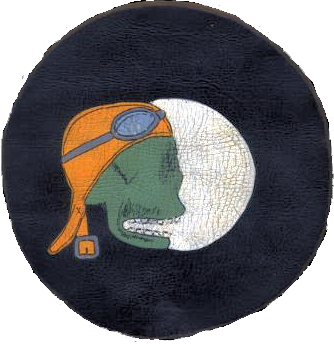
348th Night Fighter Squadron, United States.

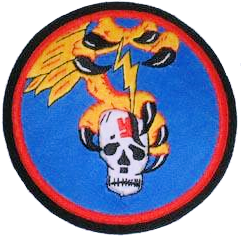
351st Fighter Squadron, United States.

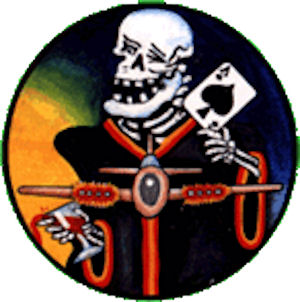
359th Fighter Squadron, United States.

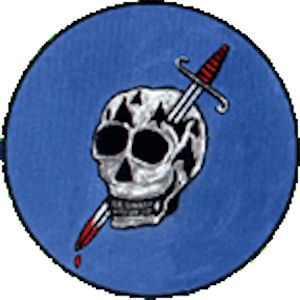
363rd Fighter Squadron, United States.

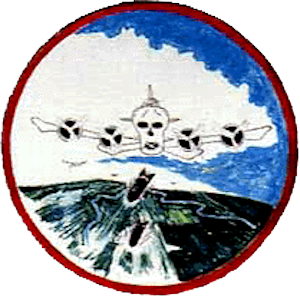
365th Bombardment Squadron, United States.

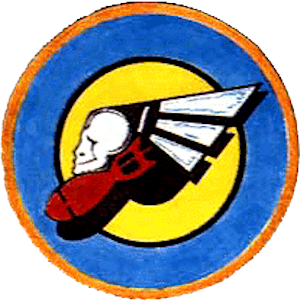
366th Bombardment Squadron, United States.

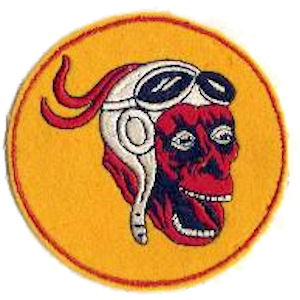
367th Bombardment Squadron, United States.

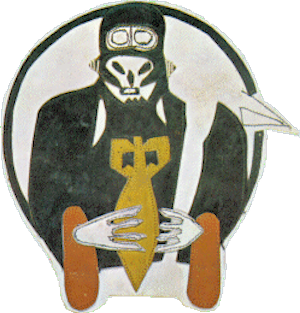
375th Bombardment Squadron, United States.

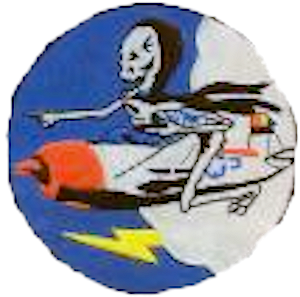
392nd Fighter Squadron, United States.

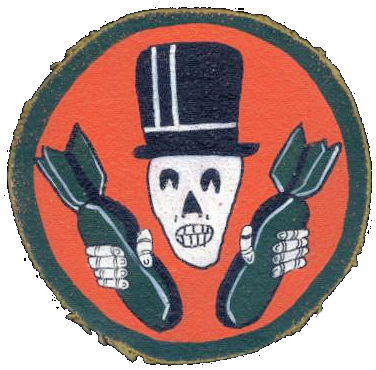
399th Bombardment Squadron, United States.

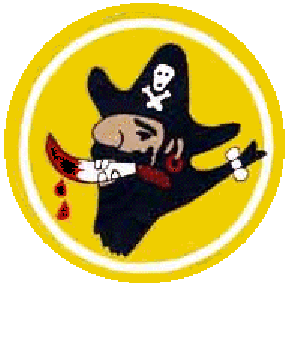
400th Bombardment Squadron, United States.

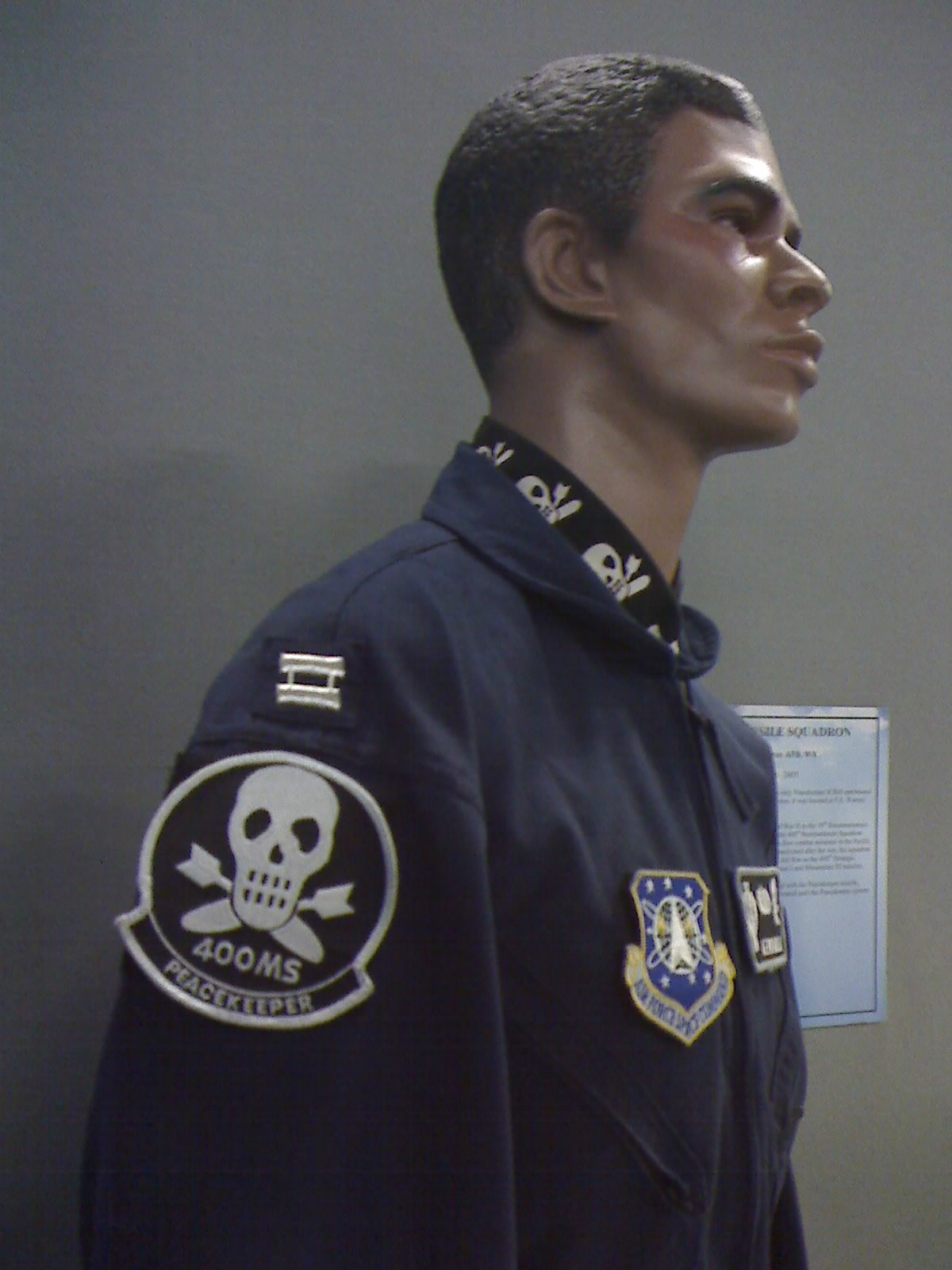
400th Missile Squadron, United States.

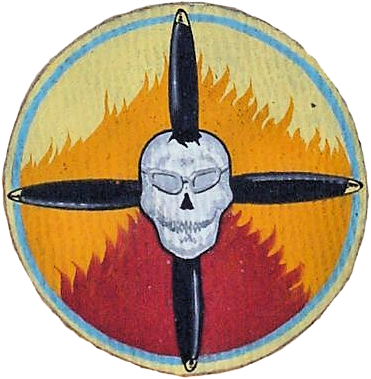
402nd Fighter Squadron, United States.

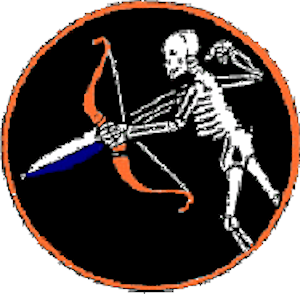
416th Bombardment Squadron, United States.

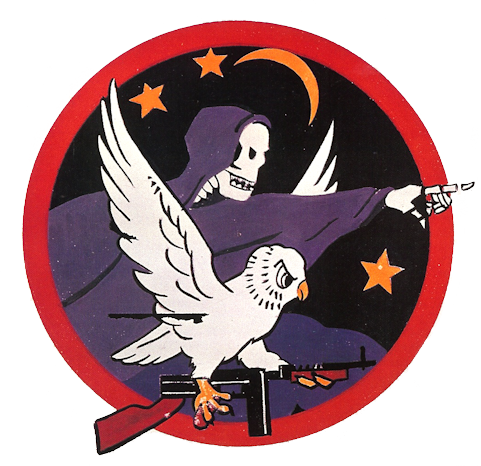
416th Night Fighter Squadron, United States

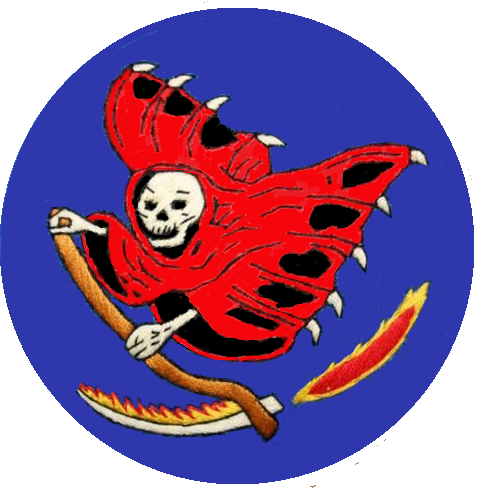
423rd Bombardment Squadron, United States.

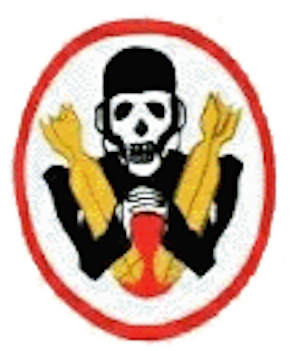
428th Bombardment Squadron, United States.

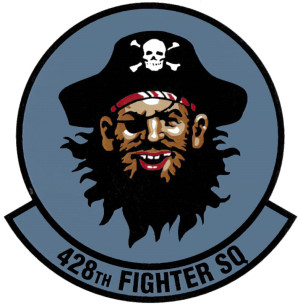
428th Fighter Squadron, United States.

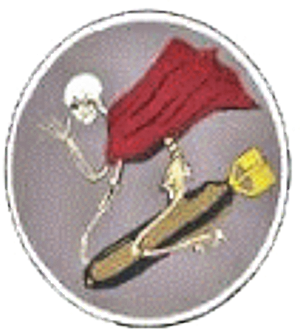
447th Bombardment Squadron, United States.

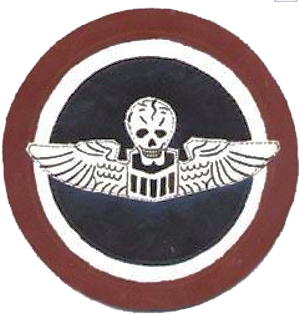
490th Bombardment Squadron, United States.

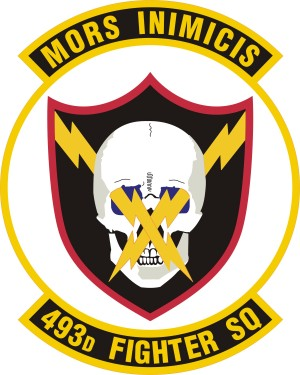
493rd Fighter Squadron, United States.

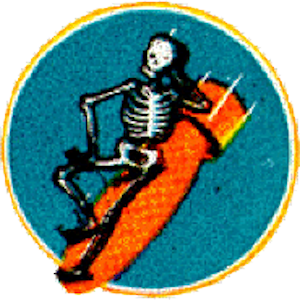
508th Fighter Squadron, United States.

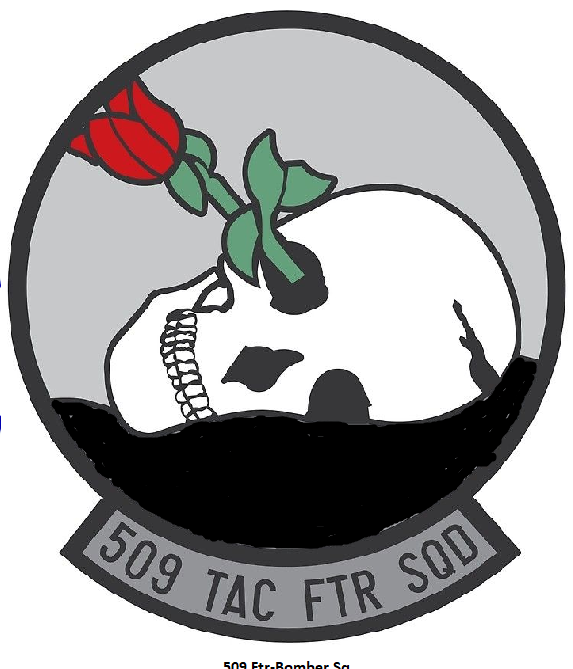
509th Tactical Fighter Squadron, United States.

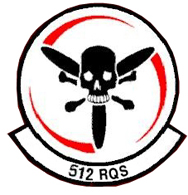
512th Rescue Squadron, United States.

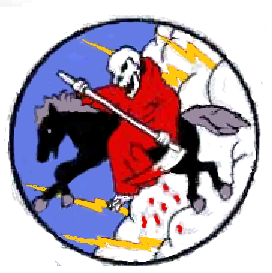
522nd Fighter-Bomber Squadron, United States.

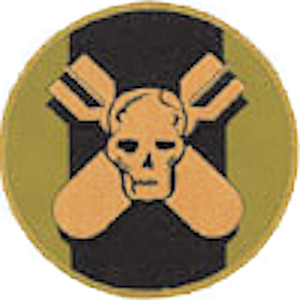
527th Bombardment Squadron, United States.

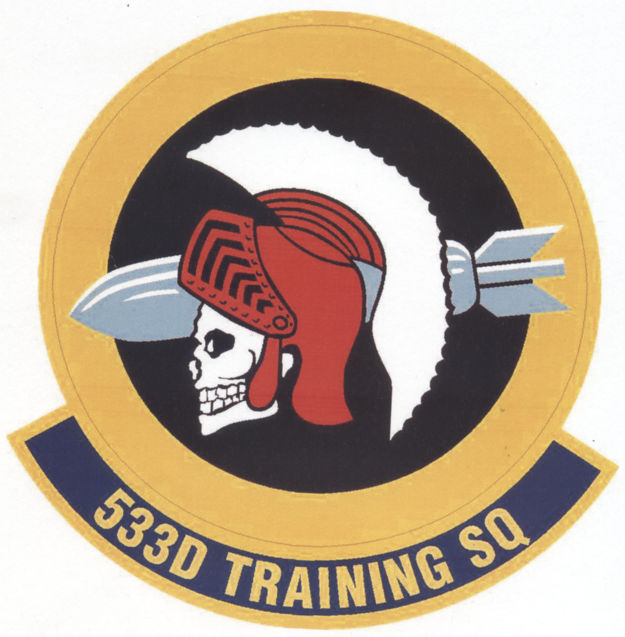
533rd Training Squadron, United States.

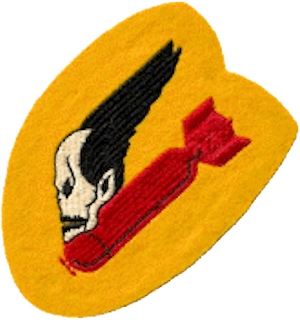
552nd Bombardment Squadron, United States.

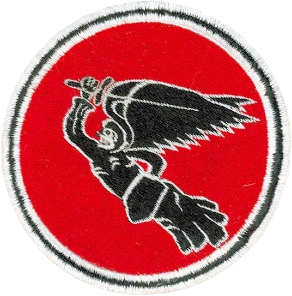
561st Fighter-Day Squadron, United States.

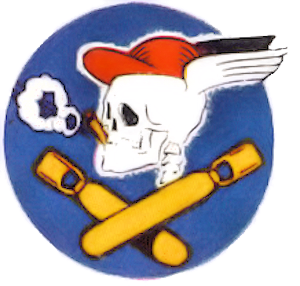
587th Bombardment Squadron, United States.

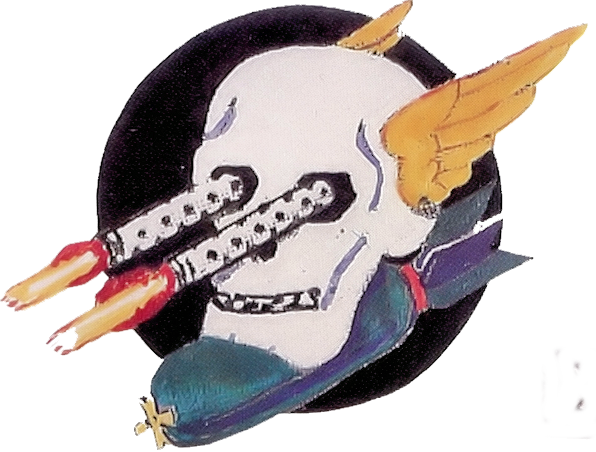
640th Bombardment Squadron, United States.

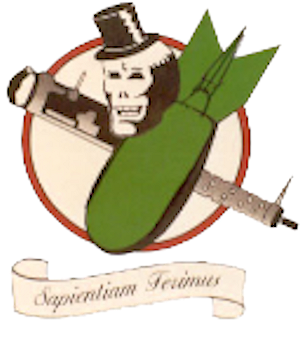
716th Bombardment Squadron, United States.

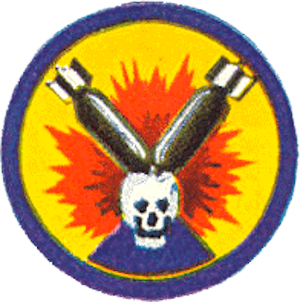
766th Bombardment Squadron, United States.

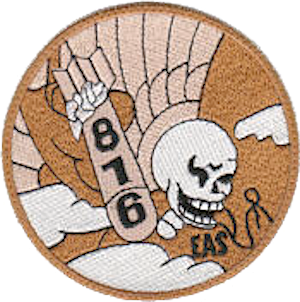
816th Expeditionary Airlift Squadron, United States.

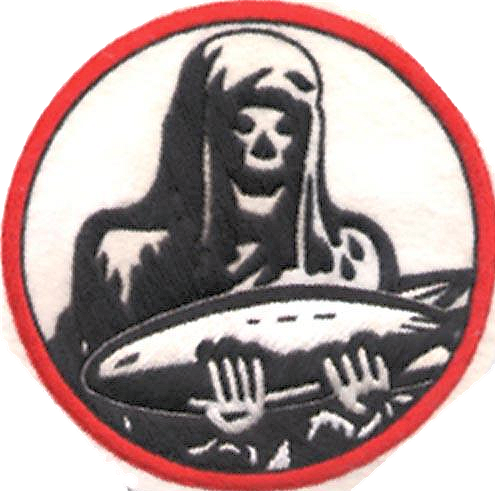
828th Bombardment Squadron, United States.

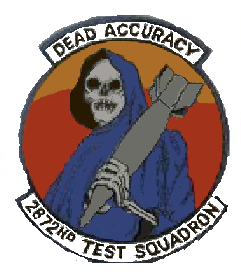
2872nd Test Squadron, United States.

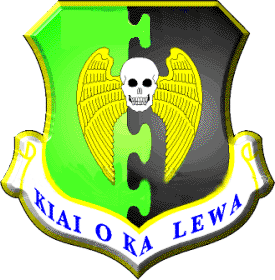
5th Bomb Wing, United States.

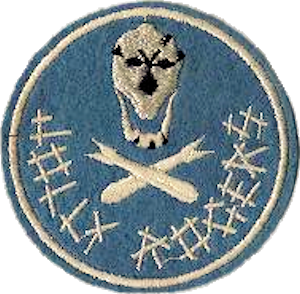
90th Bomb Group, United States.

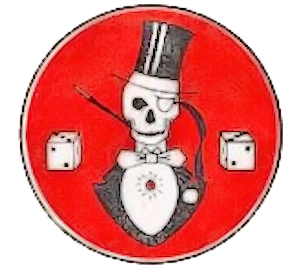
400th Bombardment Group, United States.

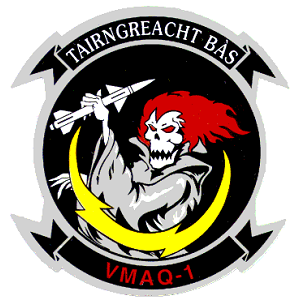
VMAQ-1, United States.

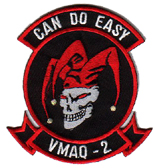
VMAQ-2, United States.

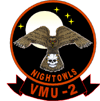
VMU-2, United States..

VFA-2, United States.

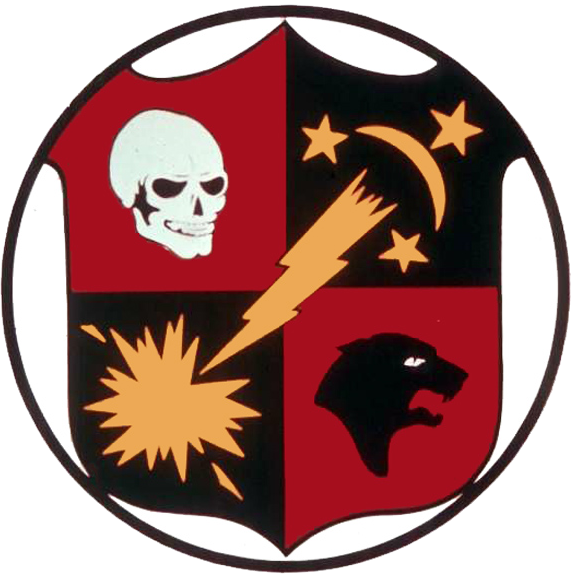
VFAW-3, United States.

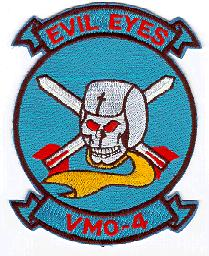
VMO-4, United States

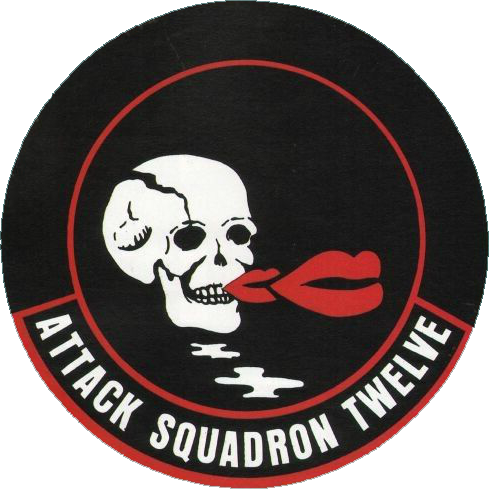
VA-12, United States.

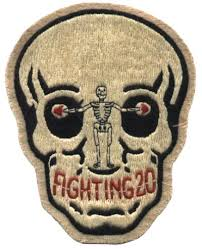
VF-20, United States.

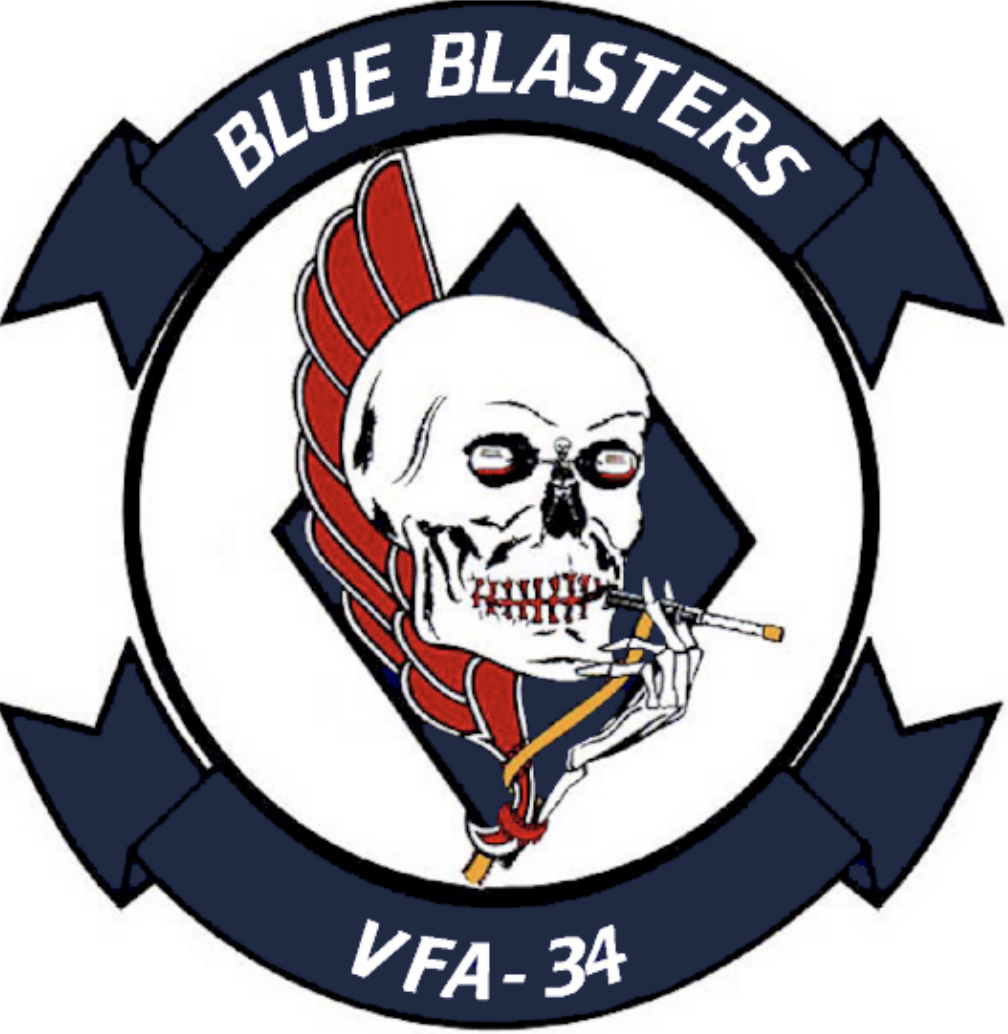
VFA-34, United States.

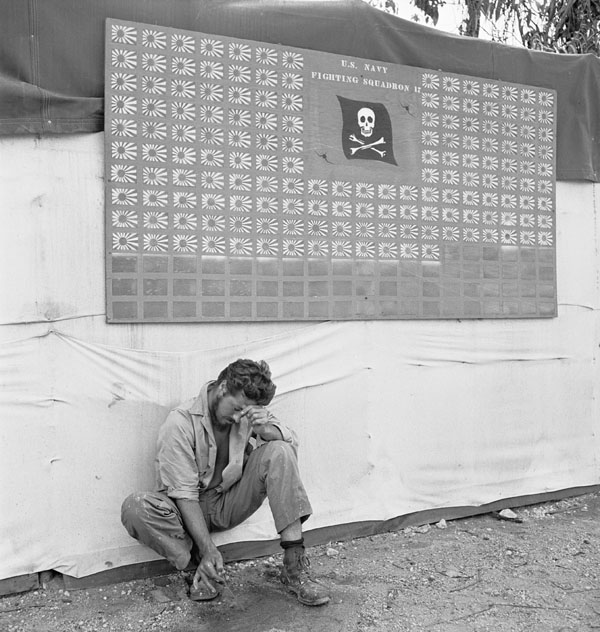
VF-61, United States.

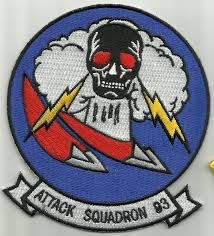
VA-93, United States.

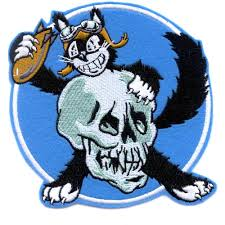
VA-94, United States.

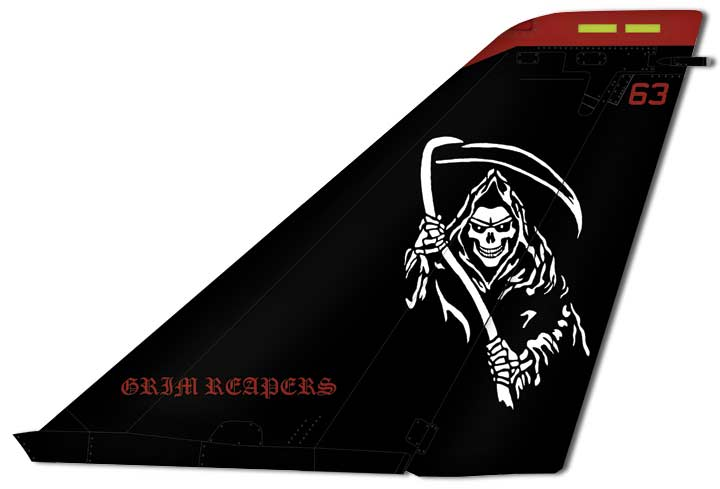
VF-101, United States.

VFA-103, United States.

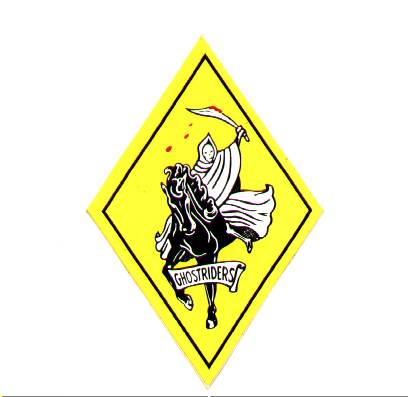
VF-142, United States.

VFA-151, United States.

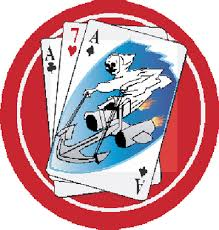
VF-171, United States.

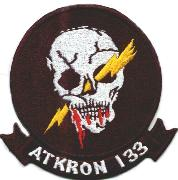
VA-133, United States.

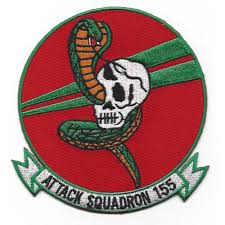
VA-155, United States.

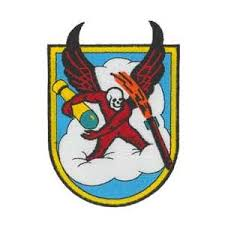
VA-175, United States.

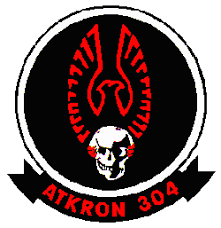
VA-304, United States.

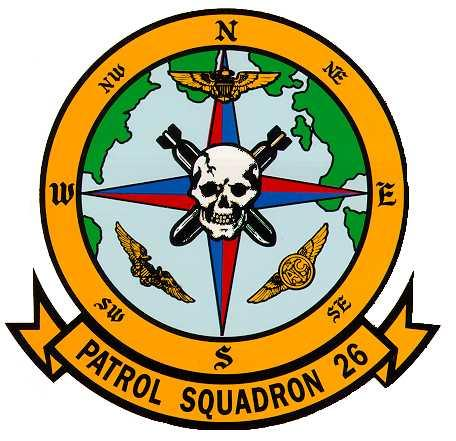
VP-26, United States.

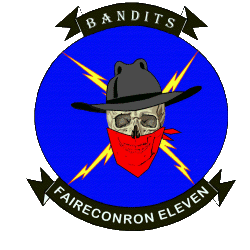
VQ-11, United States.

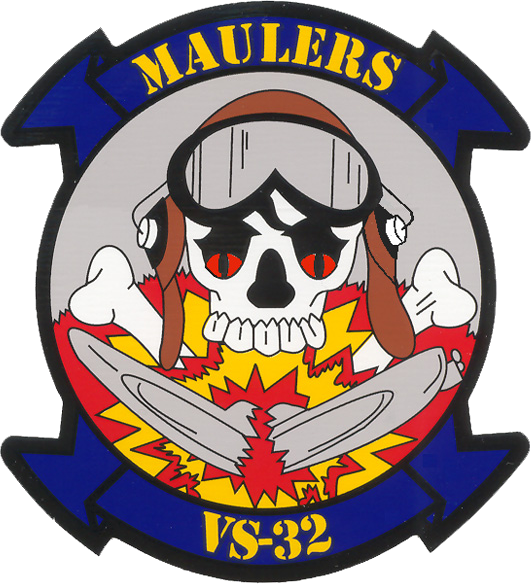
VS-32, United States.

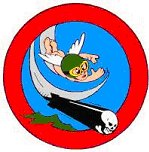
VT-11, United States.

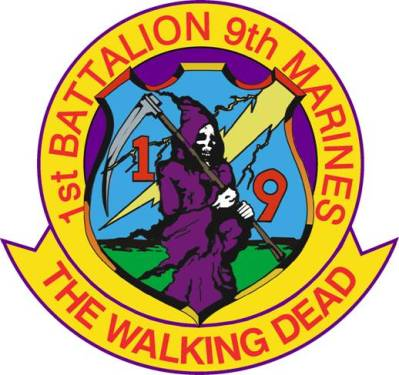
1st Battalion, 9th Marines, United States.

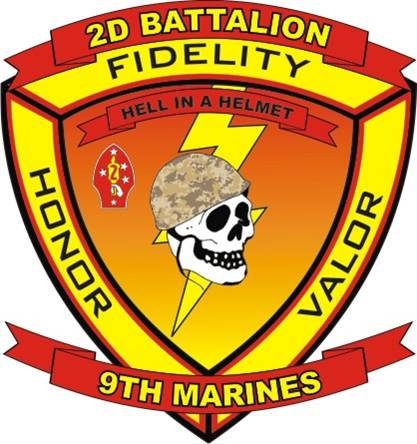
2nd Battalion, 9th Marines, United States.

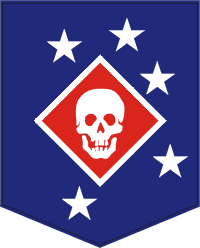
Marine Raider, United States.

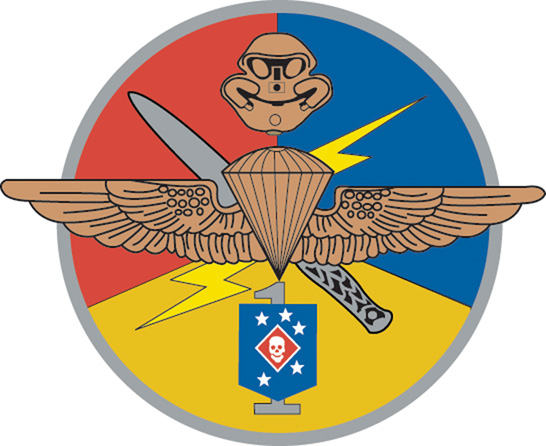
MCSOCOM, United States.

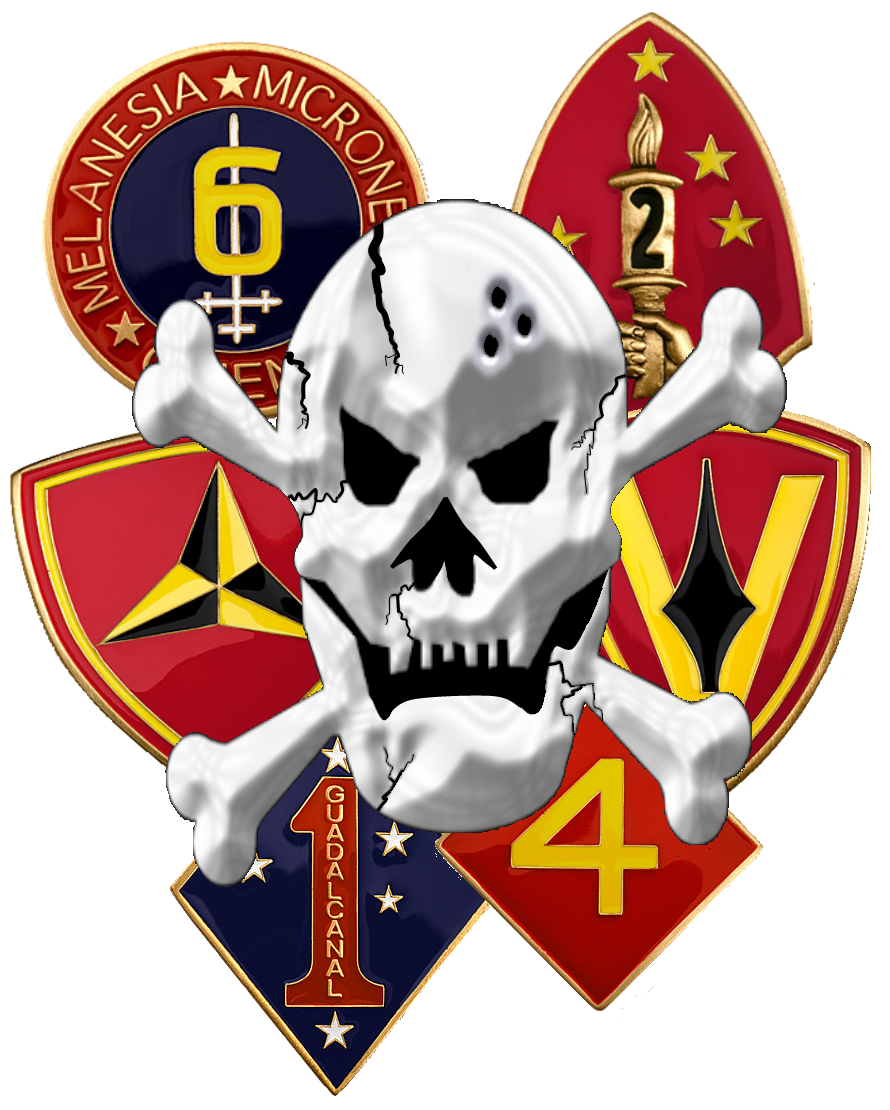
United States Marine Corps Reconnaissance Battalions, United States.

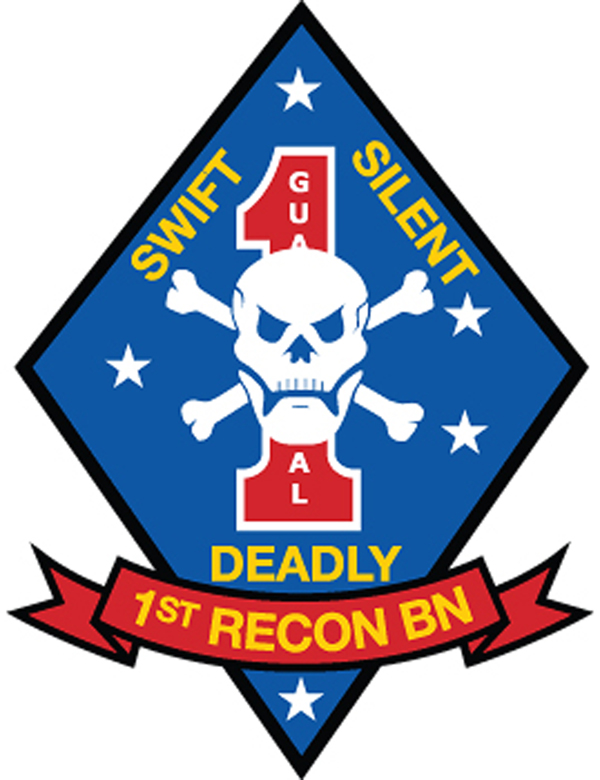
1st Reconnaissance Battalion, United States.

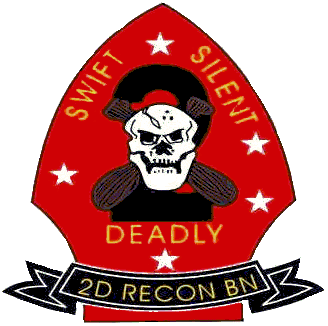
2nd Reconnaissance Battalion, United States.

3rd Reconnaissance Battalion, United States.

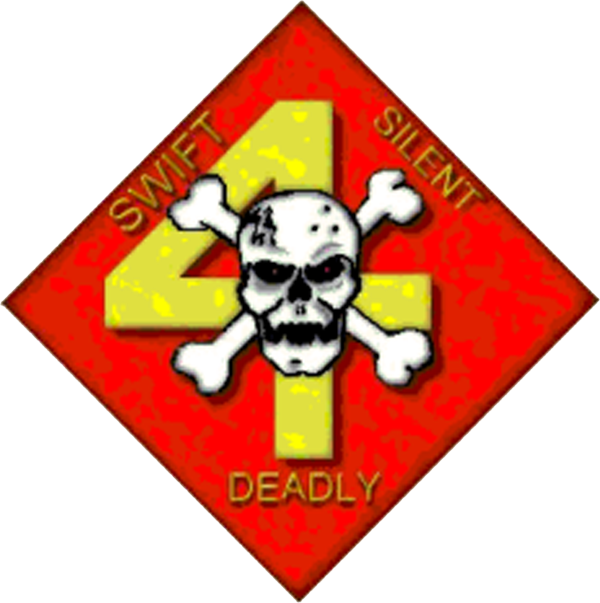
4th Reconnaissance Battalion, United States.

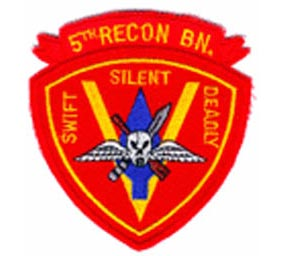
5th Reconnaissance Battalion, United States.

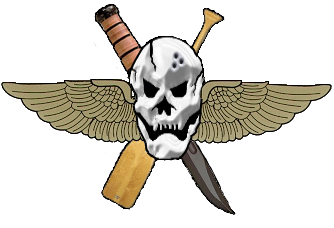
Marine Amphibious Reconnaissance, United States.

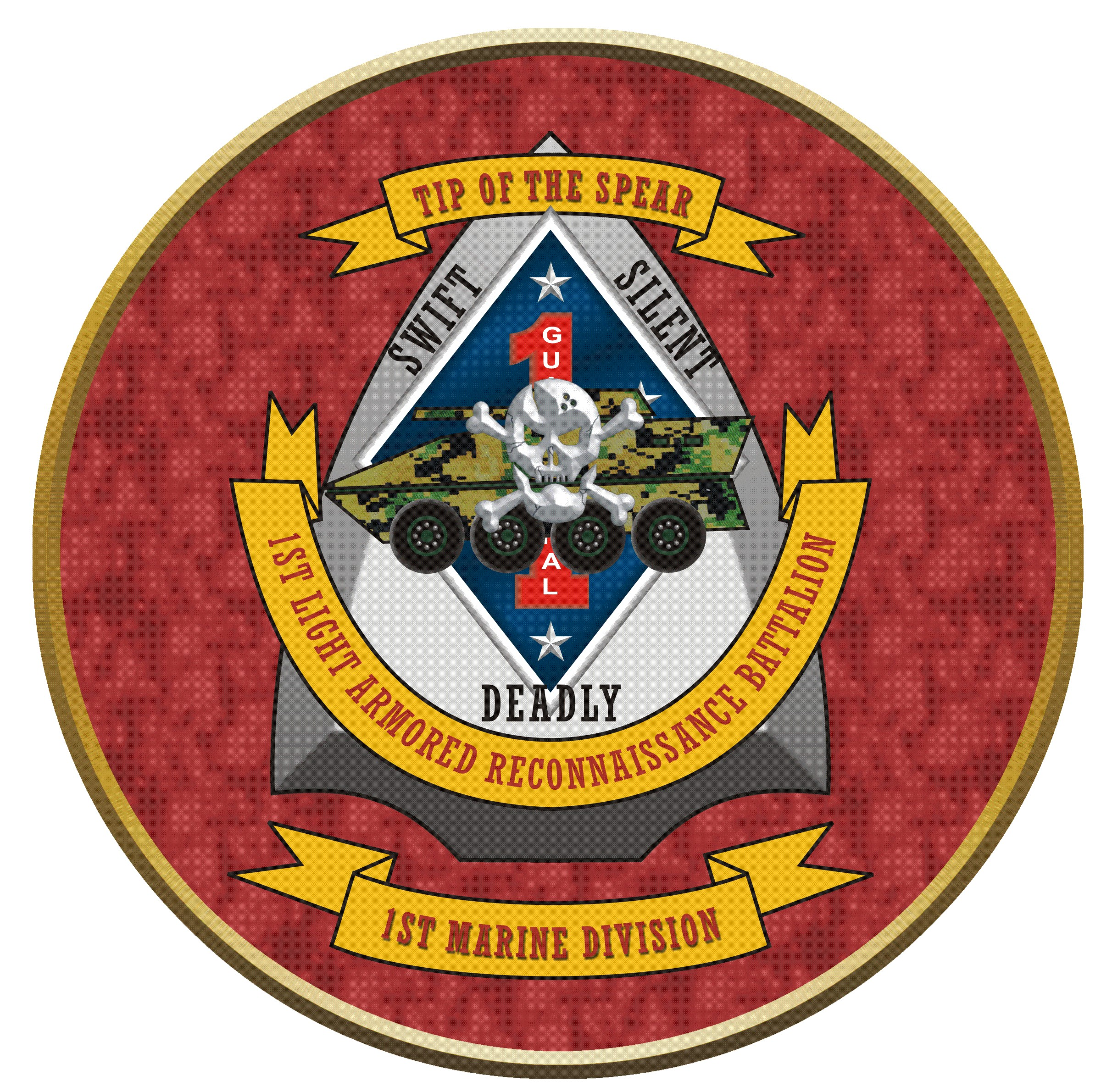
1st Light Armored Reconnaissance Battalion, United States.

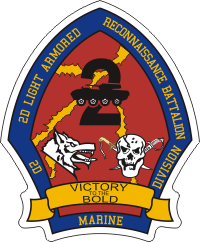
2nd Light Armored Reconnaissance Battalion, United States.

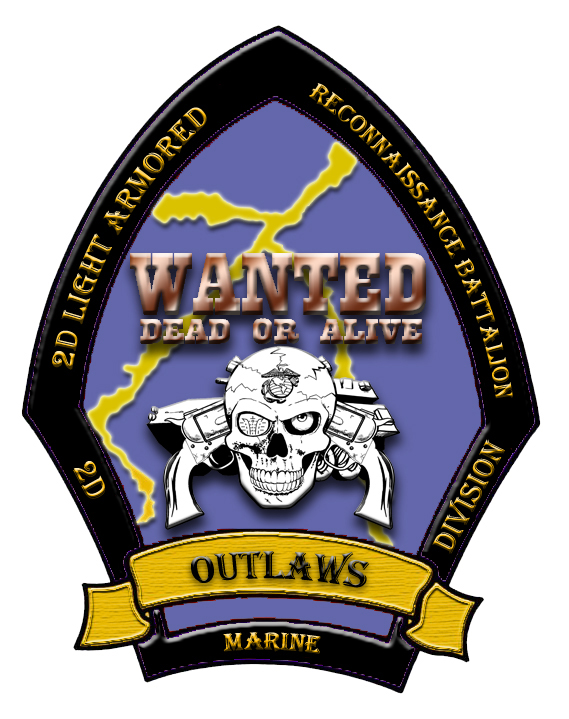
D Company, 2nd Light Armored Reconnaissance Battalion, United States.

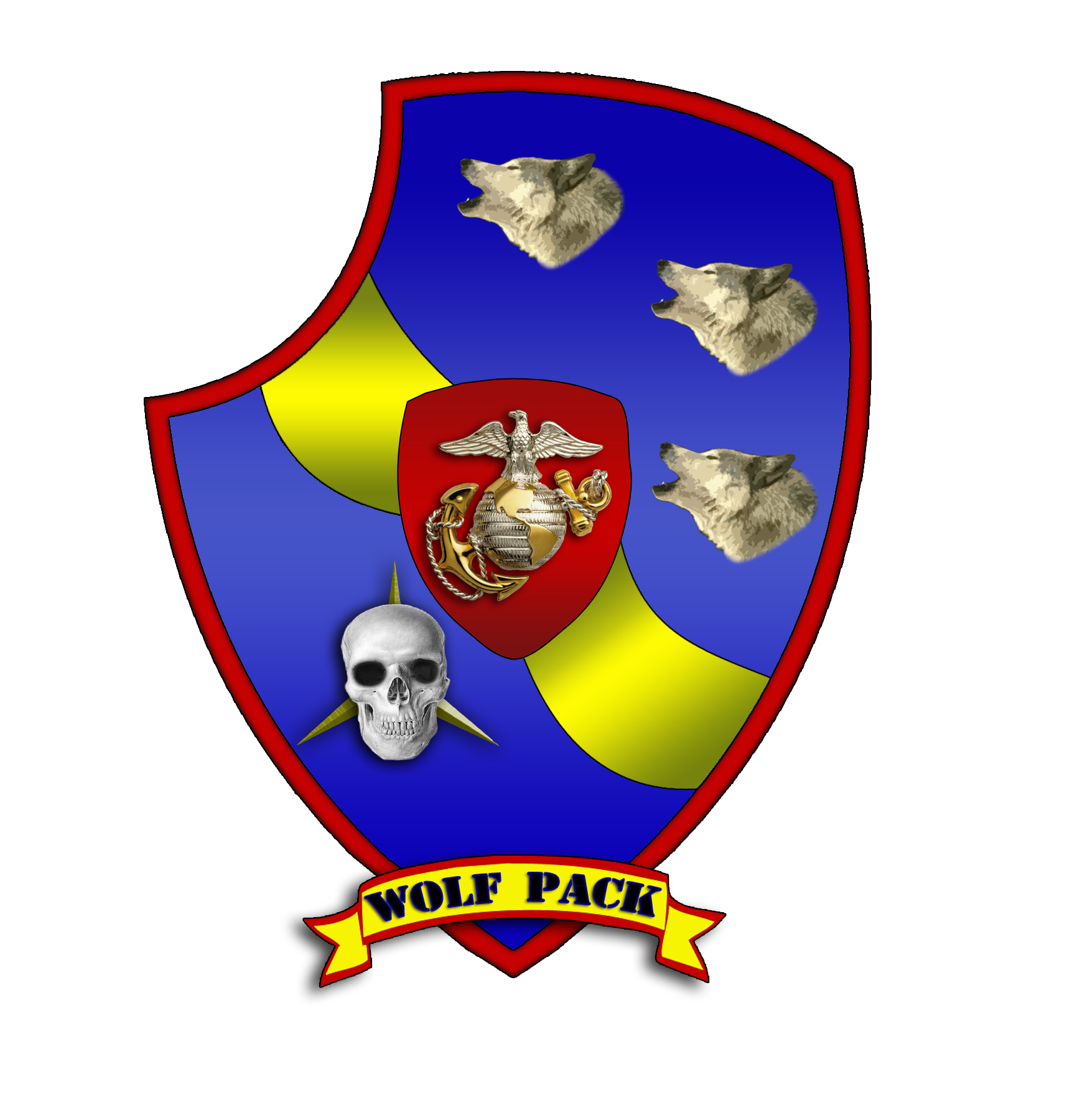
3rd Light Armored Reconnaissance Battalion, United States.

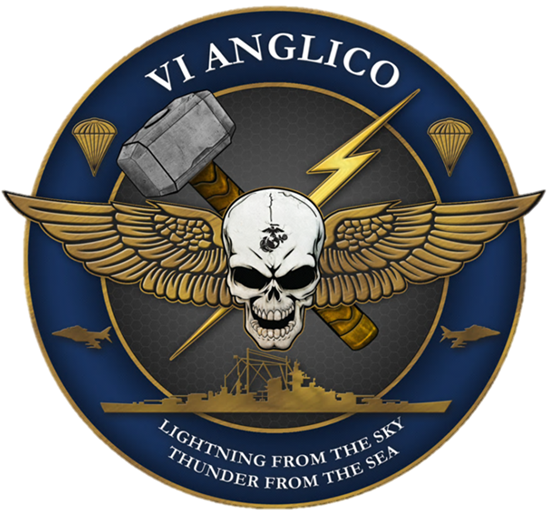
6th Air Naval Gunfire Liaison Company, United States.

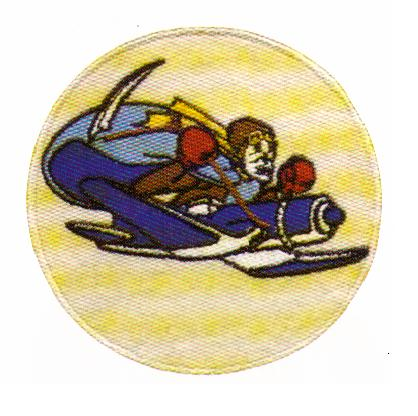
VMF-113, United States.

VMF(AW)-114, United States.

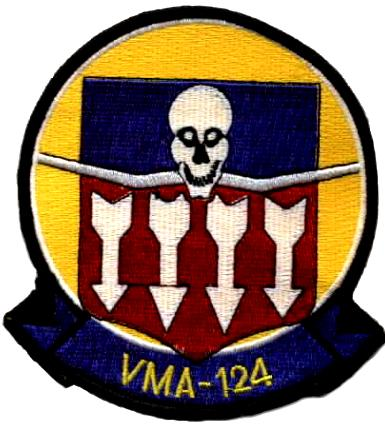
VMA-124, United States.

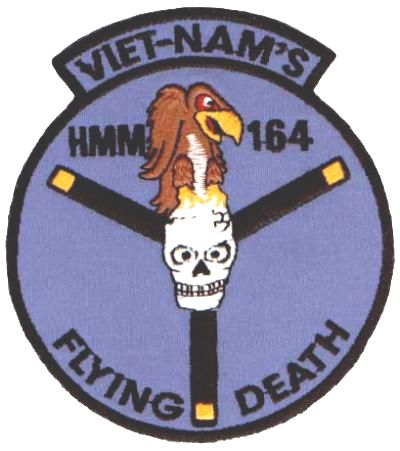
HMM-164, United States.

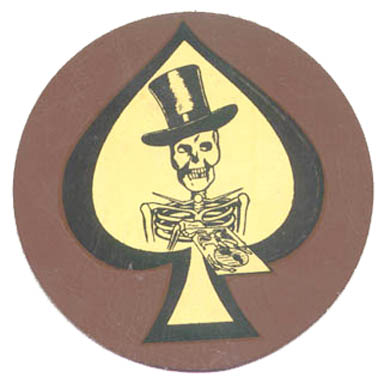
VMF-225, United States.

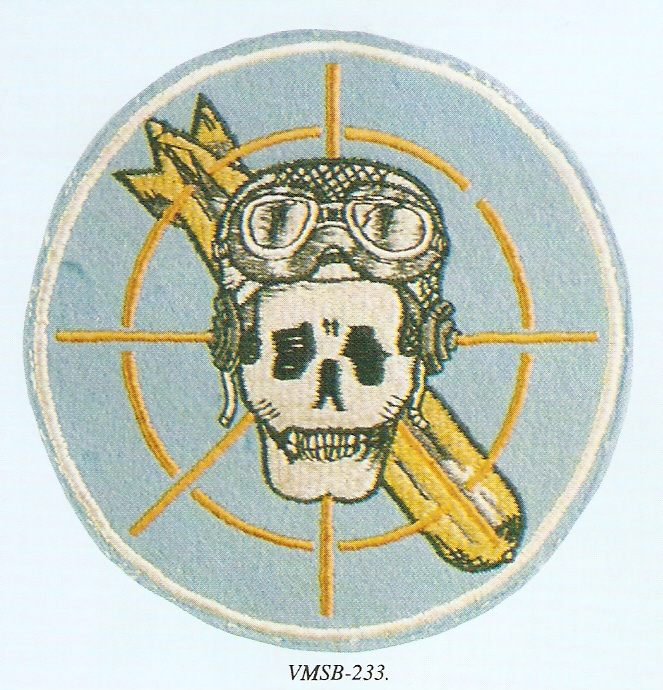
VMSB-233, United States.

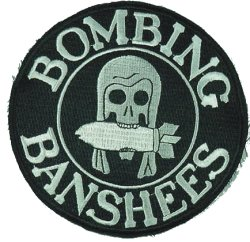
VMSB-244, United States.

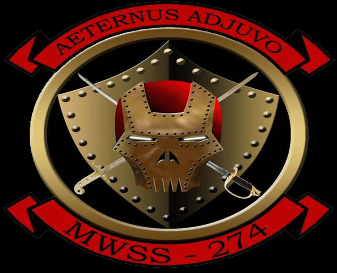
MWSS-274

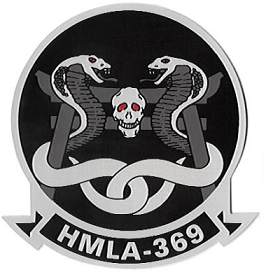
HMLA-369, United States.

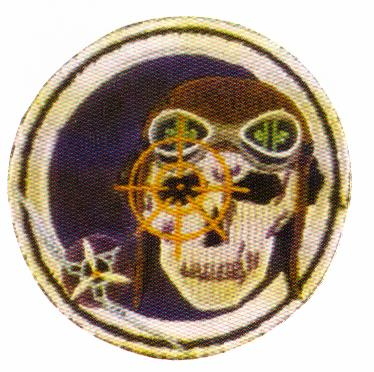
VMF-471, United States.

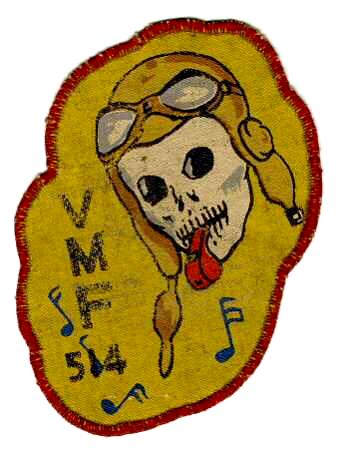
VMF-514, United States.

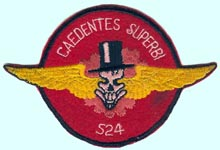
VMF-524, United States.

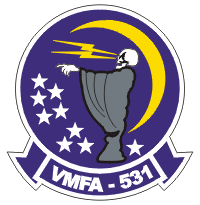
VMFA-531, United States.

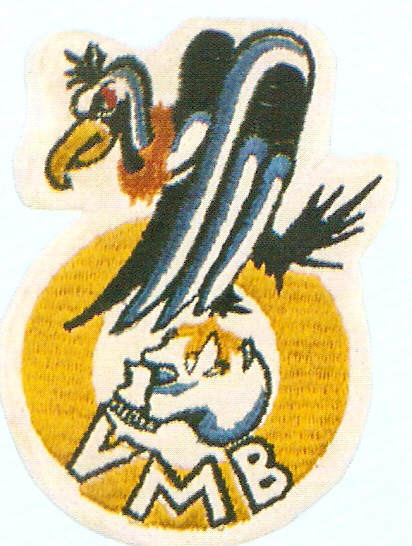
VMTB-621, United States.

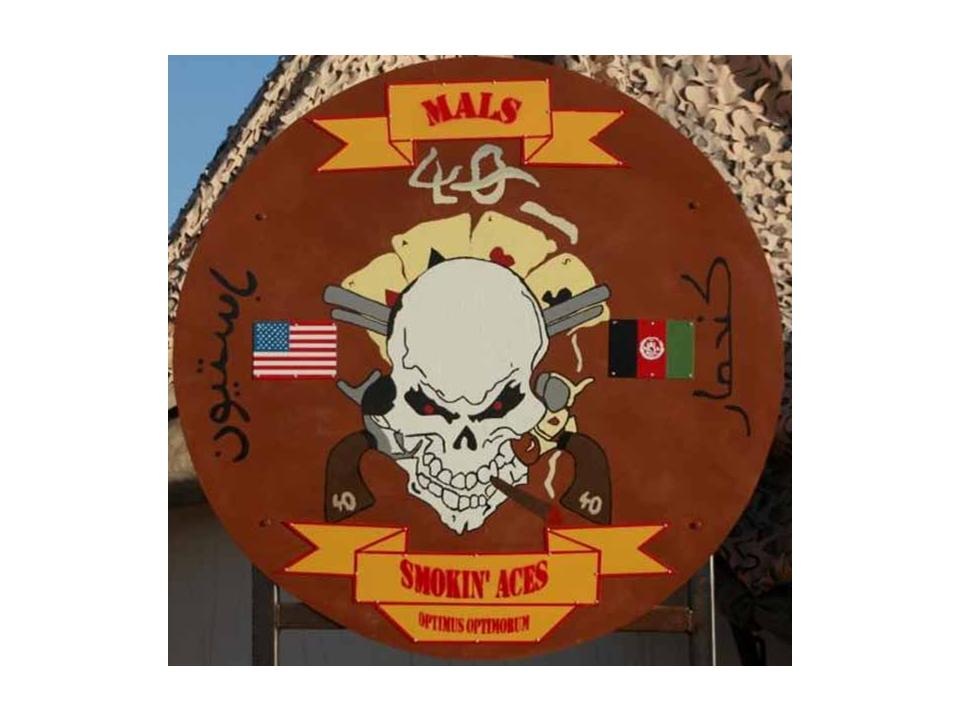
MALS-40, United States.

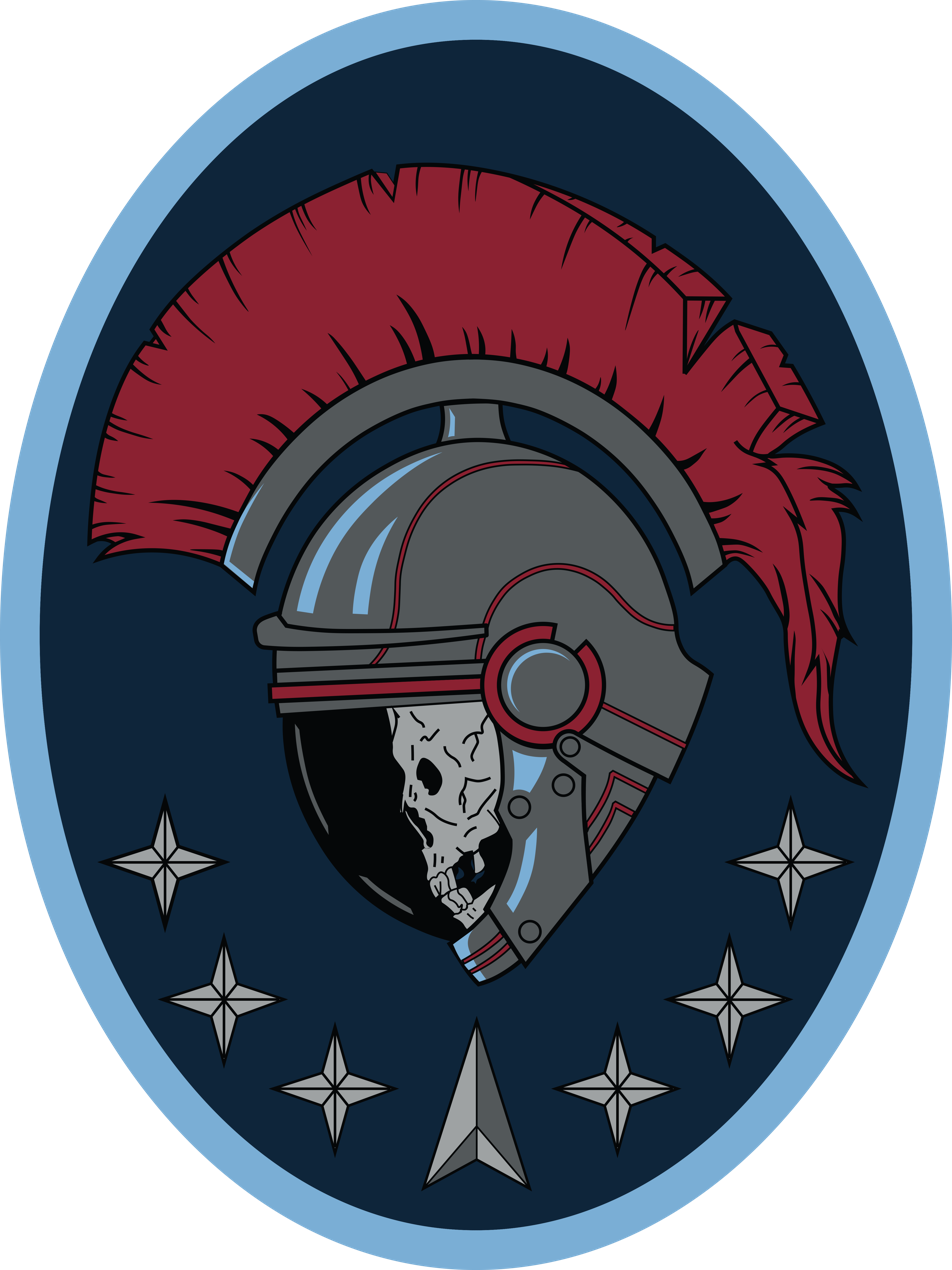
533rd Training Squadron, United States.

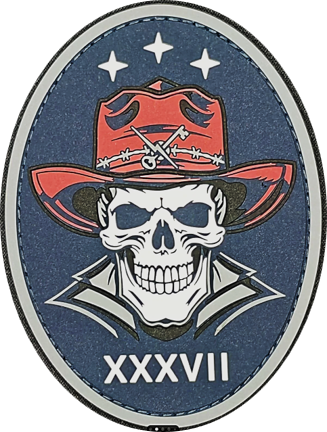
37th Tactical Intelligence Squadron, United States.

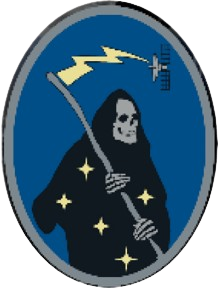
Joint Fires and Information Operations Team, United States.

== See also ==
- No. 100 Squadron RAF
- 101 Squadron (Israel)
- Danse Macabre
- Totenkopf
- Punisher skull
