= Deadhead (disambiguation) =

A Deadhead or Dead head is a fan of the American jam band the Grateful Dead. Without capitalization, the term has other meanings in use since the 19th century.

Deadhead or Dead Head may also refer to:

== Film and television ==
- Dead Head (TV series), a British TV drama
- Deadheads (film), a 2011 zombie comedy
- Deadhead, a character in the Beach Party films
- the title character of Sergeant Deadhead, a 1965 American musical comedy film

== Music ==
- Dead Head (band), a Dutch thrash metal band
- Deadhead, an American rock band side project featuring Jeremy Bolm
- "Deadhead", a song by the Stereophonics from the 2005 album Language. Sex. Violence. Other?
- "Deadhead", a song by The Devin Townsend Band on the 2003 album Accelerated Evolution

== Other uses ==
- Deadheading (disambiguation), several uses
- Snag, or deadhead, a partially-submerged tree or branch that poses a hazard to boat navigation
- Deadheads, a 1983 English crime novel by Reginald Hill

== See also ==
- Death's Head
