= Symbols of death =

Symbols of death are the motifs, images and concepts associated with death throughout different cultures, religions and societies.

== Images ==
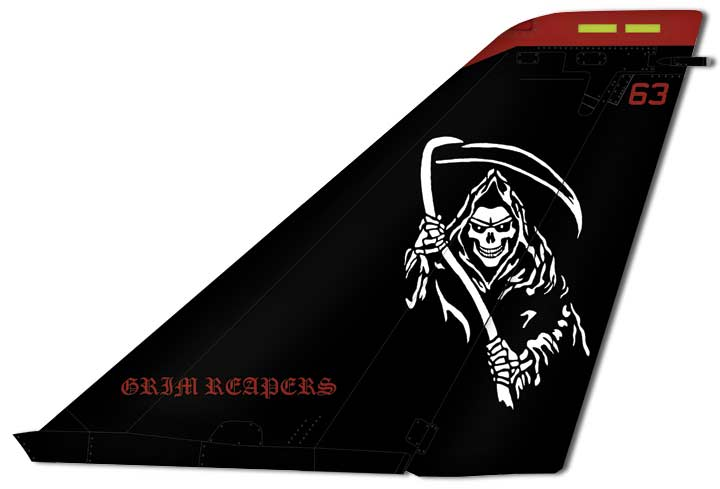
Image of the Grim Reaper on the tailfin of a U.S. Navy F-14D Tomcat of Flight Squadron, VF-101, nicknamed the "Grim Reapers."

Traditional Jolly Roger, the flag of Samuel Bellamy and other pirates of the 18th century, displaying a skull and crossbones.

Various images are used traditionally to symbolize death; these rank from blunt depictions of cadavers and their parts to more allusive suggestions that time is fleeting and all men are mortals.

The human skull is an obvious and frequent symbol of death, found in many cultures and religious traditions. Human skeletons and sometimes non-human animal skeletons and skulls can also be used as blunt images of death; the traditional figure of the Grim Reaper – a black-hooded skeleton with a scythe – is one use of such symbolism. Within the Grim Reaper itself, the skeleton represents the decayed body whereas the robe symbolizes those worn by religious people conducting funeral services. The skull and crossbones motif (☠) has been used among Europeans as a symbol of both piracy and poison. The skull is also important as it remains the only "recognizable" aspect of a person once they have died.

Decayed cadavers can also be used to depict death; in medieval Europe, they were often featured in artistic depictions of the danse macabre, or in cadaver tombs which depicted the living and decomposed body of the person entombed. Coffins also serve as blunt reminders of mortality. Europeans were also seen to use coffins and cemeteries to symbolize the wealth and status of the person who has died, serving as a reminder to the living and the deceased as well. Less blunt symbols of death frequently allude to the passage of time and the fragility of life, and can be described as memento mori; that is, an artistic or symbolic reminder of the inevitability of death. Clocks, hourglasses, sundials, and other timepieces both call to mind that time is passing. Similarly, a candle both marks the passage of time, and bears witness that it will eventually burn itself out as well as a symbol of hope of salvation. These sorts of symbols were often incorporated into vanitas paintings, a variety of early still life.

== Animals ==
Throughout history and across many cultures, some animals have come to symbolize death and dying. This symbolism is often demonstrated in the legends and folklore of the culture. The specific animals and the details of their symbolism vary widely from culture to culture. However, some animals tend to appear more frequently than others; such as dogs, bats, owls and crows.

Several societies associate a type of dog with death. Dogs often serve as companions or guides to humans. Unsurprisingly, these animals that are so much a part of human life would have a role in death as well. In Mexico, the Xoloitzcuintli, a hairless dog, is thought to guide the spirits of the deceased and are associated with Día de Los Muertos. In Greece, Cerberus is a three-headed dog which guards the entrance to the underworld. In Welsh mythology, there is also a dog that guards the underworld. In England, the black dog, black shuck, is associated with death or misfortune.

Bats, as nocturnal animals, are often associated with darkness and death. In Christianity, bats are considered to be the bird of the devil and connections between the physiology of bats and demons are made. In New Zealand, bats are associated with the Hokioi, a mythical nocturnal bird that foretells death. The discovery of the vampire bats in North America and the exaggeration of their qualities made lasting associations between bats and death that eventually lead to Dracula and vampire stories. Bats are often connected to both Halloween and witches.

Owls, another nocturnal animal, are also tied to death. Some Mediterranean folklore tells of women who turn into owls at night to suck the breath away from babies. The hoot of an owl, according to Roman mythology, is said to be an omen of imminent death or demise. It is said that the sound of an owl was heard shortly before the death of several Roman emperors. Sri Lankan folklore tells of an owl-like creature whose human sounding shrieks are heard across the jungle at night. Like in Roman mythology, they are said to foretell of death.

Another common animal found to symbolize death across many cultures is the crow. Crows are scavenging birds. This might explain why so many cultures have associated them with death as they were often seen near dead bodies. Irish folklore tells of Badb, one of a trio of war goddesses, took the form of a crow. Badb is said to foreshadow bloodshed. Traditional Swedish folklore says that crows are the ghost of those who did not receive a proper burial. Some literature uses crows circling in the air above a specific place to foretell the death in that area. All over the world crows are commonly associated with death; a group of crows is called a murder.

== Religious symbols ==
Veve of Maman Brigitte, the loa of death in Haitian Vodou.

Religious symbols of death and depictions of the afterlife will vary with the religion practiced by the people who use them.

Tombs, tombstones, and other items of funeral architecture are obvious candidates for symbols of death. In ancient Egypt, the gods Osiris and Ptah were typically depicted as mummies; these gods governed the Egyptian afterlife. In Christianity, the Christian cross is frequently used on graves, and is meant to call to mind the crucifixion of Jesus. Some Christians also erect temporary crosses along public highways as memorials for those who died in accidents. In Buddhism, the symbol of a wheel represents the perpetual cycle of death and rebirth that happens in samsara. The symbol of a grave or tomb, especially one in a picturesque or unusual location, can be used to represent death, as in Nicolas Poussin's famous painting Et in Arcadia ego.

Images of life in the afterlife are also symbols of death. Here, again, the ancient Egyptians produced detailed pictorial representations of the life enjoyed by the dead. In Christian folk religion, the spirits of the dead are often depicted as winged angels or angel-like creatures, dwelling among the clouds; this imagery of the afterlife is frequently used in comic depictions of life after death. In the Islamic view of the Afterlife, death is symbolised by a black and white ram which in turn will be slain to symbolise the Death of Death.

The Banshee also symbolizes the coming of death in Irish Mythology. This is typically represented by an older woman who is seen sobbing to symbolize the suffering of a person before their death.

== Colours ==
Black is the color of mourning in many European cultures. Black clothing is typically worn at funerals to show mourning for the death of the person. In East Asia, white is similarly associated with mourning; it represents the purity and perfection of the deceased person's spirit. Hindus similarly also wear white during mourning and funerals. During the Victorian era, purple and grey were considered to be mourning colors in addition to black. Furthermore, in Revelation 6 in The Bible, Death is one of the four horsemen; and he rides a pale horse.

== See also ==
- Dagger (mark) – Typographical symbol (†)
- Death's head (disambiguation)
- Human skull symbolism – Attachment of symbolic meaning
- Skull and crossbones (disambiguation)
- Solar symbol – Symbol representing the Sun
- Symbol – Something that represents an idea, process, or physical entity
- Theta nigrum – Symbol of death
- Totenkopf – German symbol for skull and crossbones
- † – Killed in Action – Classification of military personnel casualties
