= Human skull symbolism =

Attachment of symbolic meaning

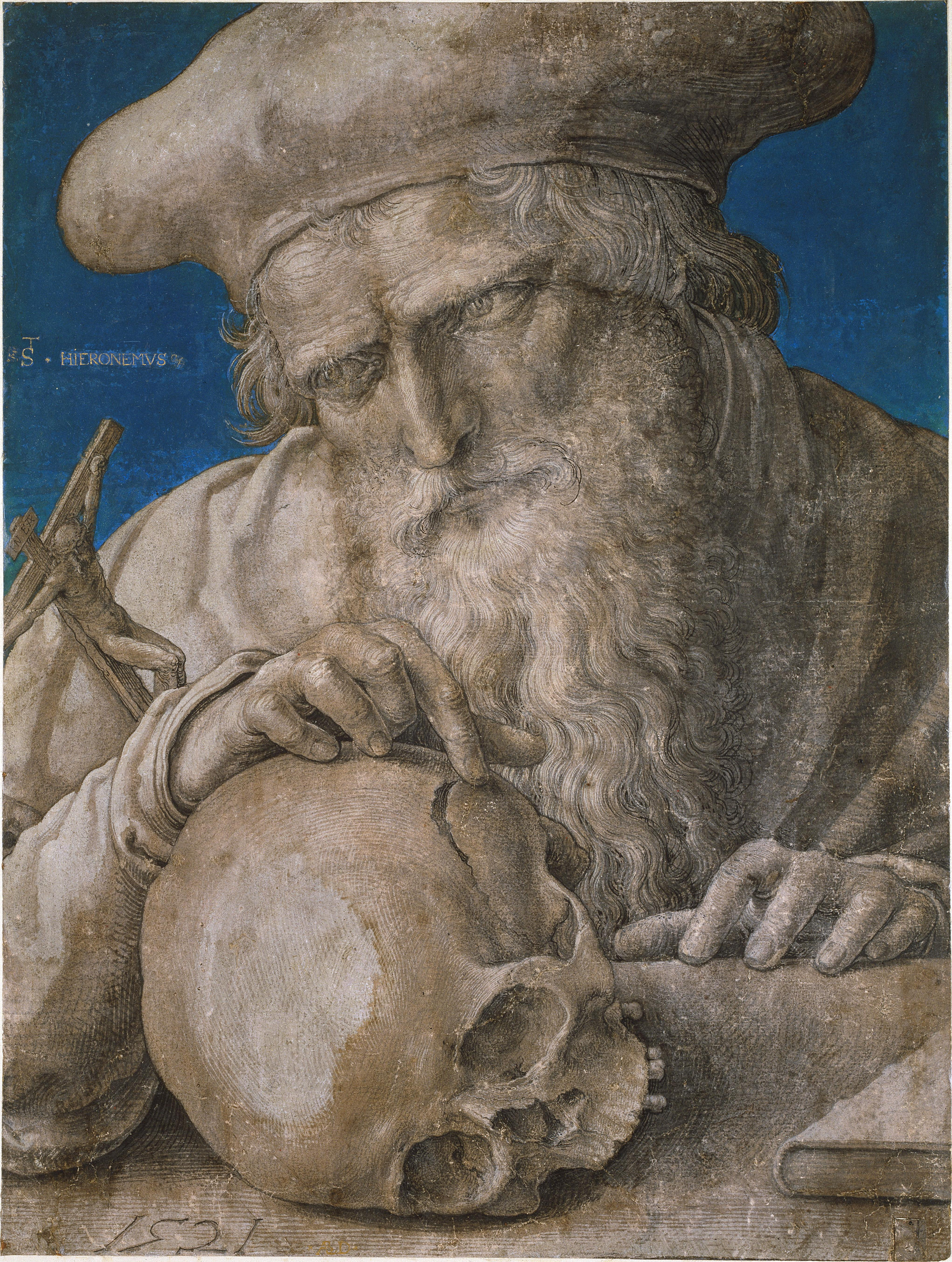
St. Jerome, by Lucas van Leyden

Skull symbolism is the attachment of symbolic meaning to the human skull. The most common symbolic use of the skull is as a representation of death.

Humans can often recognize the buried fragments of an only partially revealed cranium even when other bones may look like shards of stone. The human brain has a specific region for recognizing faces, and is so attuned to finding them that it can see faces in a few dots and lines or emoticons; the human brain cannot separate the image of the human skull from the familiar human face. Because of this, both the death and the now-past life of the skull are symbolized.

Moreover, a human skull with its large eye sockets displays a degree of neoteny, which humans often find visually appealing—yet a skull is also obviously dead, and to some can even seem to look sad due to the downward facing slope on the ends of the eye sockets. A skull with the lower jaw intact may also appear to be grinning or laughing due to the exposed teeth. As such, human skulls often have a greater visual appeal than the other bones of the human skeleton, and can fascinate even as they repel. Societies predominantly associate skulls with death and evil.

Unicode has several characters for skull pictograms, U+1F480 (💀) for a plain human skull, as well as U+2620 (☠) and U+1F571 (🕱) for human skulls with crossbones.

== Examples ==
Throughout the centuries skulls symbolized either warnings of various threats or as reminder of the vanity of earthly pleasures in contrast with our own mortality. Nevertheless, the skull seems to be omnipresent in the first decade of the twenty-first century, appearing on jewelry, bags, clothing and in the shape of various decorative items. However, the increasing use of the skull as a visual symbol in popular culture reduces its original meaning as well as its traditional connotation.

=== Literature ===
One of the best-known examples of skull symbolism occurs in Shakespeare's Hamlet, where the title character recognizes the skull of an old friend: "Alas, poor Yorick! I knew him, Horatio; a fellow of infinite jest..." Hamlet is inspired to utter a bitter soliloquy of despair and rough ironic humor.

Compare Hamlet's words "Here hung those lips that I have kissed I know not how oft" to Talmudic sources: "...Rabi Ishmael [the High Priest]... put [the severed head of a martyr] in his lap... and cried: oh sacred mouth!...who buried you in ashes...!". The skull was a symbol of melancholy for Shakespeare's contemporaries.

An old Yoruba folktale tells of a man who encountered a skull mounted on a post by the wayside. To his astonishment, the skull spoke. The man asked the skull why it was mounted there. The skull said that it was mounted there for talking. The man then went to the king, and told the king of the marvel he had found, a talking skull. The king and the man returned to the place where the skull was mounted; the skull remained silent. The king then commanded that the man be beheaded, and ordered that his head be mounted in place of the skull.

The skull speaks in the catacombs of the Capuchin brothers beneath the church of Santa Maria della Concezione in Rome, where disassembled bones and teeth and skulls of the departed Capuchins have been rearranged to form a rich Baroque architecture of the human condition, in a series of anterooms and subterranean chapels with the inscription, set in bones:

Noi eravamo quello che voi siete, e quello che noi siamo voi sarete.
"We were what you are; and what we are, you will be."

=== Art ===
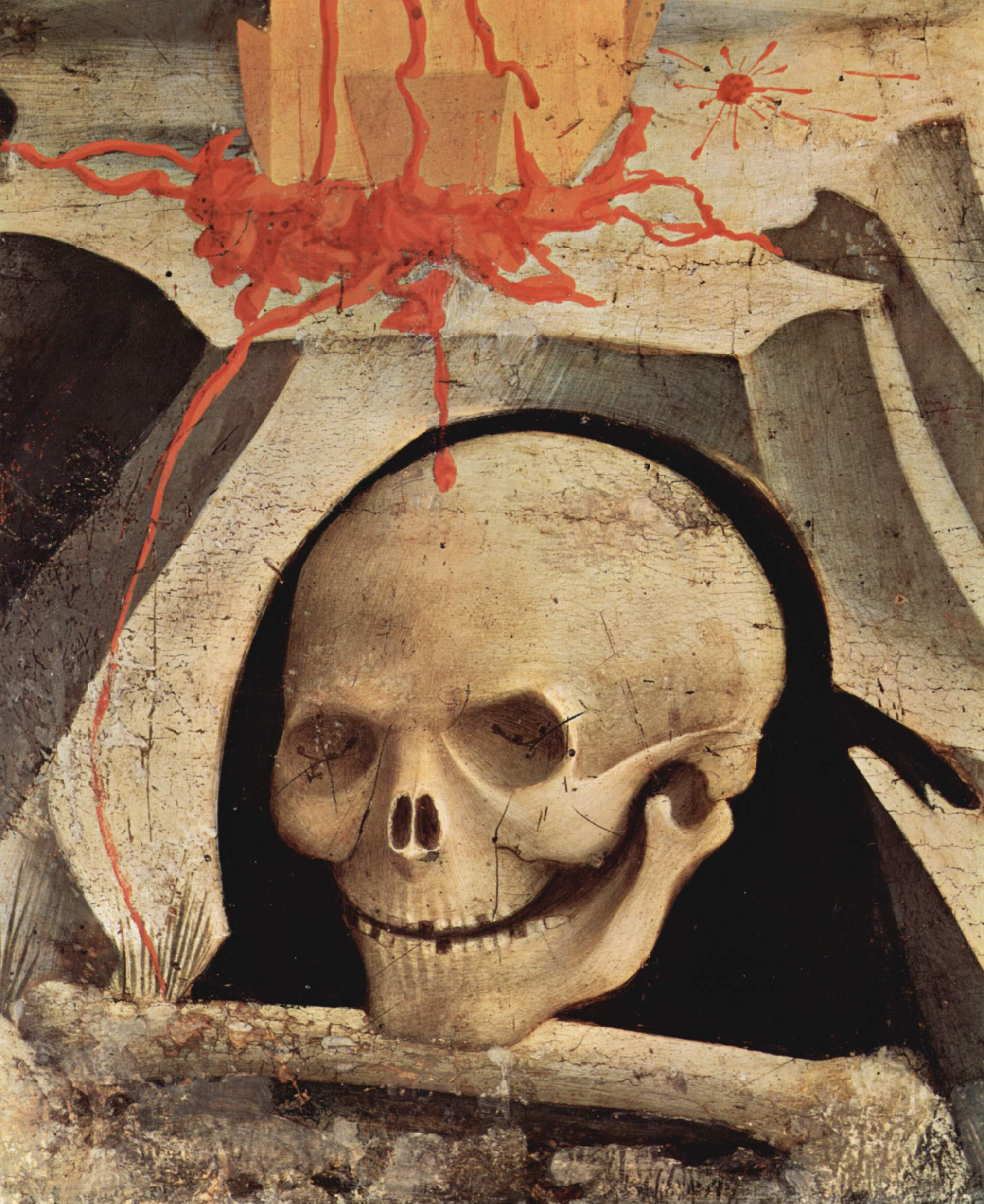
The skull of Adam at the foot of the Cross: detail from a Crucifixion by Fra Angelico, 1435

The Serpent crawling through the eyes of a skull is a familiar image that survives in contemporary Goth subculture. The serpent is a chthonic god of knowledge and of immortality, because he sloughs off his skin. The serpent guards the Tree in the Greek Garden of the Hesperides and, later, a Tree in the Garden of Eden. The serpent in the skull is always making its way through the socket that was the eye: knowledge persists beyond death, the emblem says, and the serpent has the secret.

The late medieval and Early Renaissance Northern and Italian painters place the skull where it lies at the foot of the Cross at Golgotha (Aramaic for the place of the skull). But for them it has become quite specifically the skull of Adam.

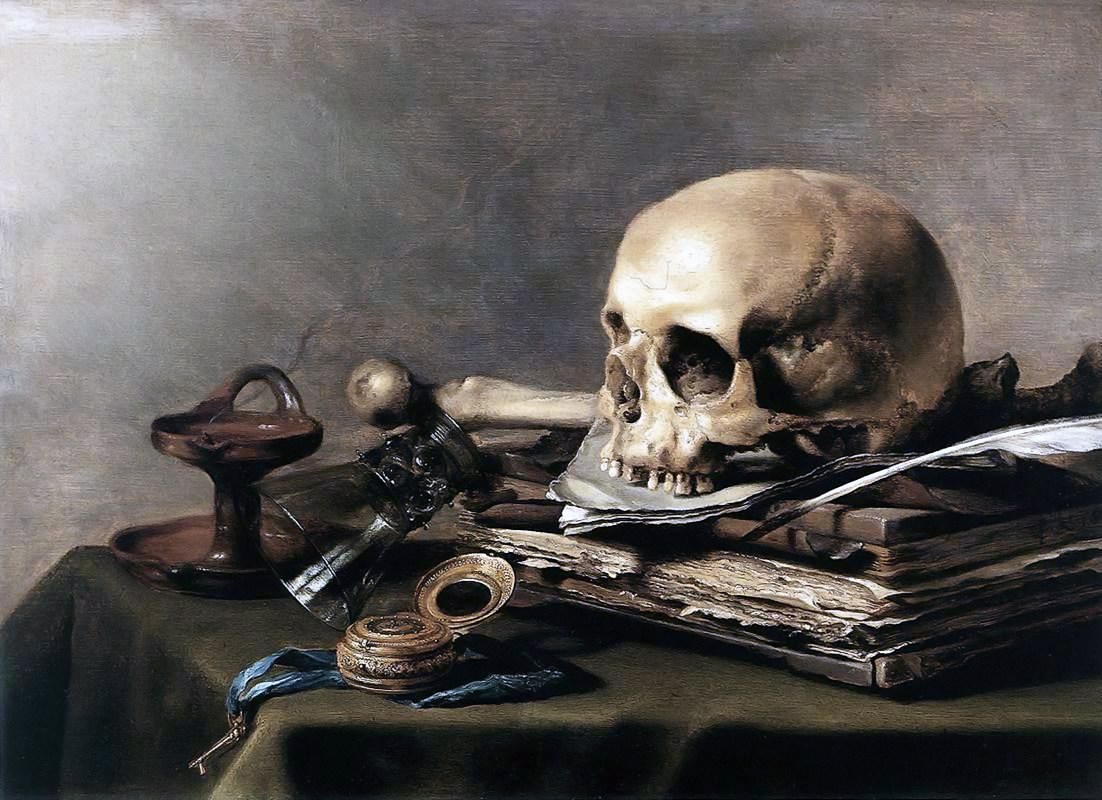
Skull on table Vanitas, by Pieter Claesz, painted in 1630

In Elizabethan England, the Death's-Head Skull, usually a depiction without the lower jawbone, was emblematic of bawds, rakes, sexual adventurers and prostitutes; the term Death's-Head was actually parlance for these rakes, and most of them wore half-skull rings to advertise their station, either professionally or otherwise. The original Rings were wide silver objects, with a half-skull decoration not much wider than the rest of the band; This allowed it to be rotated around the finger to hide the skull in polite company, and to reposition it in the presence of likely conquests.

Venetian painters of the 16th century elaborated moral allegories for their patrons, and memento mori was a common theme. The theme carried by an inscription on a rustic tomb, "Et in Arcadia ego"—"I too [am] in Arcadia", if it is Death that is speaking—is made famous by two paintings by Nicolas Poussin, but the motto made its pictorial debut in Guercino's version, 1618–22 (in the Galleria Barberini, Rome): in it, two awestruck young shepherds come upon an inscribed plinth, in which the inscription ET IN ARCADIA EGO gains force from the prominent presence of a wormy skull in the foreground.

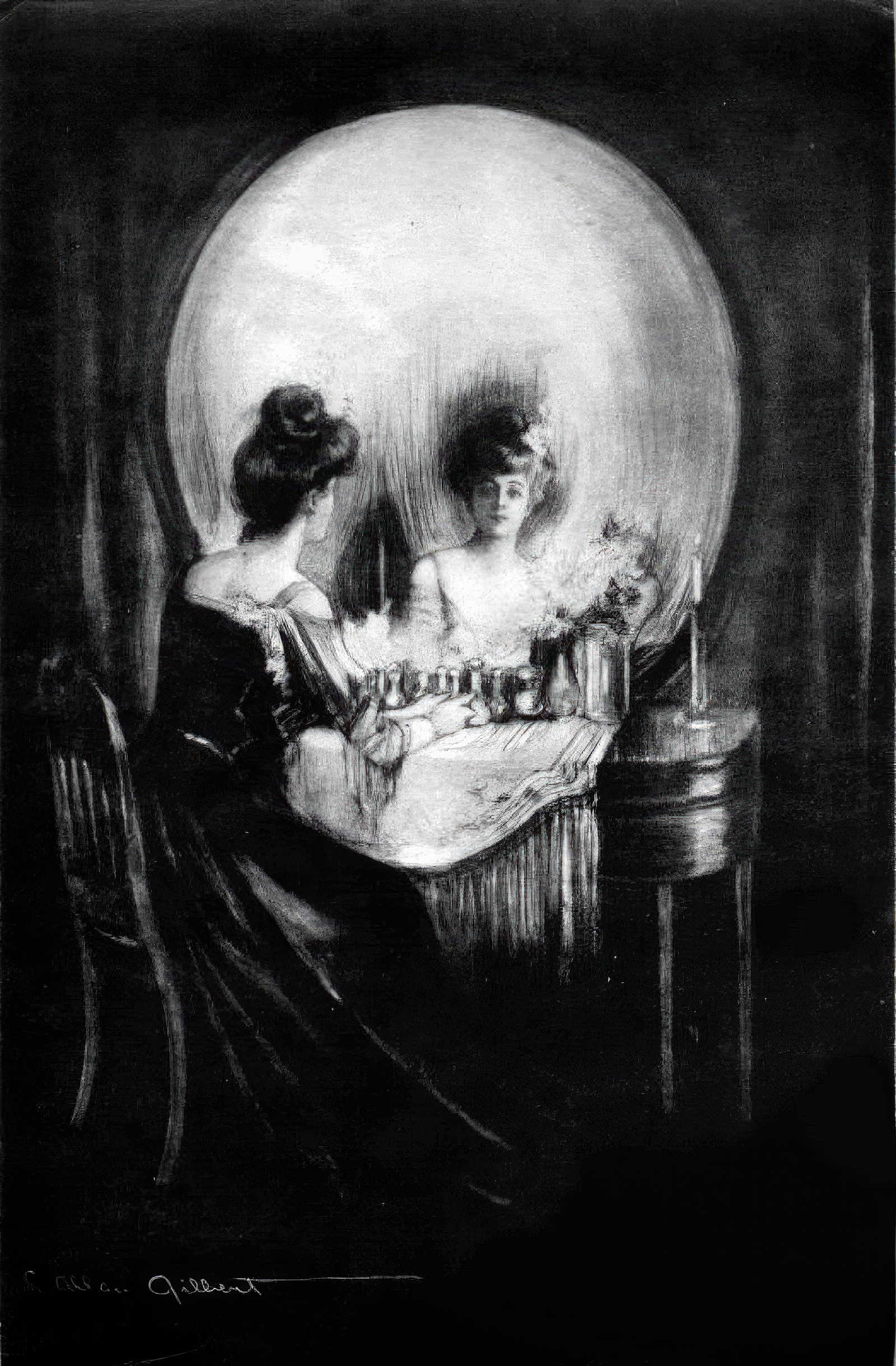
All is Vanity by C. Allan Gilbert, 1873–1929

In C. Allan Gilbert's much-reproduced lithograph of a lovely Gibson Girl seated at her fashionable vanity table, an observer can witness its transformation into an alternate image. A ghostly echo of the worldly Magdalene's repentance motif lurks behind this turn-of-the-20th century icon. The skull becomes an icon itself when its painted representation becomes a substitute for the real thing. Simon Schama chronicled the ambivalence of the Dutch to their own worldly success during the Dutch Golden Age of the first half of the 17th century in The Embarrassment of Riches.

The possibly frivolous and merely decorative nature of the still life genre was avoided by Pieter Claesz in his Vanitas: Skull, opened case-watch, overturned emptied wineglasses, snuffed candle, book: "Lo, the wine of life runs out, the spirit is snuffed, oh Man, for all your learning, time yet runs on: Vanity!" The visual cues of the hurry and violence of life are contrasted with eternity in this somber, still and utterly silent painting.

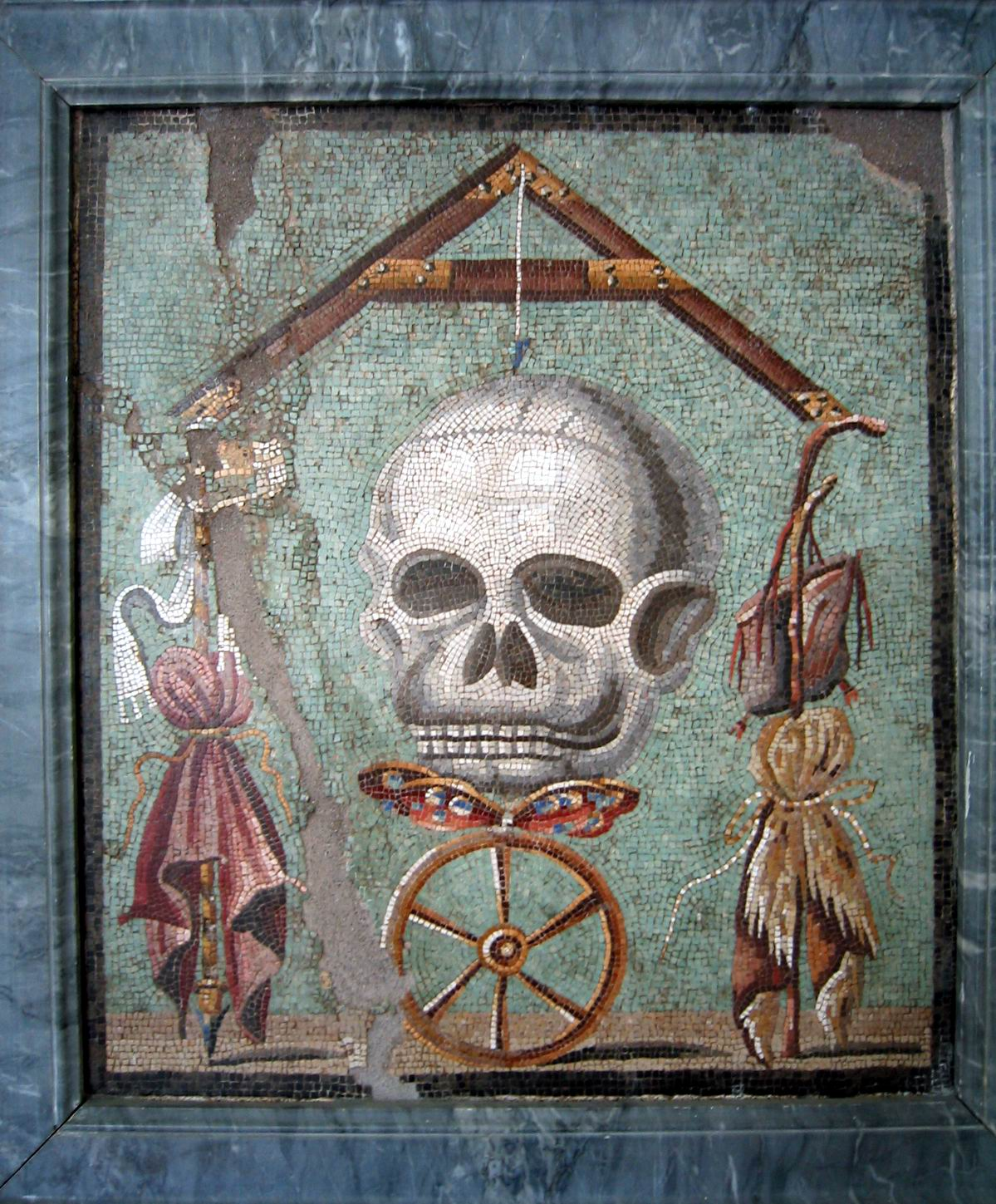
Symbolism of chance (Fortuna's wheel) divine justice (right angle and plumb-bob) and mortality in a Pompeiian mosaic

The skull speaks. It says "Et in Arcadia ego" or simply "Vanitas." In a first-century mosaic tabletop from a Pompeiian triclinium (now in Naples), the skull is crowned with a carpenter's square and plumb-bob, which dangles before its empty eyesockets (Death as the great leveler), while below is an image of the ephemeral and changeable nature of life: a butterfly atop a wheel—a table for a philosopher's symposium.

Similarly, a skull might be seen crowned by a chaplet of dried roses, a carpe diem, though rarely as bedecked as Mexican printmaker José Guadalupe Posada's Catrina.

In Mesoamerican architecture, stacks of skulls (real or sculpted) represented the result of human sacrifices.

=== Pirates ===
The pirate death's-head epitomizes the pirates' ruthlessness and despair; their usage of death imagery might be paralleled with their occupation challenging the natural order of things. "Pirates also affirmed their unity symbolically", Marcus Rediker asserts, remarking the skeleton or skull symbol with bleeding heart and hourglass on the black pirate ensign, and asserting "it triad of interlocking symbols—death, violence, limited time—simultaneously pointed to meaningful parts of the seaman's experience, and eloquently bespoke the pirates' own consciousness of themselves as preyed upon in turn. Pirates seized the symbol of mortality from ship captains who used the skull 'as a marginal sign in their logs to indicate the record of a death'"

=== Religion ===
Skull art is found in depictions of some Hindu Gods. Shiva has been depicted as carrying skull. Goddess Chamunda is described as wearing a garland of severed heads or skulls (Mundamala). Kedareshwara Temple, Hoysaleswara Temple, Chennakeshava Temple, Lakshminarayana Temple are some of the Hindu temples that include sculptures of skulls and Goddess Chamunda.

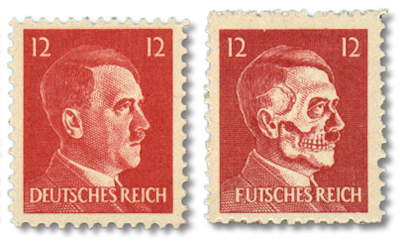
An example of the OSS "Black Propaganda" Humor: at left an Adolf Hitler profile on a "German Reich" stamp; at right the OSS-forged Hitler face version, turned into a death's head on a "Fallen Reich" stamp

=== Political symbol ===
A skull was worn as a trophy on the belt of the Lombard king Alboin, it was a constant grim triumph over his old enemy, and he drank from it. In the same way a skull is a warning when it decorates the palisade of a city, or deteriorates on a pike at a Traitor's Gate. The Skull Tower, with the embedded skulls of Serbian rebels, was built in 1809 on the highway near Niš, Serbia, as a stark political warning from the Ottoman government. In this case the skulls are the statement: that the current owner had the power to kill the former. "Drinking out of a skull the blood of slain (sacrificial) enemies is mentioned by Ammianus and Livy, and Solinus describes the Irish custom of bathing the face in the blood of the slain and drinking it." The rafters of a traditional Jívaro medicine house in Peru, or in New Guinea.

=== Other uses ===
When tattooed on the forearm its apotropaic power is thought to help an outlaw biker cheat death.

Skulls and memento mori, as for example the diamond-studded skull For the Love of God by Damien Hirst, have become a popular trend in pop culture.

Skulls have been also found on clothing items for men, women and children. Some sources credited Alexander McQueen for introducing skulls as a fashion trend with stylized skulls, starting with skull-decorated bags and scarves. The trend is extant by the early 2010s.

== See also ==
- Danse macabre
- Death (personification)
- Death's head (disambiguation)
- Jolly Roger
- Life replacement narratives, Korean myths in which a skull saves a person who worships it
- Memento mori
- Punisher's skull emblem
- Skull and Bones
- Skull and crossbones (disambiguation)
- Skull art
- Skull cup, the use of a defeated enemy's skull as a drinking cup
- Symbols of death
- The Ambassadors (Holbein)
- Totenkopf, the German word for death's head
- Tzompantli, a type of wooden rack or palisade documented in several Mesoamerican civilizations, which was used for the public display of human skulls
- Vanitas
