= Come to Salem =

Come To Salem

Compilation album by Dead Head
- Released: 2000
- Studio: Various
- Genre: Thrash metal
- Length: 52:20
- Labels: Unveiling The Wicked; Hammerheart
- Producer: Various
- Compilers: Berthus Westerhuis, Robbie Woning

Dead Head chronology
| Kill Division (1999) | Come To Salem (2000) | Haatland (2005) |

Professional ratings
Review scores
| Source | Rating |
|---|---|
| Rock Hard | 8/10 stars |

Come To Salem is the fourth album by Dutch thrash metal band Dead Head, released in 2000.

== Track listing ==
All tracks are written by Dead Head.

| No. | Title | Length |
|---|---|---|
| 1. | "The Festering" | 5:04 |
| 2. | "In Your Room" | 5:26 |
| 3. | "The Tribulation" | 1:36 |
| 4. | "Sawn In Two (Hooks Of Hemorrhage)" | 3:30 |
| 5. | "From Belial" | 8:16 |
| 6. | "Phoenix Rising" | 3:56 |
| 7. | "Sunshine" | 3:09 |
| 8. | "Slay Your Kind" | 4:25 |
| 9. | "Rites Of Kandar" | 3:58 |
| 10. | "I Tormentor" | 4:22 |
| 11. | "Die By The Sword" | 3:22 |
| 12. | "The Road Not Taken" | 3:42 |
| 13. | "From Belial (Reprise)" | 1:34 |

== Personnel ==
- Tom van Dijk - bass, vocals
- Robbie Woning - guitar
- Ronnie van der Wey - guitar
- Hans Spijker - drums
