= Le Diamant Theatre =

Performing arts venue in Québec City, Québec, Canada

Coordinates: 46.8129°N 71.2144°W

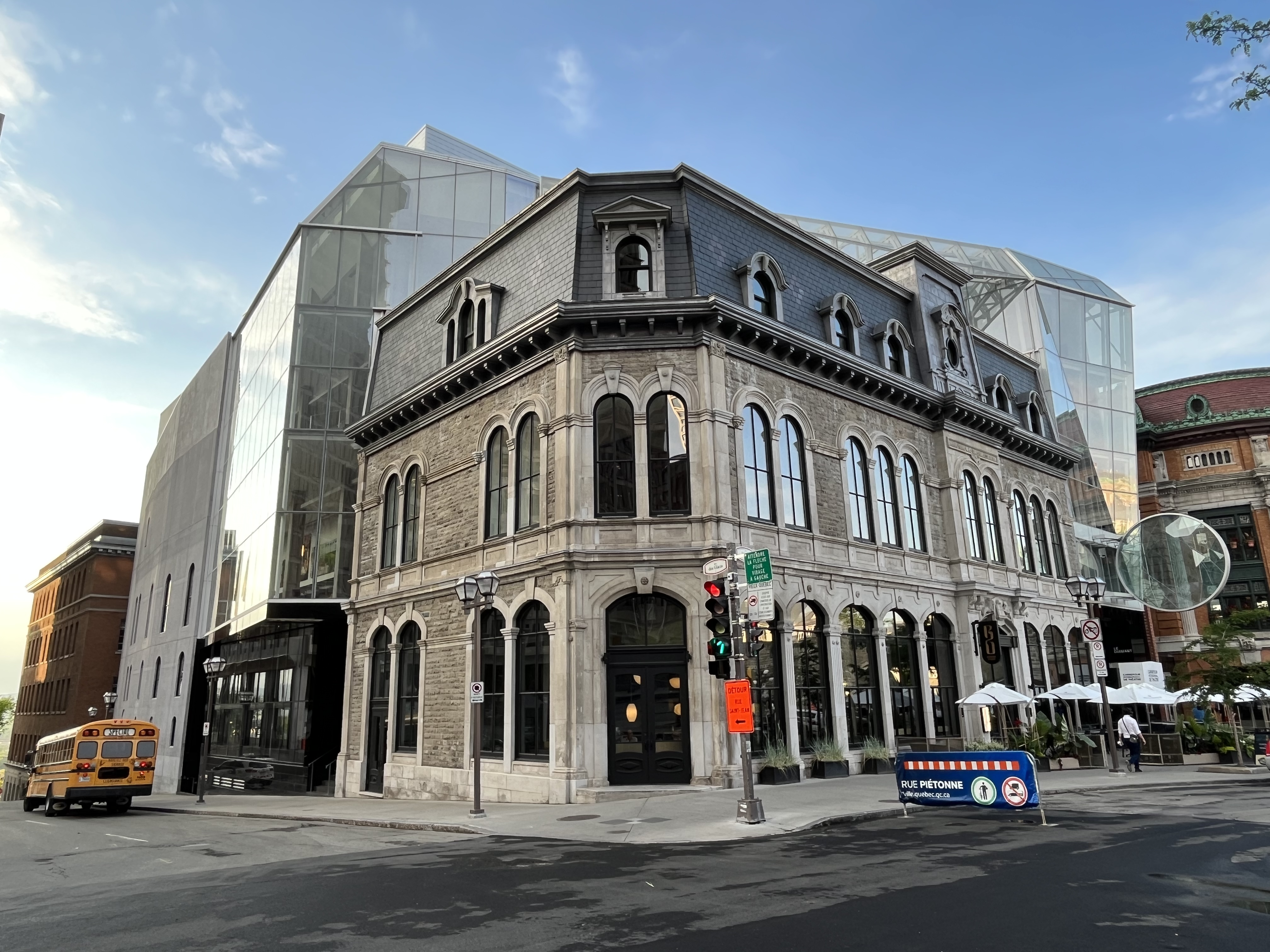
Exterior view, June 2023

Le Diamant Theatre is a large-scale performing arts venue in the center of Québec City, Québec, Canada. Coarchitecture, In Situ, Jacques Plante Architects, OPI, Trizart Alliance, and Tetra Tech were chosen as the project's primary architects and structural designers to meet Quebec City's expanding needs for leisure, entertainment, and urban development. Le Diamant unifies traditional and modern architecture with the use of glass and asymmetrical design. The theater is located at the intersection of Rue des Glacis and Rue Saint-Jean, across from the historic square, Place D'Youville, in Quebec City's Saint-Roch neighborhood. Le Diamant Theatre was built over the course of three years by the Canadian construction company Pomerleau Inc., and it opened its doors in June 2019. Le Diamant Theatre was constructed for a total cost of $54 million, with an additional $10 million from the Quebec government, and the remaining money coming from private funding. New meeting rooms, offices, parking facilities, and a link between the upper and lower towns were all built as part of the project.

Le Diamant Theatre's main auditorium has seating for up to 625 people. The theater holds several practice rooms, offices, and a café, as well as a smaller hall with seating for around 150 people. In addition, with the use of cutting-edge technology, such as sophisticated lighting and sound systems, a retractable orchestra pit, and a hydraulic stage, the building is created to host complex performances. Diamant Theatre's facade is covered by a large glass volume that glistens in the sunlight. The glass panels were designed to resemble diamond facets, hence the name "Le Diamant." A significant cultural icon in Quebec City, the theater has grown to become one of the main tourist destinations.

== History ==
In 1880, Quebec City's first YMCA is introduced on Place D'Youville. The YMCA was designed by Joseph-Ferdinand Peachy, an associate of Charles Baillairgé. It was built to house the activities of the Young Men's Christian Association for almost 60 years. In 1890, the land surrounding the fortification was still unoccupied until 1947, when the YMCA sold the building to settle in a new location. A buyer by the name of Harold Braff traded a portion of the building to the France-Film company, which led to the redevelopment of the original YMCA to make space for the new Cinema de Paris. At this time, a circular sign appears on the façade of the building, which is still in use today. In 1999, the Cinema de Paris closes, and in 2011, the multidisciplinary production company, Ex Machina, under the artistic direction of Robert Lepage, becomes the new building owner.

Before the heritage building was renovated, it had an asymmetrical plan due to the needs of the surrounding landscape. The building evoked major stylistic features of Second Empire architecture. Through the use of masonry textures, structural openings, and fine detailing, the silhouette of the YMCA building reflects the characteristics of this architectural style. Over the years, the exterior of the building has been altered to house various new companies and projects. The arcaded windows were preserved to enhance their historical story, and the roof underwent rebuilding for structural purposes. In its present state, Le Diamant Theatre has added a gem-like prism connecting the heritage building to the new performance hall.

== Exterior materiality ==
Le Diamant Theatre utilizes the history of the site by incorporating half of the existing YMCA building into the design instead of demolishing the entire building. This was achieved by cutting the former YMCA building at a sharp angle to provide a sense of modernity into a very orthogonally designed street system. As a result, a triangular interstitial space spanning the entire height of the structure was created. This acts as an interior gathering space for people in relation to Place d'Youville, the city's current cultural hub. Aside from the glass volume, the former YMCA's façade has been restored to its original state, which helps revive the street and public plaza. With its slate and tinned copper tile covering, the mansard roof has been rejuvenated with the intent of mimicking the former YMCA façade. Under the glass roof volume is a creative studio that is covered in stainless steel shingles and disappears against the sky.

=== Glass prism ===
Through the use of glass and an asymmetrical design, Le Diamant Theatre incorporates traditional, heritage architecture with modern architecture. The predominant exterior feature consists of faceted glass that has been coated with transparent and translucent materials. At the apex of the prism, there emerges an opening that extends out towards the reconstructed roof of the YMCA building, creating a terrace overlooking Place d'Youville. The faceted glass volume, which is treated with an upward, progressive translucence to indicate a new cultural location, doubles as an atrium during the day and an urban lantern at night.

=== Façade ===
Le Diamant Theater runs adjacent to Glacis Street. This side of the building is covered with prefabricated concrete panels that have a photo-engraved replica of the façade of the former YMCA wing that was never built. The architect who designed the YMCA building was named Joseph-Ferdinand Peachyand won the architectural competition for only the portion of the building that was built, yet still drew the plans for the part of the building that was never constructed. The photogravure process enables the blank façade to arise and disappear according to an optical effect of shadows and light, as well as the positions of the public and the sun. It continues to be consistent with the building's exterior, size, and architectural elements that have been retained throughout the entire design.

Le Diamant Theater's exterior materiality is also shown through the work of artist Claudie Gagnon. Commissioned with modernizing the original Cinema de Paris' sign, Gagnon transformed the original sign into a new symbol hanging overhead of the front entrance.

== Interior materiality ==
=== Entrance and mirrored walls ===
In Place d'Youville, where the former Cinema de Paris entrance previously stood, one would be greeted by a long hallway that showcases some of the previous building's heritage and cultural impacts on the community. By using reflective and parallel black surfaces for the ceiling, walls, and floor, the design of the new lobby echoes the endless reflections and mirrors the play of the old Art Deco style. It is from these materials that the interior hallway resembles the look of a diamond; hence the building's name, Le Diamant. Glass display cabinets converted into digital display systems and artifacts retrieved from the previous YMCA building serve as additional historical markers that line the walls of the hallway that leads from Place d'Youville to the main atrium of Le Diamant Theatre.

=== Atrium foyer ===
After walking through the entrance and down the diamond mimicking hallway, comes the center of Le Diamant, situated between the former YMCA building and the new performance hall. Looking through the doors towards the right is Place d'Youville, and on the left is a restaurant that is embedded into the YMCA façade. Looking towards the ceiling showcases how the YMCA building was cut on a diagonal, and how the glass prism structure connects the performance hall and YMCA building together. The atrium is adjacent on one side by a substantial glass wall that extends diagonally through the former YMCA and, in contrast, on the other by the performance hall's new opaque volume made of unfinished concrete. The atrium is then finished off with a staircase that runs from the first floor through the middle of the building, all the way to the roof top balcony.

=== Second floor foyer ===
After ascending the main staircase, the architecture transitions into the heritage of the YMCA building. By leaving some of the existing partition walls and floors within the YMCA building, part of the second floor at Le Diamant Theater remains original material. The wooden dividers were recovered and placed again, while the hardwood floor, and the molded ceilings are both original design elements that tie the two buildings together. Cast concrete walls that include the new structure reimagine the two substantial brick shear walls from the time period with their different sized arched doorways. The second floor foyer continues towards the glass volume that exposes the entrance to the public plaza as it extends itself in the direction of the rue des Glacis.

== Programming ==
Le Diamant serves as a venue for multiple performing arts events, like theatre performances, concerts, dance shows and orchestras. Its main goal is to create a hub for artistic and cultural education and to transform the building into a central platform for emerging artists to showcase their work. According to Robert Lepage, a renowned French Canadian theatre director and playwright, Le Diamant was constructed to enrich the Quebec community's cultural life and promote artistic exchange, creativity, and inclusivity.

In 2019, Le Diamant Theatre hosted its first show The Seven Streams of the River Ōta, directed by Lepage. This play was initially staged in 1994, then brought back to life to tell the stories of people affected by the atomic bombing of Hiroshima. It explored themes like memory, trauma and hope. Again in 2019, Le Diamant honors a piece brought by Ronnie Burkett, an internationally renowned puppeteer from Alberta, which brings fifty characters to life through life-sized puppets. The performance incorporates aspects of theatre, opera, music hall and vaudeville.
