= Swine Plague =

Studio album by Dead Head
- Released: 16 June 2017
- Genres: Thrash metal, death metal
- Length: 47:30
- Label: Hammerheart Records

Dead Head chronology
Depression Tank (2009)	Swine Plague (2017)	Slave Driver (2022)

Professional ratings
Review scores
Source	Rating
Metal Forces	8.5/10
Metalitalia.com	7/10
Powermetal.de	7.5/10
Stormbringer	5/5 stars

Swine Plague is the sixth album by Dutch thrash metal band Dead Head, released in 2017 through Hammerheart Records.

== Track listing ==
1. "Helhuizen" – 3:02
2. "Dühr" – 4:48
3. "Palfium" – 4:21
4. "Fortress of Greed" – 4:12
5. "The Awakening" – 3:29
6. "13 Close" – 4:08
7. "The Day of the Devil" – 4:11
8. "Spanish Horse" – 3:36
9. "The Reformation" – 1:52
10. "The Gates Beyond" – 4:54
11. "Eternity Destroyed" – 5:01
12. "The Battle of Europe" – 3:56
