= Slave Driver =

Studio album by Dead Head
- Released: 29 April 2022
- Genres: Thrash metal, death metal
- Length: 45:14
- Label: Hammerheart Records

Dead Head chronology
| Swine Plague (2017) | Slave Driver (2022) | Shadow Soul (2024) |

Professional ratings
Review scores
| Source | Rating |
|---|---|
| Imperiumi | 7/10 |
| Metal.de | 7/10 |
| Metal Hammer Germany | 5/7 |
| Metalitalia.com | 7/10 |
| Norway Rock Magazine | 4.5/6 |
| Scream Magazine | 4/6 |
| Ox-Fanzine | 4/5 stars |
| Powermetal.de | 8/10 |
| Rock Hard | 9/10 |

Slave Driver is the seventh album by Dutch thrash metal band Dead Head, released in 2022 through Hammerheart Records.

== Track listing ==
1. "Acolyte" – 4:03
2. "Grim Side Valley" – 5:26
3. "Frequency Illusion" – 2:58
4. "Southfork" – 3:08
5. "Drawn into the Wire" – 5:35
6. "Polar Vortex" – 4:01
7. "Grooves of Envy" – 5:02
8. "Parabellum" – 4:58
9. "Fear Scraper" – 5:20
10. "Horrors of Hades" – 4:43
