= Crossbones =

Crossbones may refer to:

- Crossbones (character), a Marvel Comics supervillain
- CrossBones (film), an American horror film
- Crossbones (TV series), a 2014 American television drama series
- Cross Bones, a disused burial ground in Southwark, London
- Cross Bones (novel), a 2005 novel by Kathy Reichs
- Crossbones, a Zambian music group now called Amayenge

== See also ==
- Skull and crossbones (disambiguation)
