= Haatland =

Studio album by Dead Head
- Released: 2005
- Recorded: 2005
- Studios: Hansen Studios, Ribe, Denmark
- Genre: Thrash metal
- Length: 42:30
- Labels: Extremity, GMR Music Group
- Producer: Jacob Hansen

Dead Head chronology
Come to Salem (2000)	Haatland (2005)	Depression Tank (2009)

Professional ratings
Review scores
Source	Rating
Imperiumi	6.5/10
Metal Storm	8.8/10
Ox-Fanzine	3.5/5 stars
Powermetal.de	Mixed
Rock Hard	9/10

Haatland is the fourth album by Dutch thrash metal band Dead Head, released in 2005. The album was produced by Jacob Hansen at Hansen Studios in Ribe, Denmark.

== Track listing ==
All tracks are written by Dead Head.

No.	Title	Length
1.	"Faust II"	4:05
2.	"Montana"	3:48
3.	"Phantom Palace"	4:27
4.	"Supreme Forgery"	4:24
5.	"Last Server Down"	3:53
6.	"Serial Divorce"	4:04
7.	"Mesfeken"	4:48
8.	"Dog God"	4:22
9.	"Desire"	4:21
10.	"Nosferatu"	4:05

== Personnel ==
- Tom van Dijk – bass guitar, vocals
- Robbie Woning – guitar
- Ronnie van der Wey – guitar
- Hans Spijker – drums
