= Kill Division =

Studio album by Dead Head
- Released: 1999
- Recorded: 1999
- Studios: Westerhuis Audio, Nieuwleusen, the Netherlands
- Genre: Thrash metal
- Length: 37:28
- Label: Cold Blood Industries
- Producers: Berthus Westerhuis, Dead Head

Dead Head chronology
Dream Deceiver (1993)	Kill Division (1999)	Come To Salem (2000)

Professional ratings
Review scores
Source	Rating
Imperiumi	8.5/10
Ox-Fanzine	4/5 stars
Rock Hard	8.5/10
Scream Magazine	3/6
Terrorizer	7/10

Kill Division is the third album by Dutch thrash metal band Dead Head, released in 1999. The album was produced by Bert Westerhuis at Westerhuis Audio.

== Track listing ==
No.	Title	Writer(s)	Length
1.	"Kill Division"	Dead Head	3:46
2.	"Cold Being"	Dead Head	3:36
3.	"Waste of Skin"	Dead Head	2:26
4.	"Six"	Dead Head	2:30
5.	"Mahler"	Dead Head	3:28
6.	"Sprayed into Oblivion"	Dead Head	3:25
7.	"Wings on Fire"	Dead Head	2:21
8.	"Where Silence Dwells"	Dead Head	3:17
9.	"The Hustler"	Dead Head	2:10
10.	"Until the Sun Appears"	Dead Head	3:24
11.	"Souls of Ice"	Dead Head	3:55
12.	"Heavy Metal Thunder"	Saxon	3:10

== Personnel ==
- Tom van Dijk – bass, vocals
- Robbie Woning – guitar
- Ronnie van der Wey – guitar
- Hans Spijker – drums
