= Depression Tank =

Studio album by Dead Head
- Released: February 2009
- Recorded: 2008
- Studios: Hooiland Studios, Zwolle, the Netherlands
- Genre: Thrash metal
- Length: 41:19
- Label: Displeased
- Producer: Dead Head

Dead Head chronology
Haatland (2005)	Depression Tank (2009)	Swine Plague (2017)

Professional ratings
Review scores
Source	Rating
Metal Temple	5/10
Metalfan.nl	85/100
Metalzone	85%

Depression Tank is the fifth studio album by Dutch thrash metal band Dead Head, released in 2009. Dead Head released a "reimagined" version of the album in 2025, titled Repression Tank.

== Track listing ==
All tracks are written by Dead Head.

No.	Title	Length
1.	"Dissolved in Purity"	3:21
2.	"Green Angel"	2:20
3.	"Cryptocynic"	4:20
4.	"The Swing"	3:41
5.	"Daemonique"	4:57
6.	"Firegate"	3:41
7.	"Less Than Zero"	2:33
8.	"Hateland"	3:41
9.	"Nero Dies"	4:42
10.	"Murder"	3:29
11.	"Pesticide"	4:34
Total length:		41:19

== Personnel ==
- Ralph de Boer – bass, vocals
- Robbie Woning – guitar
- Ronnie van der Wey – guitar
- Hans Spijker – drums
