= Shadow Soul =

EP by Dead Head
- Released: 29 April 2022
- Genres: Thrash metal, death metal
- Length: 27:28
- Label: Hammerheart Records

Dead Head chronology
Slave Driver (2022)	Shadow Soul (2022)	Repression Tank (2025)

Professional ratings
Review scores
Source	Rating
Dead Rhetoric	8.5/10
Inferno.fi	4/5 stars
Metal Forces	8/10
Metal Hammer Germany	5/7
Norway Rock Magazine	4.5/6
Scream Magazine	5/6
Ox-Fanzine	3.5/5 stars
Powermetal.de	8/10
Rock Hard	8/10
Vampster	Mixed

Shadow Soul is the third EP by Dutch thrash metal band Dead Head, released in 2024 through Hammerheart Records.

== Track listing ==
1. "Litany of the Weak" – 4:15
2. "Serpents of Fame" – 4:44
3. "Caverns of Fate" – 5:14
4. "Defiance" – 1:42
5. "The Age of Hype" – 3:28
6. "The Run" – 3:00
7. "Oppulent Disruption" – 3:15
8. "Dark Emptiness" – 1:50
