= Deadheading =

Deadheading can refer to the following:

- Dead mileage, the movement of commercial vehicles in non-revenue mode for logistical reasons
- Deadheading (flowers), the pruning of dead flower heads
- Deadheading (employee), carrying, free of charge, a transport company's own staff on a normal passenger trip

== See also ==
- Deadhead (disambiguation)
