= The Feast Begins at Dawn =

The Feast Begins At Dawn

Studio album by Dead Head
- Released: 1991
- Recorded: March–June 1991
- Studio: Franky's Recording Kitchen, Nieuwleusen, the Netherlands
- Genre: Thrash metal, death metal
- Length: 49:42
- Label: Bad Taste Recordings
- Producer: Berthus Westerhuis, Dead Head, Clemens Väth

Dead Head chronology
The Festering (1990)	The Feast Begins At Dawn (1991)	Dream Deceiver (1993)

Professional ratings
Review scores
Source	Rating
Rock Hard	8/10 stars

The Feast Begins At Dawn is the debut album of Dutch thrash metal band Dead Head. It was recorded at Franky's Recording Kitchen, Nieuwleusen, the Netherlands from March 6 through July 1991 and released by Bad Taste Recordings.

== Track listing ==
All tracks are written by Dead Head

No.	Title	Length
1.	"Untergang des Abendlandes"	1:44
2.	"Saved"	4:34
3.	"Desolated By the Shining"	4:33
4.	"In Your Room"	5:35
5.	"Below the Earth"	0:36
6.	"Slay Your Kind"	4:40
7.	"Rites of Kandar"	4:02
8.	"The Tribulation"	1:52
9.	"Pesticide"	4:37
10.	"The Festering"	5:13
11.	"From Belial"	8:26
12.	"The Feast Begins at Dawn"	3:54

== Personnel ==
- Tom van Dijk – bass, vocals
- Robbie Woning – guitar
- Ronnie van der Wey – guitar
- Hans Spijker – drums
