= Dream Deceiver =

Studio album by Dead Head
- Released: 1993
- Recorded: Westerhuis Audio, Nieuwleusen, the Netherlands, 1993
- Genres: Thrash metal, death metal
- Length: 48:00
- Label: Bad Taste
- Producers: Gert Stegeman, Dead Head, Clemens Väth

Dead Head chronology
| The Feast Begins at Dawn (1991) | Dream Deceiver (1993) | Kill Division (1999) |

Professional ratings
Review scores
| Source | Rating |
|---|---|
| Inferno.fi | 4/5 stars |
| Rock Hard | 8.5/10 |

Dream Deceiver is the second album by Dutch thrash metal band Dead Head, released in 1993. It was the follow-up to The Feast Begins at Dawn, and features slower tempos, melodic guitar harmonies, and more death metal influence than the debut. Dream Deceiver was produced by Gert Stegeman at Westerhuis Audio. It is the only album by Dead Head not to feature Hans Spijker on drums, instead featuring Marco Kleinnibbelink.

== Track listing ==
All tracks are written by Dead Head.

| No. | Title | Length |
|---|---|---|
| 1. | "Angel Heart" | 4:11 |
| 2. | "House of Ambience" | 4:06 |
| 3. | "Repulsive Emission" | 3:50 |
| 4. | "Unholy" | 5:00 |
| 5. | "Dream Deceiver" | 5:13 |
| 6. | "I or the Needle" | 6:24 |
| 7. | "Crimson Remains" | 6:07 |
| 8. | "Shifting Sands" | 1:48 |
| 9. | "Dying Angels" | 4:47 |
| 10. | "Spiritual Suicide" | 6:37 |

== Personnel ==
- Tom van Dijk – bass, vocals
- Robbie Woning – guitar
- Ronnie van der Wey – guitar
- Marco Kleinnibbelink – drums
