= Theta nigrum =

Symbol of death

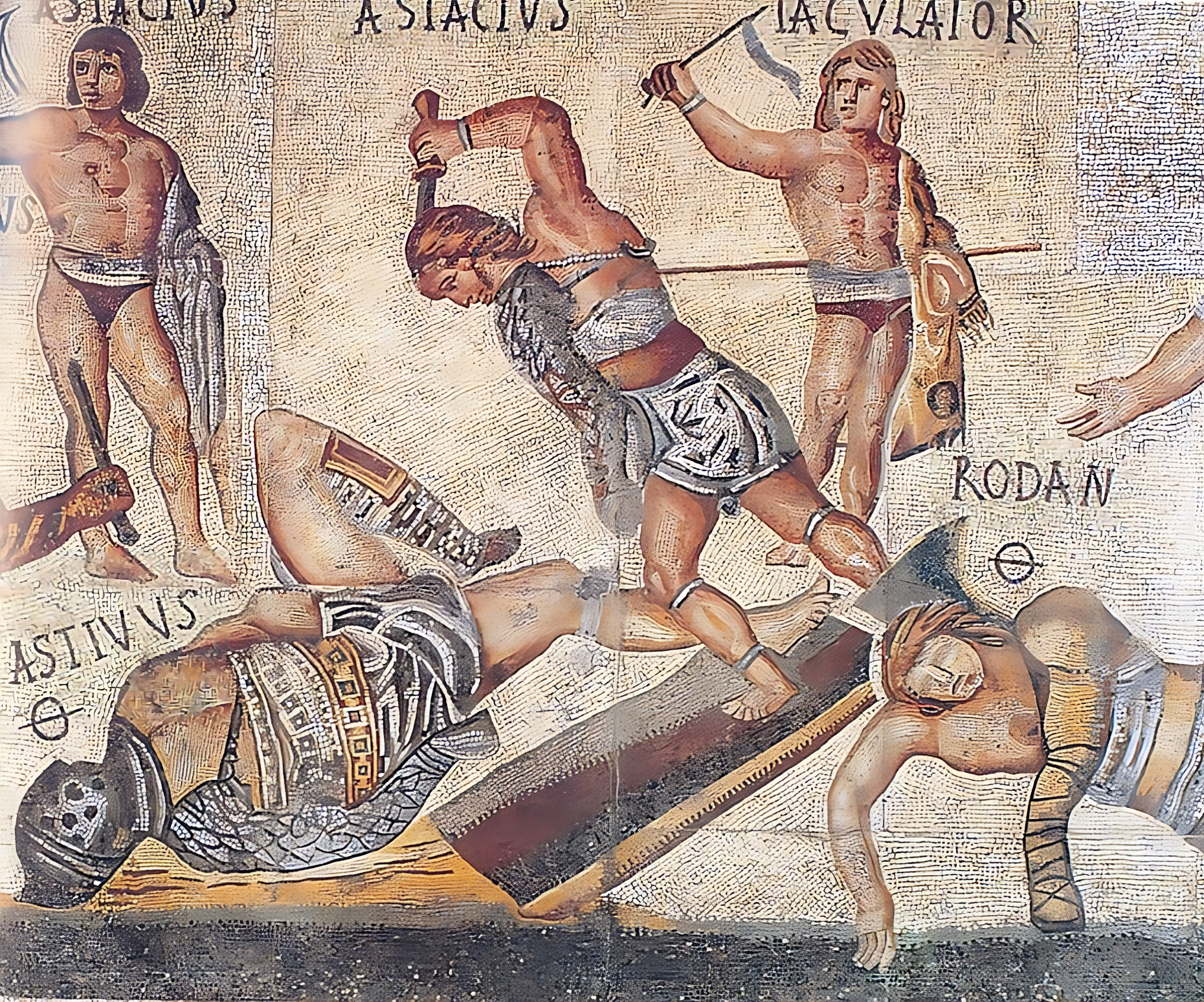
Retiarius vs Secutor, the two gladiators lying are dead, as signified by the theta nigrum.

The theta nigrum (lit. 'black theta') or theta infelix (lit. 'unlucky theta') is a symbol of death in Greek and Latin epigraphy. Isidore of Seville notes the letter was appended after the name of a deceased soldier and finds of papyri containing military records have confirmed this use. Additionally it can be seen in the Gladiator Mosaic.

The term theta nigrum was coined by Theodor Mommsen. It consists of a circle with a horizontal line and thus resembles the majuscule Θ (theta) of the Greek alphabet. The theta signified Thanatos, the Greek deity of death.

== Computer encoding ==
The symbol is not encoded in Unicode but the U+0398 Θ GREEK CAPITAL LETTER THETA (&Theta;), U+03F4 ϴ GREEK CAPITAL THETA SYMBOL and U+2C90 Ⲑ COPTIC CAPITAL LETTER THETHE can all be used as a substitute. However, the theta nigrum can be reproduced most accurately by the U+A74A Ꝋ LATIN CAPITAL LETTER O WITH LONG STROKE OVERLAY, as this is the only symbol in which the cross stroke consistently protrudes beyond the circle.

== See also ==
- Scribal abbreviation – Abbreviations used by ancient and medieval scribes
