= Skull and crossbones (disambiguation) =

The skull and crossbones is a symbol of a human skull with two long bones crossed below it. It was historically used on the Jolly Roger pirate flag, and sees modern-day usage as a warning against poison or other deadly hazards.

Skull and crossbones may also refer to:

- Skull and crossbones (military), in variations used by several military forces
- Skull and crossbones (fraternities and sports), used also by secret societies
- Skull and crossbones (Spanish cemetery), "campo santo", used to mark the entrances to cemeteries
- Skull & Crossbones (video game), 1987 video game by Atari Games
- Skull & Crossbones (role-playing game), 1980 role-playing game
- U+2620 ☠ SKULL AND CROSSBONES, a Unicode code point in the Miscellaneous Symbols block

Skull and Bones may refer to:

- Skull and Bones, a senior society at Yale University
- Skull & Bones (album), by the rap group Cypress Hill
- Skull and Bones (video game), 2024 video game by Ubisoft
- Skull & Bones (role-playing game supplement), 2003 role-playing game supplement
- Skull & Bones (band), power metal band from Argentina
- Skull and Bones (Doja Cat song), off the album Scarlet
- Skull and Bones Gangs, secret societies in New Orleans

== See also ==
- Crossbones (disambiguation)
