= Rexford Newcomb =

American architect

Rexford G. Newcomb (April 24, 1886 – March 16, 1968) was an American architectural historian.

== Biography ==
Newcomb was born in Independence, Kansas, on April 24, 1886. After undergraduate study at the University of Kansas, he earned both a second bachelor's degree in architecture and a master's in architecture at the University of Illinois, and a master of arts at the University of Southern California. He married Ruth Bergen on October 24, 1911 in Wichita, Kansas; they had three children.

After stints teaching at the Long Beach Polytechnic High School and Long Beach Evening High School, University of Southern California and Texas A&M University, Newcomb returned to the University of Illinois as a faculty member in 1918. He remained there until 1954. He served as dean of the College of Fine and Applied Arts from 1932 to 1954. He was also the second president of the Society of Architectural Historians.

Newcomb died on March 16, 1968, at Princeton, Illinois.

== Recognition ==
Newcomb was elected a Fellow of the American Institute of Architects in 1940, and a Fellow of the American Association for the Advancement of Science in 1928. His book Architecture of the Old Northwest Territory was the 1950 winner of the Alice Davis Hitchcock Award.

Newcomb's collected papers are held by the University of Illinois library system.

== Selected books ==
- Newcomb, Rexford (1916). The Franciscan Mission Architecture of Alta California. New York: Architectural Book Publishing Co. Reprinted by Dover Publications in 1973, ISBN 0-486-21740-X.
- Newcomb, Rexford (1922). Outline of the History of Architecture. University of Illinois.. Republished as Outlines of the History of Architecture in four separate volumes by John Wiley & Sons, Inc., 1931–1939.
- Newcomb, Rexford (1925). The Old Mission Churches and Historic Houses of California: Their History, Architecture, Lore. Philadelphia: J.B. Lippincott Company.
- Newcomb, Rexford (1927). Hispanic Architecture: The Spanish House For America. Its Design, Furnishing and Garden. Philadelphia: J.B. Lippincott Company.
- Newcomb, Rexford (1928). In the Lincoln Country: Journeys to the Lincoln Shrines of Kentucky, Indiana, Illinois and Other States. Philadelphia: J.B. Lippincott Company.
- Newcomb, Rexford (1928). Mediterranean Domestic Architecture in the United States. Acanthus Press LLC. ISBN 0-926494-13-9.
- Newcomb, Rexford; Foster, William A. (1932). Home Architecture: A Textbook for Schools and Colleges, a Manual for the Home Builder and Home Owner. New York: John Wiley & Sons, Inc.
- Newcomb, Rexford (1937). Spanish-Colonial Architecture in the United States. New York: JJ Augustin. ISBN 978-0-486-26263-5. Reprinted by Dover Publications in 1990.
- Newcomb, Rexford (1947). Ceramic Whitewares: History, Technology and Applications. New York: Pitman.
- Newcomb, Rexford (1950). Architecture of the Old Northwest Territory: A Study of Early Architecture in Ohio, Indiana, Illinois, Michigan, Wisconsin, and Part of Minnesota. Chicago: University of Chicago Press.
- Newcomb, Rexford (1953). Architecture in Old Kentucky. Urbana: University of Illinois Press.
