= Interstitial space =

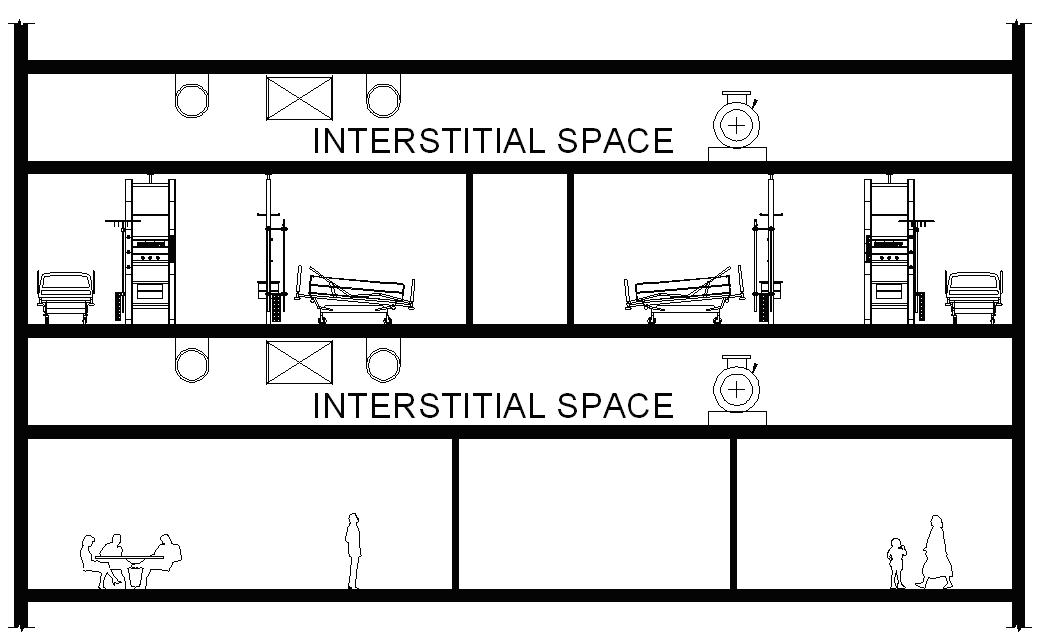
Hypothetical interstitial space design for a medical facility.

An interstitial space is an intermediate space located between regular-use floors, commonly located in hospitals and laboratory-type buildings to allow space for the mechanical systems of the building. By providing this space, laboratory and hospital rooms may be easily rearranged throughout their lifecycles and therefore reduce lifecycle cost.

== Description ==
An interstitial space is useful when the mechanical system of the building is highly sophisticated and changing the space on the primary floors is a distinct possibility. The heights of these spaces are generally 6 to 8 feet (1.8 to 2.4 m) and allow easy access for repair or alteration. If changes or maintenance need to be performed in the interstitial space, the primary space does not need to be shut down, which is important in buildings like hospitals where the equipment in the space must operate constantly. Unlike traditionally built buildings, where the mechanical space is located in the basement or on the top floor, the interstitial space needs few vertical penetrations and therefore leaves more open space on the primary floor. The entire floor plan of these buildings can be more open because there are fewer fixed vertical penetrations through the floor and walls.

Another way to use an interstitial space is to incorporate a design that divides the functions of the building into groups and localizes them. The Zeidler Partnership Architects’ (ZPA) design of the William Osler Health Centre (WOHC) in Brampton, Ontario, is one example of this design. (Note: this was designed but ZPA was not awarded the project.) The groups in this design are based on similar structural and mechanical systems. Flexible design allows for easy expansion or redesign in the future. Horizontal expansion is especially easy because of the interstitial space between the surgical suite and the emergency floors, where the mechanical system functions are the most crucial in this building. Double floor height is used to maintain the horizontal flow of connections throughout the rest of the building without causing any interference with other building systems.

== History ==
The idea of using an interstitial space was started in the 1960s by professors at Texas A&M University’s College of Architecture. Their concept was to standardize spaces and allow for rapid changes in medical facilities. While the spaces for building systems like plumbing, mechanical, and electrical systems were not as large as today’s, it was an important beginning of an idea to separate the systems by floor. The first building to actually use an interstitial space design was Louis Kahn’s Salk Institute of Biological Studies in La Jolla, California. The design allowed the building to keep up with ever-changing technology. From there, designs progressed to concepts created by Zeidler Partnership Architects (ZPA); a firm who has completed over 40 healthcare and lab facilities for buildings using an interstitial space design. Today, many firms have drawn inspiration from ZPA and use their concept to develop their own design. Some designs cover the whole floor area and some, like the WOHC, are partial interstitial spaces.

== Pros and cons of using an interstitial space ==
=== Pros ===
Interstitial spaces are exceedingly useful when a building needs to be re-modeled. In a medical or lab facility, where technology can change quickly, future equipment sizes and requirements can be unpredictable. With an interstitial space, room layouts in the primary floor may be altered much more easily than traditionally designed buildings since there are fewer service stacks penetrating the floors. The walls can be arranged and rearranged freely. If a drastic renovation must occur, only one floor at a time has to be shut down for renovation, instead of the whole building. The cost of the building is reduced significantly since major equipment does not have to be changed during a renovation. Lifecycle cost includes anything that pertains to the building from when it is in its schematic design phase until it is demolished. A chart of the cost distribution is shown in figure 2. If the equipment itself must be retrofitted, it can be done faster, since the spaces have ample area to work and are separated by floor. The lifetime of the building may also be increased, since the adaptable spaces may be retrofitted instead of needing to be torn down for a redesigned building.

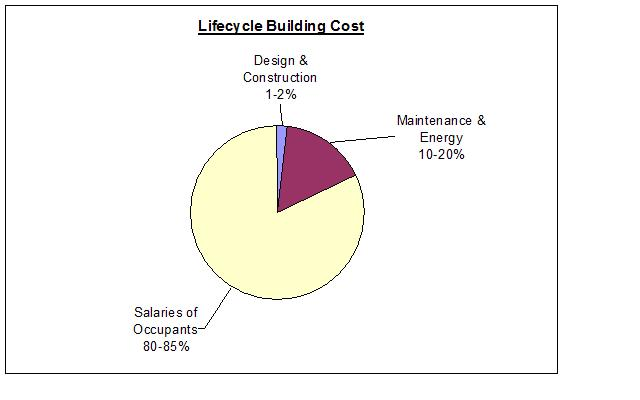
Figure 2. Lifecycle building cost pie chart

Separating the building systems from the primary space can also be helpful during construction. If sequenced correctly, it can decrease the installation time of major equipment significantly. Each trade may work on one floor and move to the next after another is finished. Also, wall, ceiling, and floor finishes may be worked on while the building systems are installed as opposed to a traditionally designed building where they would have to wait for more equipment to be installed.

Another advantage of using an interstitial space is that easy access to the equipment in them may encourage preventative maintenance. If a more efficient system can be installed easily, it can again reduce lifecycle cost.

=== Cons ===
The largest and most well known negative of interstitial spaces is a high first cost. Adding more floors increases the amount of material used for floor decks, walls, etc. The construction expense becomes much larger when anything is added because it affects many other systems in the building. One main thing that increases is the amount of façade material necessary to cover the skin of the building. Depending on that material, the cost and time of construction could be largely inflated.

Equipment costs can become a large deterrent of owners also. Several smaller pieces of equipment must be purchased for each floor instead of one large piece for the whole building. The large piece of equipment is much cheaper than all of the small pieces combined in almost every case.
