= Death's head =

Death's Head, death's head, death's-head, Deathshead, or deathshead may refer to:

- Human skull, the head of the personification of Death
  - Skull and crossbones
  - Totenkopf, a German military insignia
- Death's head cockroach (Blaberus craniifer), a species of cockroach
- Death's-head hawkmoth, the common name for three species of moth
- SS-Totenkopfverbände, Nazi German military unit distinguished by a totenkopf insignia
- Death's Head (Marvel Comics), a robotic bounty hunter from Marvel Comics
- Death's Head (series), science fiction novels by David Gunn
- The official "death's head" insignia design of the Hells Angels Motorcycle Club
- Wilhelm "Deathshead" Strasse, fictional antagonist in the Wolfenstein video game franchise
- The Blood Beast Terror, also known as The Deathshead Vampire, a 1968 British horror film starring Peter Cushing
- "Deaths-Head Revisited", a 1961 Twilight Zone episode

== See also ==
- Caput mortuum
- The Deathhead Virgin, a 1974 American horror film
- Decapitation
- Human skull symbolism
