= Skull and crossbones (cemetery) =

Cemetery ornament

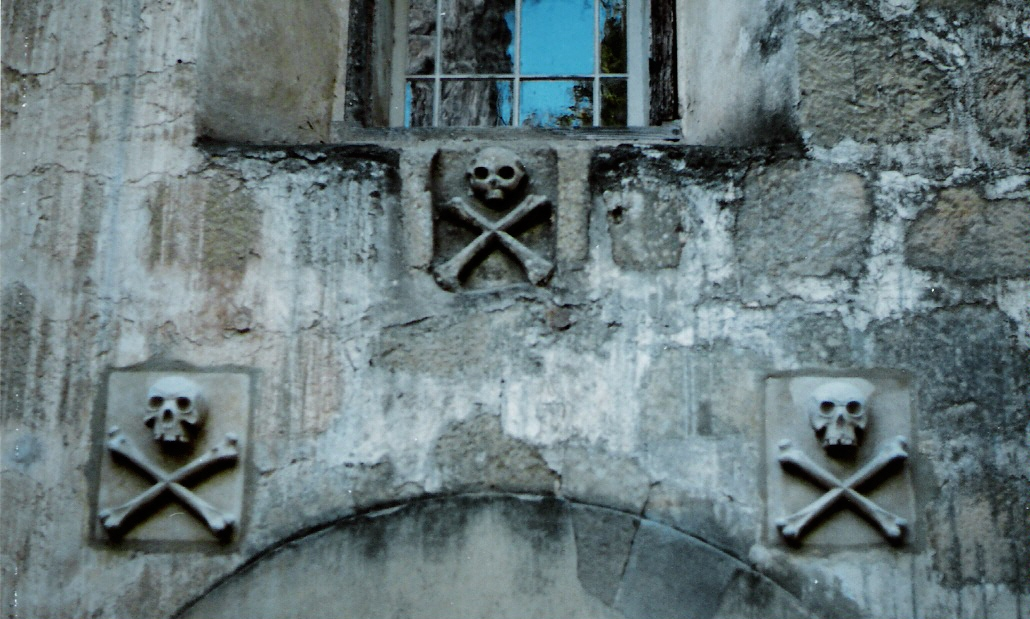
At Mission Santa Barbara, a religious outpost founded in California in 1786, stone "skull and crossbone" carvings denote the cemetery entrance.

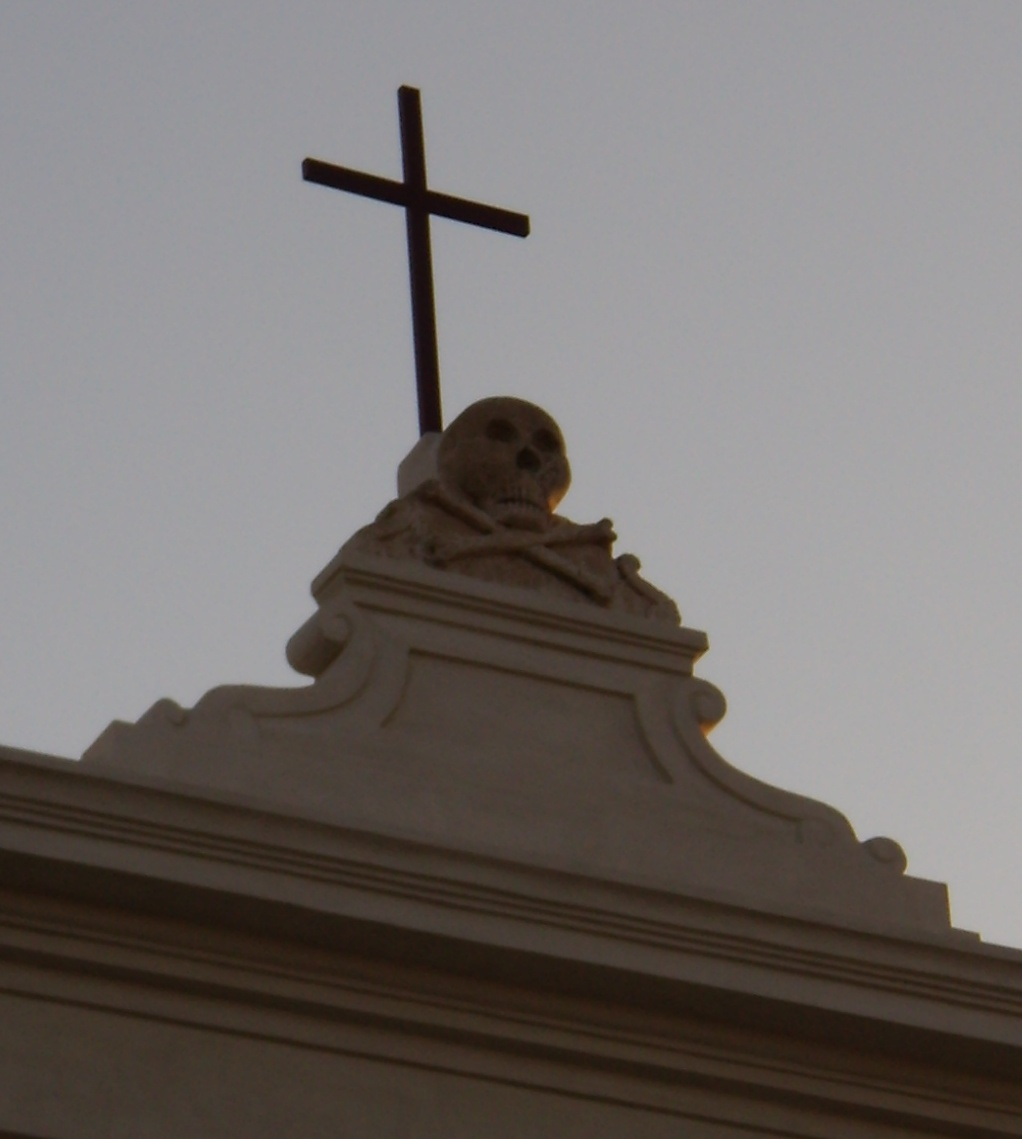
At Gallipoli, Italy, cross over skull and crossbones in the church Oratorio Confraternale delle Anime del Purgatorio (1660).

Actual skulls and bones were long used to mark the entrances to Spanish cemeteries (campo santo). The practice, dating back many centuries, led to the symbol eventually becoming associated with the concept of death. Some crucifixes feature a skull and crossbones beneath the corpus (the depiction of Jesus' body), in reference to a legend that the place of the crucifixion was also the burial place of Adam or, more likely, in reference to the New Testament statement (King James Version: Matthew 27:33, Mark 15:22, and John 19:17) that the place of his crucifixion was called "Golgotha" (tr. "the Place of a Skull").

Today, an example of a real skull and crossbones may be seen in the 1732 Nuestra Señora del Pilar church overlooking the famous Recoleta Cemetery in Buenos Aires, Argentina. It contains several altars rescued from other early Spanish churches in South America. One of these has twenty rectangular window boxes arrayed behind and above the altar, five wide by four tall. The size of these glass window boxes is such that the femurs of the priests thus interred are a bit too long to lie flat and so must be leaned up in an "X" formation. The other bones fill in the spaces around the femurs with the skull sitting prominently on top of the bone pile centered above the "X".

== Other countries ==
The Jolly Roger, and the similar Totenkopf was a popular symbol of mortality at this time across Europe and has its origins in the medieval Danse Macabre.

Tombstones from the 18th century in Southern Scotland fairly frequently feature skull and crossbones.

The Church of St Nicholas in Deptford features two Deaths Heads on its gateposts dating to the early 18th century.
