= Dead Head (band) =

Dutch thrash metal band

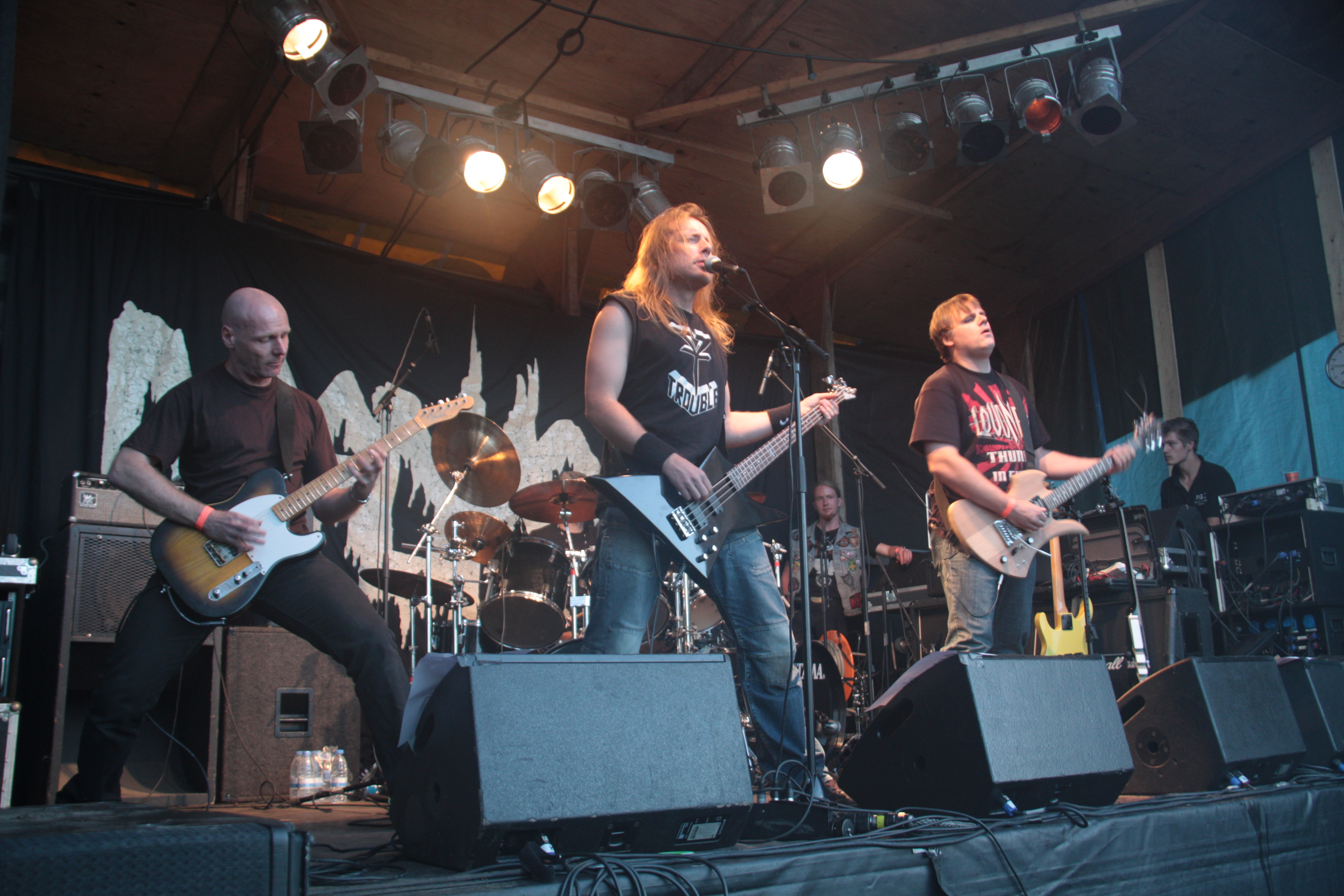
- Dead Head at Occultfest 2010

Background information
- Origin: Kampen, Netherlands
- Genres: Thrash metal, death metal
- Years active: 1989–present
- Labels: Hammerheart Records, Petrichor, Displeased, Extremity/GMR, Cold Blood Industries, Unveiling The Wicked, Fadeless, Bad Taste Recordings
- Members: Ralph de Boer; Robbie Woning; Ronnie van der Wey; Hans Spijker
- Past members: Tom van Dijk; Marco Kleinnibbelink; Michiel Dekker; Johan Wesdijk; Alex Geerts
- Website: deadhead.nl

Dead Head is a Dutch thrash metal band from the city Kampen. The band was formed in 1989 by the four original members Tom van Dijk (bass, vocals), Robbie Woning (guitar), Ronnie van der Wey (guitar), and Hans Spijker (drums). Their mission was to become the most intensive and brutal thrash metal band Europe ever had seen. They were influenced by classic thrash metal bands like Dark Angel, Kreator and Sadus.

They released their debut album in 1991, and have released seven studio albums and one 10 inch.

== History ==
Dead Head were formed in 1989 and after releasing a number of demos, in 1990 they scored a record deal with the German company Rising Sun Records, who released Dead Head's first album, The Feast Begins at Dawn, in 1991. After the recordings for the debut album Dead Head did a tour through Denmark with Edge of Sanity and Invocator, and played in Holland with Sepultura, Heathen, Skyclad, Candlemass, Suffocation, Sinister, Gorefest, Malevolent Creation and Grave.

Their original drummer Hans Spijker was replaced by Marco Kleinnibbelink in 1992. With their new drummer Dead Head started working on new material for their second album which resulted in the album Dream Deceiver in 1993. Before the release of that album Dead Head did a European tour with the band Massacra. During the tour Dead Head played with big names like Kreator and Biohazard in Belgium.

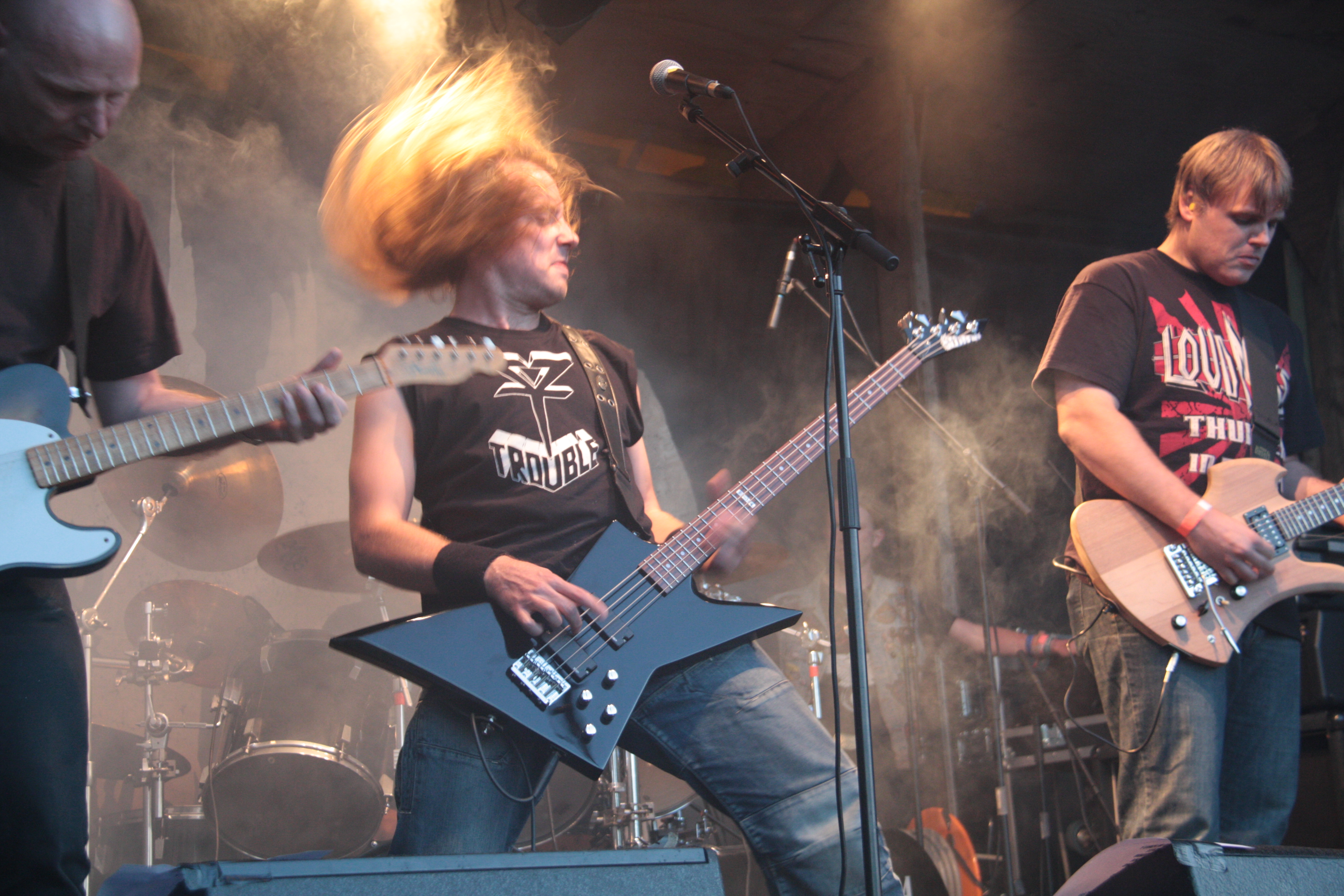
Dead Head at Occultfest 2010

Kill Division, Dead Head's third album was put together in the original line-up as they began in 1989.

It took a lot of time to write a sequel to Kill Division. The recording of their fourth album, Haatland, began in 2004 and the album was released in 2005.

The band began writing songs for new material in 2007 while doing only a few shows in the Netherlands. In 2008 they signed a record deal with the label Displeased Records. In April 2012 Dead Head announced the returning of the original frontman Tom van Dijk.

== Band members ==
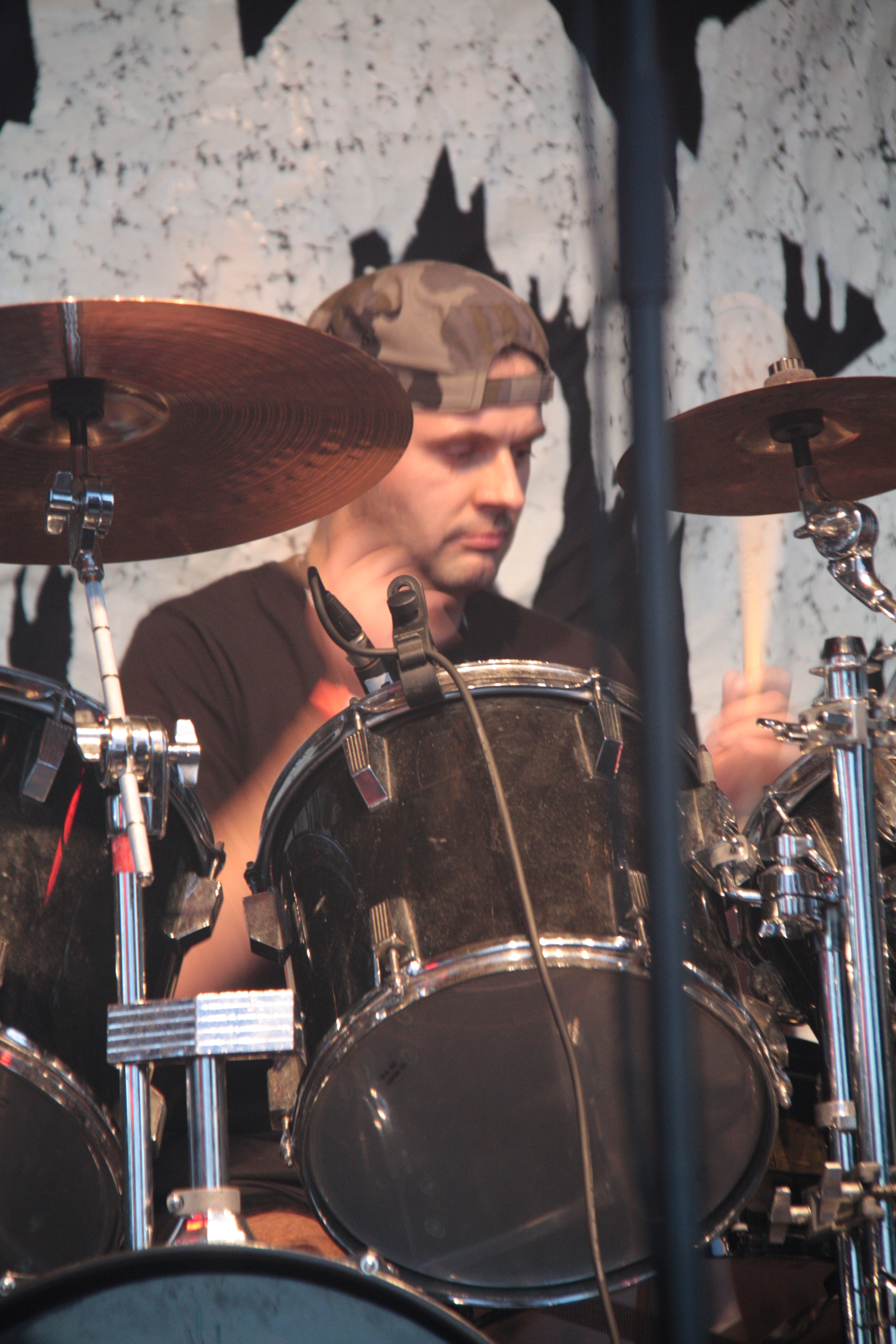
Hans Spijker at Occultfest 2010

Current members

- Ralph de Boer – bass guitar, lead vocals (2008–2011, 2021–present)
- Ronnie van der Wey – guitar (1989–present)
- Robbie Woning – guitar (1989–present)
- Hans Spijker – drums (1989–1992, 1995–present)

Former members

- Tom van Dijk – bass guitar, lead vocals (1989–1999, 2003–2008, 2012–2021)
- Marco Kleinnibbelink – drums (1992–1995)
- Michiel Dekker – bass guitar, lead vocals (1999–2002)
- Johan Wesdijk - vocals (2003-2004)
- Alex Geerts - bass (2003-2004)

== Discography ==
Albums

- 1991 – The Feast Begins at Dawn (Bad Taste Recordings)
- 1993 – Dream Deceiver (Bad Taste Recordings)
- 1999 – Kill Division (Cold Blood Industries)
- 2005 – Haatland (Extremity/GMR Music Group)
- 2009 – Depression Tank (Displeased Records)
  - 2025 – Repression Tank (Hammerheart Records re-release)
- 2017 – Swine Plague (Hammerheart Records)
- 2022 – Slave Driver (Hammerheart Records)

EPs

- 2004 – Dog God (Fadeless Records)
- 2019 – The Shark Tapes (Hammerheart Records)
- 2024 – Shadow Soul (Hammerheart Records)

Compilations

- 2000 – Come To Salem (Hammerheart/Unveiling The Wicked)
- 2019 – The Festering (Hammerheart Records)
- 2020 – Retrospect (self-released)

Demos

- 1989 – Double Live Tape
- 1990 – The Festering
