= Mirliton =

Mirliton may refer to:

- Mirliton (military), a tall hat worn by hussars and other light cavalrymen in the 18th century
- Chayote, a pear-shaped vegetable or its vine
- Eunuch flute, a musical instrument
- Mirliton, a comic book cat character created by Raymond Macherot and Raoul Cauvin
- Le Mirliton, a Paris cabaret opened in 1885 by Aristide Bruant
