= Hussards de la Mort =

French light cavalry company (1792–1793)

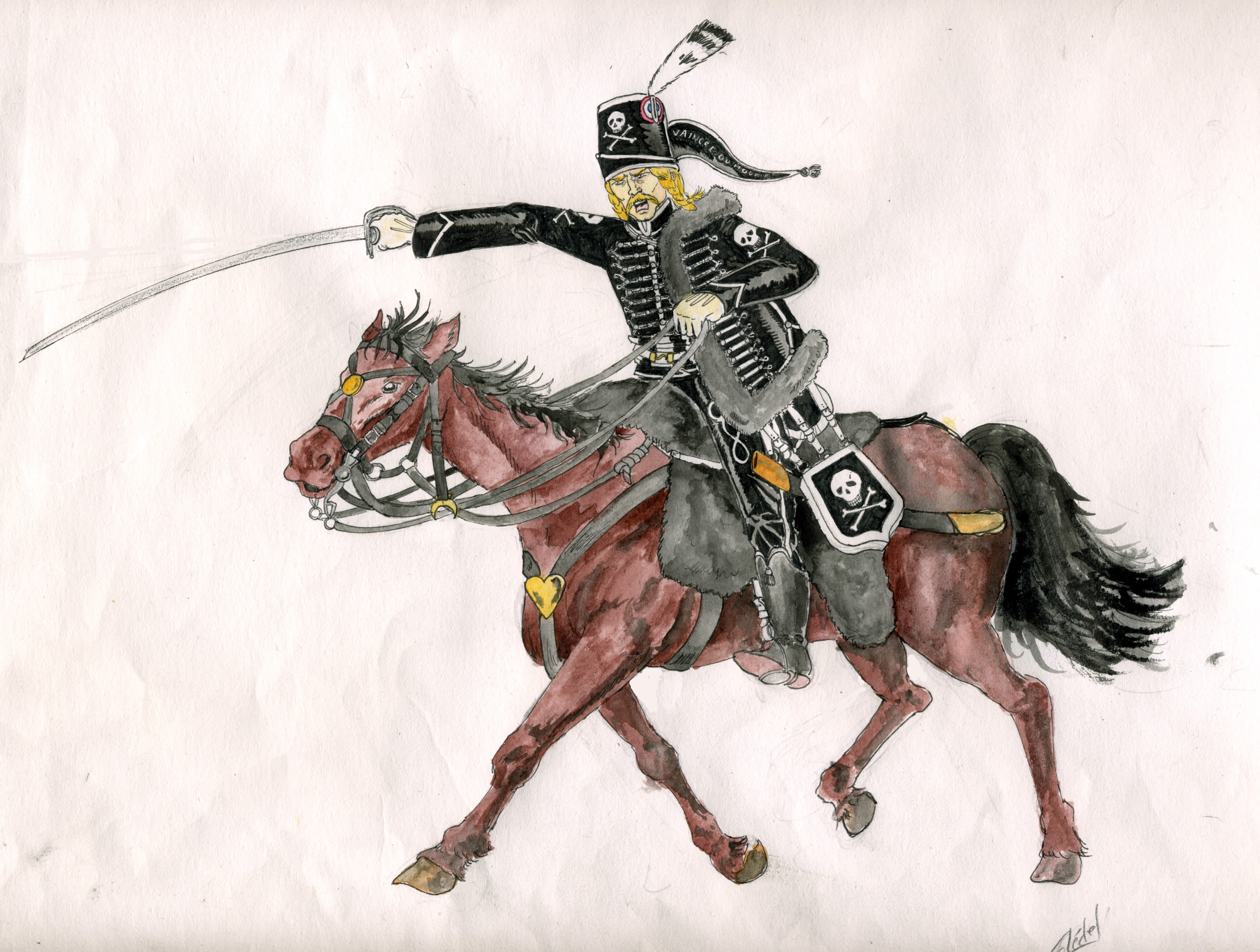
- Active: June 12, 1792; April 25, 1793
- Country: France
- Allegiance: French Revolutionary Army
- Branch: Army of the North
- Size: Company, 200
- Mottos: Vaincre ou mourir, La liberté ou la mort, and Vivre libre ou mourir - Victory or death, Freedom or death, Live free or die
- Black: Black
- Mascot: Skull and crossbones
- Engagements: French Revolutionary Wars: Battle of Valmy; Battle of Fleurus (1794)

The Hussards de la Mort or Death Hussars were a French light cavalry company formed during the French Revolution.

== History ==
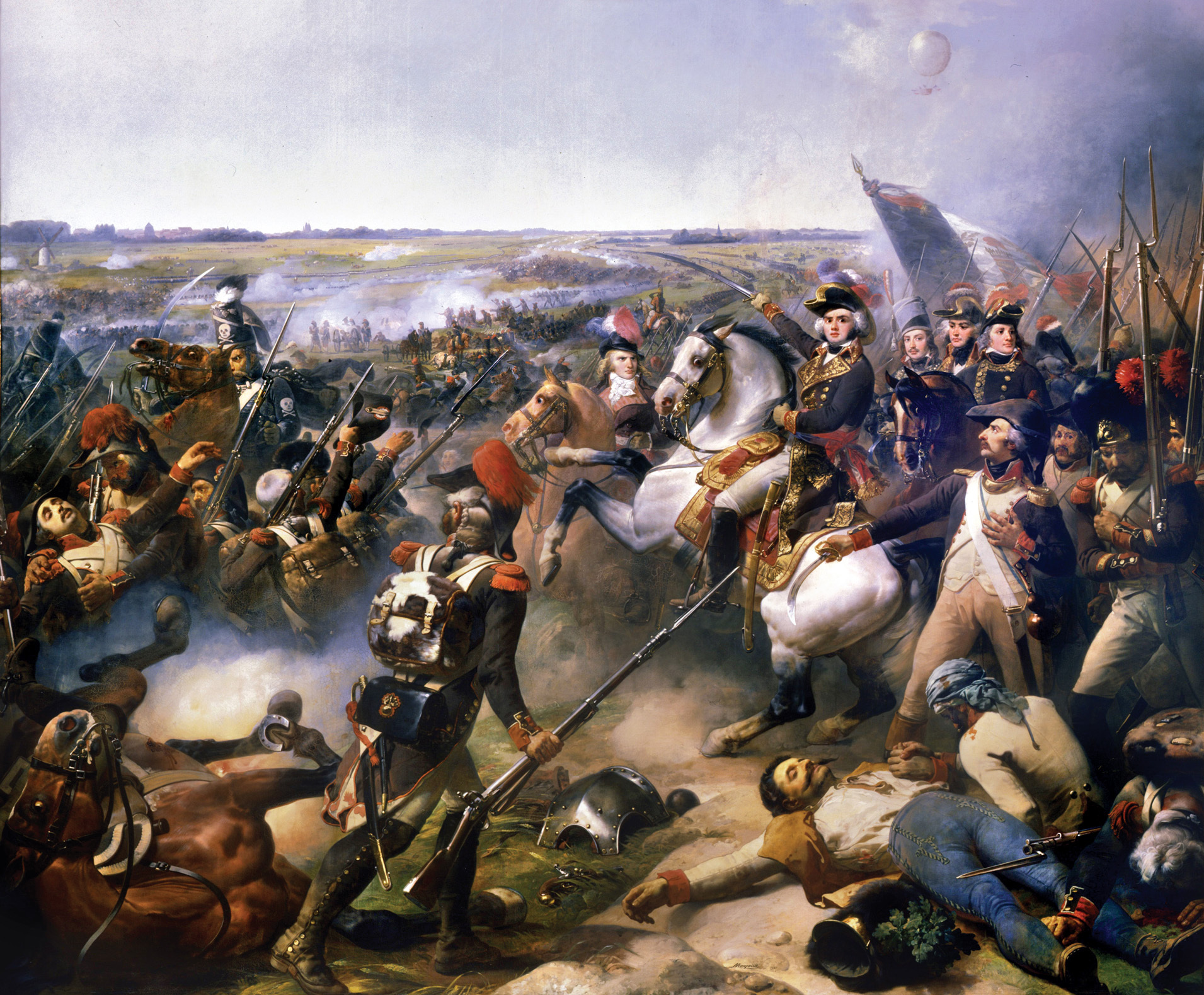
A regimental soldier at the Battle of Fleurus

On June 12, 1792 a squadron was created by the French Assembly formed from 200 volunteers. In July, Kellermann organizes the company naming Hussards de la Mort - Death Hussars. These volunteers, coming from mostly wealthy families, were provided with horses from the King's stables.

On March 5, 1793 survivors of the squadron were merged into the 14th Cavalry Regiment by decree from the National Convention.

On April 25, 1793 the squadron was dissolved.

== Uniform ==
- Mirliton: black
- Collar: black
- Dolman: black
- Pelisse: black
- Facing : black
- Braids: white
- Breeches : black

The symbol of a skull and crossbones was placed on the mirliton, the sabretache and the shoulder sleeve. The uniform was inspired by the insignia of the Prussian hussars. Even after merging with the 14th Cavalry Regiment, they kept their uniform.

== Mottos ==
Vaincre ou mourir, La liberté ou la mort ou Vivre libre ou mourir - Victory or death, Freedom or death, Live free or die

== Theaters of operation ==
- Battle of Valmy
- Battle of Fleurus (1794)

== See also ==
- French cavalry regiments
- French hussar regiments
