= Punisher skull =

Cultural symbol derived from Marvel Comics

Publication information
- Publisher: Marvel Comics
- First appearance: The Amazing Spider-Man #129
- Created by: John Romita Sr.; Ross Andru

In story information
- Type: Emblem
- Element of stories featuring: Punisher

The Punisher skull is a chest emblem associated with the Marvel Comics character the Punisher, a vigilante who wages a one-man war on crime outside legal institutions. Created by writer Gerry Conway and artists John Romita Sr. and Ross Andru, the stylized human skull first appeared in The Amazing Spider-Man #129 in February 1974.

The symbol has antecedents in the Totenkopf, a skull-and-crossbones insignia historically associated with Prussian cavalry and later the SS during the Third Reich.

Beginning in the early 2000s, the skull gained prominence within the United States military during the Iraq War, notably by SEAL Team 3 under Chris Kyle, before spreading to law enforcement agencies across the United States and internationally. Police use attracted sustained criticism, with documented cases involving departments in Milwaukee, Kentucky, St. Louis, and Detroit, as well as forces in Australia, Canada, and Israel. The symbol was also adopted by far-right political movements, appearing at the 2017 Unite the Right rally and prominently during the 2021 United States Capitol attack, and was associated with former Philippine President Rodrigo Duterte.

Conway, actor Jon Bernthal (who portrayed the character in the Marvel Cinematic Universe), and writer Garth Ennis have each publicly condemned the skull's appropriation, arguing that its use by police or vigilante movements contradicts the character's identity as a figure in opposition to institutional authority. In June 2020, Conway launched the "Skulls for Justice" fundraising campaign, which raised approximately $77,000 for Black Lives Matter Los Angeles.

In 2022, Marvel Comics replaced the original skull with an oni-inspired redesign, connecting the change explicitly to real-world controversies, before restoring the original logo in Punisher: Red Band #1 in September 2025. The skull's original design is not a registered trademark, complicating efforts by Marvel and Disney to restrict unauthorized commercial use.

== Origins ==
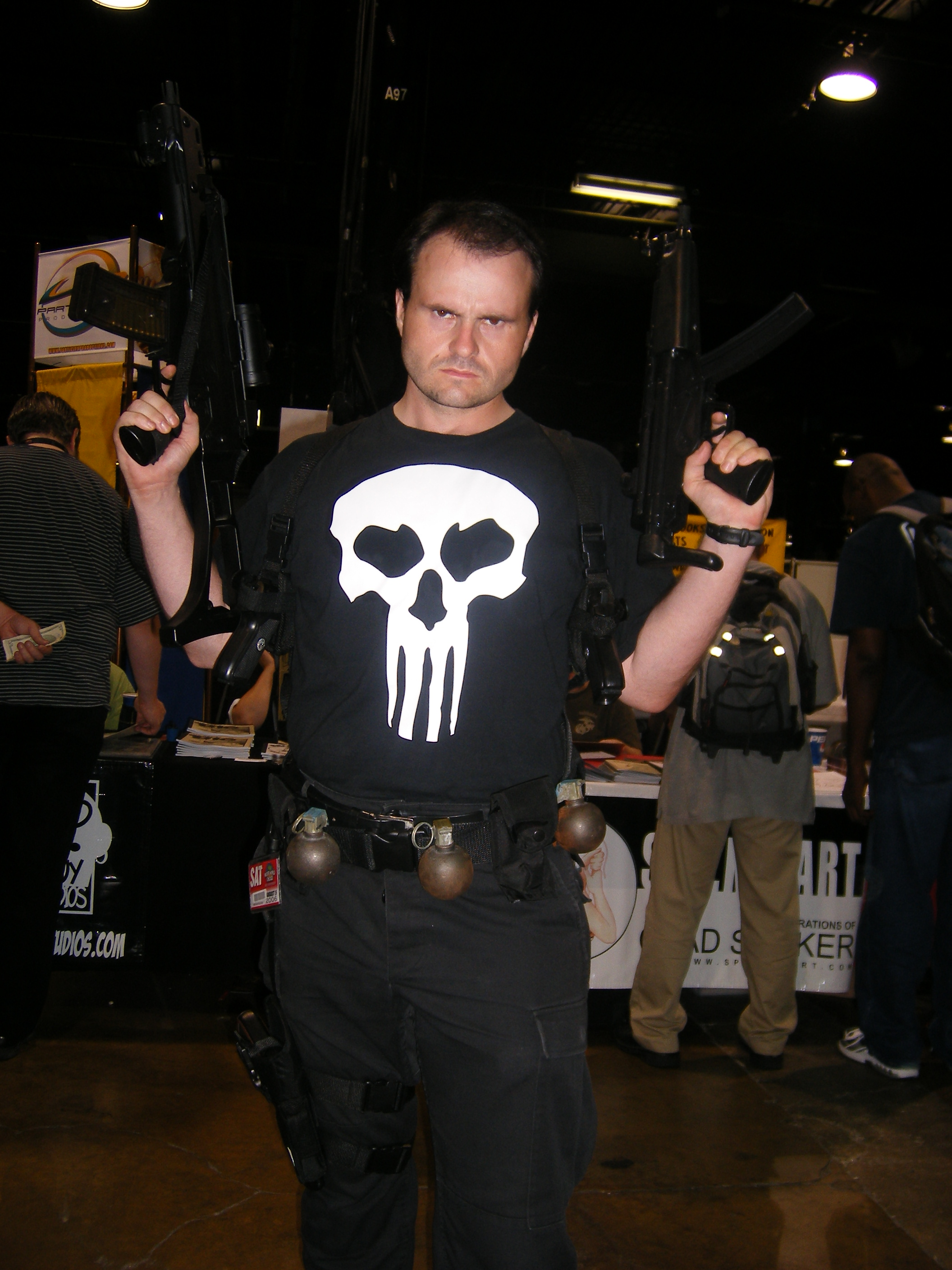
Cosplayer at Wizard World Chicago (2006)

The skull insignia was created by writer Gerry Conway alongside artists John Romita Sr. and Ross Andru as the chest emblem of the Punisher, a vigilante who wages a one-man war on crime outside legal institutions.

The symbol has antecedents in the Totenkopf ("death's head"), a skull-and-crossbones insignia used by Prussian hussar cavalry regiments before being adopted by the SS during the Third Reich, including units that administered Nazi concentration camps. ArtNet News journalist Sarah Cascone drew the comparison directly in 2020 reporting on police use of the Punisher skull.

== Military use ==
The Punisher skull became prominent within the U.S. military during the Iraq War. According to Chris Kyle's autobiography American Sniper, members of SEAL Team 3 painted the skull onto their vehicles and equipment during operations in Fallujah as a psychological tactic against enemy combatants. Kyle's adoption of the symbol contributed to its wider circulation within military culture.

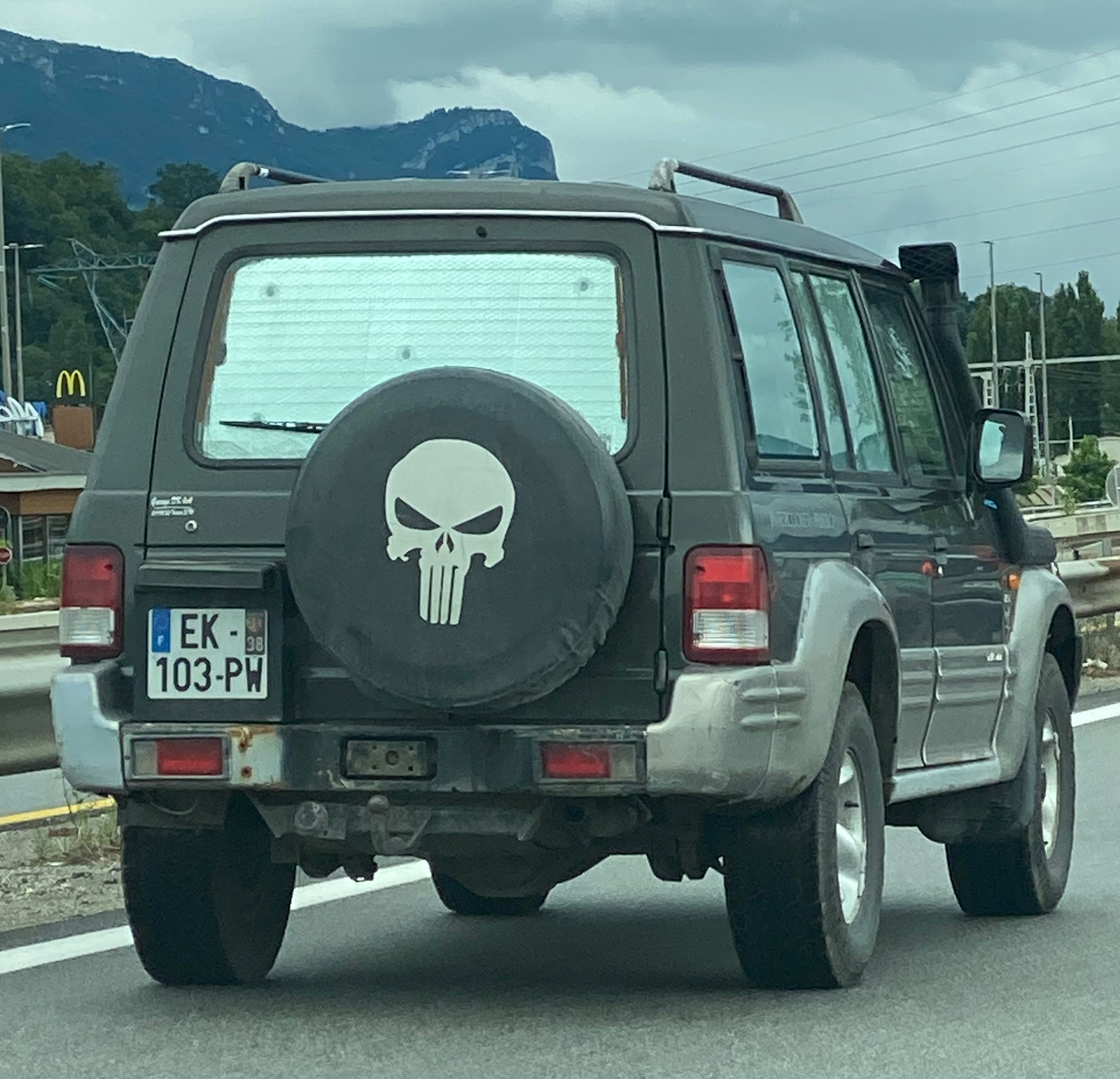
The Punisher skull symbol used on the rear of a motor vehicle

In 2006, photographs circulated on social media showing Iraqi militia members in Baghdad displaying the skull on vehicles and equipment, suggesting the symbol had spread beyond U.S. forces to allied factions in the region. By 2015, journalist Daniele Raineri documented via social media that Iraqi military units fighting ISIL were displaying the Punisher skull on vehicles and uniforms. Middle East analyst Aymenn Jawad Al-Tamimi, cited in the same TIME report, noted the skull's presence among various armed factions in the conflict.

The skull has appeared within the Israel Defense Forces (IDF) as well. +972 Magazine reported in October 2021 on testimony from Ori Givati of the organization Breaking the Silence, who described soldiers displaying the emblem; the IDF issued a statement in response. The Forward reported separately that historian Avner Wishnitzer had been detained after publicly criticizing the symbol's use, and included a statement from an IDF spokesperson. In March 2022, a gunman who killed two people in Hadera during an Islamic State-linked attack was photographed wearing the skull. Haaretz published two articles on the incident: the first noted the symbol's history in the IDF and cited scholar Abraham Riesman on its cultural trajectory; the second reported on Conway's response, drawn from a Zoom interview.

In April 2018, Australian Chief of Army General Angus Campbell issued a directive prohibiting Australian Army personnel from displaying what he called "death symbology and iconography", citing the Punisher skull by name. The directive drew criticism from veterans in open letters; one point of contention was a photograph of decorated soldier Cameron Baird VC, who had been photographed with the skull before his death in action. The Royal Australian Air Force was excluded from the directive's scope, creating an inconsistency across the services. Academic commentary published in The Conversation argued the ban was about professional military conduct rather than political censorship. The Pentagon did not publicly respond to questions about equivalent U.S. policies.

== United States law enforcement ==
One of the earliest documented cases of law enforcement use of the skull in the United States involved a group of Milwaukee Police Department officers who called themselves the "Punishers". The group's existence was disclosed during a 2007 sentencing hearing for a former officer. The group was linked to the beating of Frank Jude Jr. Subsequent reporting in 2011 documented the group's continued existence and activities.

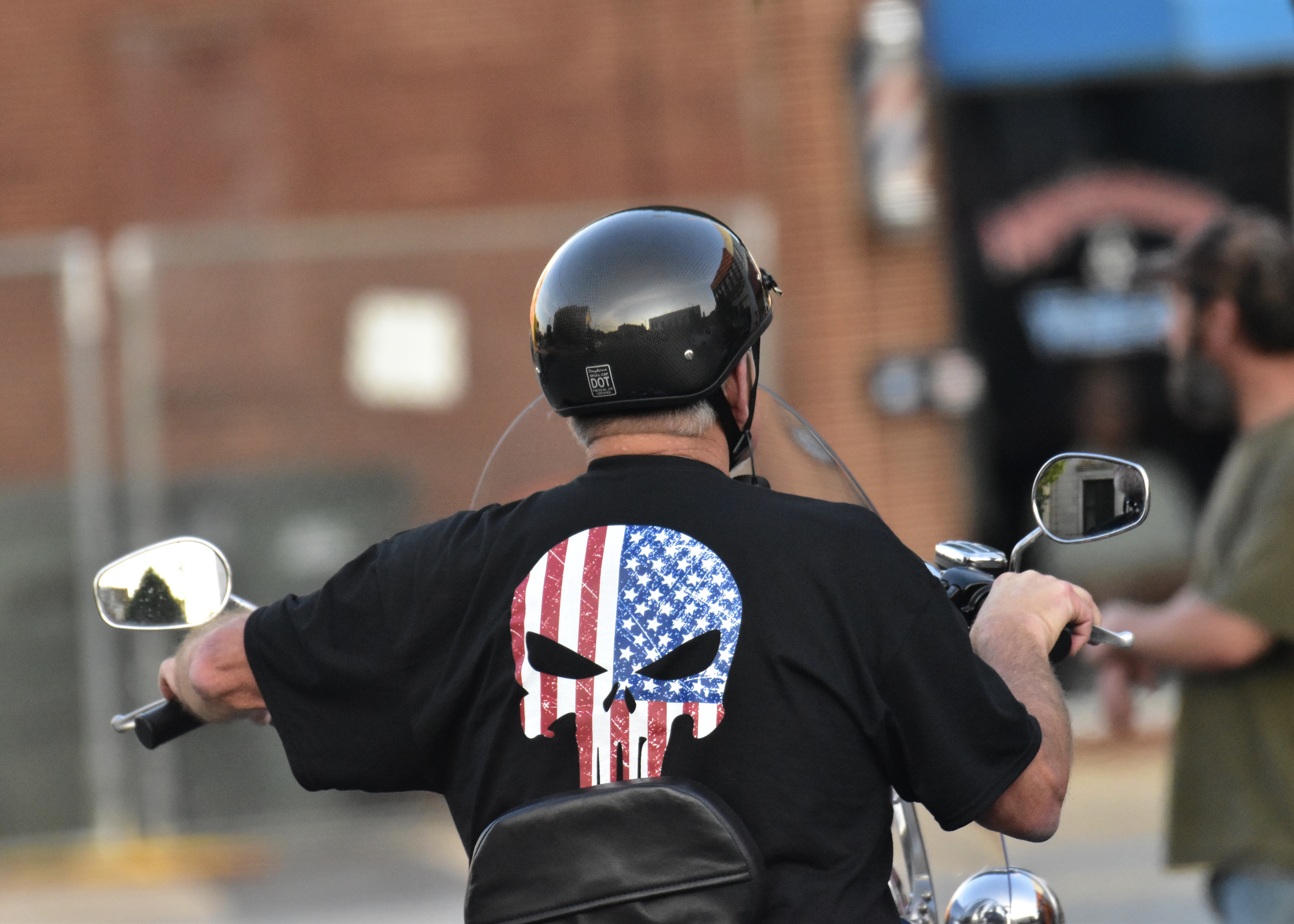
The Punisher skull symbol appearing in the colors and design of the United States flag during the Confederate Response to Juneteenth in Graham, North Carolina, in 2020

In early 2017, the city of Catlettsburg, Kentucky came under national attention after its police department applied Punisher skull decals, combined with a Blue Lives Matter design, to patrol vehicles following city council approval. After public criticism, Police Chief Cameron Logan announced the department would remove the decals. Military publication Task & Purpose published commentary questioning whether law enforcement should identify with a fictional vigilante who operates outside legal constraints.

In 2019, the St. Louis Police Officers' Association attracted scrutiny after officers were found to have posted far-right and white nationalist content on social media, including the Punisher skull alongside other imagery. St. Louis Police Commissioner John Hayden Jr. subsequently circulated an internal memo addressing officer use of the skull.

During the George Floyd protests in 2020, photographs circulated on social media showing Detroit Police Department officers displaying the Punisher skull on their equipment and vehicles. ArtNet News reported on the photographs, noted their connection to the Totenkopf tradition, and included commentary from Punisher co-creator Gerry Conway.

== Political and far-right use ==
=== Philippines ===
Rodrigo Duterte, who served as President of the Philippines from 2016 to 2022, acquired the nickname "The Punisher" while serving as mayor of Davao City, where he oversaw anti-crime campaigns attributed to the extrajudicial Davao Death Squad. The nickname was reportedly first used by Time magazine in 2002, predating the widespread real-world adoption of the character's visual symbol. Duterte was later transferred to the International Criminal Court to face charges related to his administration's anti-drug campaign.

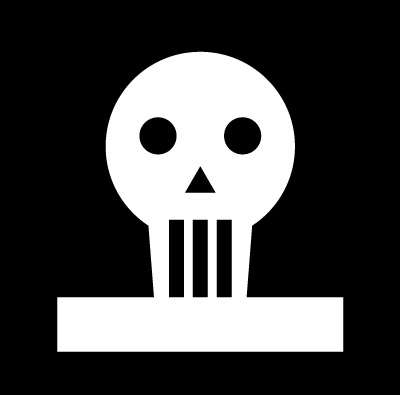
Modified punisher skull used by protesters at the 2017 Unite the Right rally in Charlottesville, Virginia

=== United States ===
At the 2017 Unite the Right rally in Charlottesville, Virginia, researchers from the Anti-Defamation League documented participants displaying a skull variant associated with the Punisher. In January 2018, Conway and actor Jon Bernthal, who portrayed the Punisher in the Marvel Cinematic Universe, publicly condemned the appropriation of the skull by white nationalists. Inverse subsequently traced far-right use of the symbol from the Charlottesville rally through the 2021 United States Capitol attack.

On January 6, 2021, participants in the 2021 United States Capitol attack were widely photographed displaying Punisher skull imagery on clothing, patches, helmets, and flags. The visibility of the symbol prompted calls for Marvel and Disney to pursue trademark enforcement against unauthorized use. Thin Blue Line USA, a merchandise company that had sold a "Punisher Collection" of law enforcement-themed products, announced in an email on January 7 that it was discontinuing the line, citing copyright concerns. A Toronto police officer was separately photographed wearing a Punisher skull patch during this period, drawing commentary in Canadian press about the skull's adoption by law enforcement outside the United States.

In October 2025, FBI Director Kash Patel distributed challenge coins to FBI agents featuring the Punisher skull, reigniting debate about the symbol. The Daily Beast reported on the coins and included a social media post by journalist Ken Dilanian drawing attention to the design. Attorney Aaron Reichlin-Melnick cited Conway's 2019 public statements in response to the coin's release. The Patel controversy coincided with Marvel's restoration of the original skull logo in Punisher: Red Band #1 that same month.

== Creator, writer, and actor responses ==
Conway, the Punisher's co-creator, publicly criticized the skull's adoption by law enforcement and far-right groups since at least 2017. He compared police officers displaying the skull to displaying the Confederate battle flag—a symbol whose meaning, he argued, had been transformed by those who chose to use it. Conway argued that a police officer displaying the skull misunderstands the character, who exists in opposition to institutional authority rather than in support of it. In June 2020, following the murder of George Floyd and the subsequent protests, Conway launched a fundraising campaign called "Skulls for Justice" in which artists redesigned the Punisher skull to incorporate Black Lives Matter themes. The campaign raised approximately $45,000 within its first two weeks and ultimately raised approximately $77,000, donated to the Black Lives Matter Los Angeles chapter. In January 2022, Conway stated he still believed the symbol could be reclaimed from extremist associations.

Actor Jon Bernthal, who portrayed the Punisher in the Marvel Cinematic Universe, condemned the appropriation of the skull by white nationalists following the Charlottesville rally in 2017. Bernthal again commented on the symbol's appropriation after the January 6, 2021 Capitol attack, when he posted on X that those displaying the skull were "misguided and lost" and had nothing to do with the character. Writer Garth Ennis, whose run on Punisher defined the character's modern iteration, told SYFY Wire that nobody actually wants to be the Punisher since the character is defined by trauma and loss, not power.

== Marvel's logo redesign (2022) ==
In December 2021 and March 2022, Marvel Comics announced and debuted a redesigned logo for the Punisher in writer Jason Aaron's new series, replacing the classic skull with a stylized symbol drawn from the oni, a demon figure in Japanese mythology. Marvel filed a trademark application for the replacement design. Marvel editor-in-chief C. B. Cebulski and Aaron both issued statements connecting the redesign to the symbol's real-world controversies. Fan response was mixed; some critics argued the change was an overreaction to fringe misuse of the original.

Philosopher A. G. Holdier, writing for the Prindle Institute for Ethics, analyzed the change through Wittgenstein's theory of meaning-as-use, arguing that a symbol's meaning is determined by the community that employs it, not its original creators.

The original skull logo was restored in Punisher: Red Band #1, written by Benjamin Percy with a cover by Marco Checchetto, published in September 2025.

== Scholarly analysis ==
Benjamin Linzy, a doctoral candidate at Marquette University, published an analysis in the Activist History Review in 2020 tracing the skull's adoption by police and militia groups, situating it within American punitive political culture. Linzy also cited Anti-Defamation League documentation of the skull's use by the Oath Keepers militia.

A 2019 storyline written by Matthew Rosenberg addressed the controversy within the comics: in The Punisher Vol. 12 #13, the title character directly confronted police officers wearing his symbol.

== Trademark and legal status ==
The Punisher skull as originally drawn is not a registered trademark, which has complicated Marvel and Disney's ability to restrict its commercial use. Marvel and Disney pursued lawsuits against unauthorized manufacturers of Punisher skull merchandise beginning around 2015. The 2022 oni-inspired replacement design was submitted for trademark registration.
