= Totenkopf =

German symbol for skull and crossbones

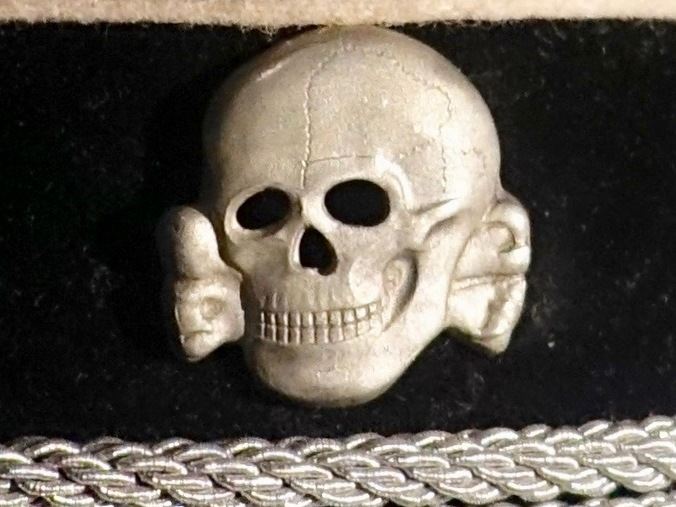
A Totenkopf on a Nazi SS uniform

Totenkopf (German: [ˈtoːtn̩ˌkɔpf]) is a German compound word for "death's head" or "dead person's head". The word is often used to denote a particular design of a symbol common in Western culture, consisting of a human skull – usually frontal, more rarely in profile with or without the mandible. In English, the term is associated with Nazi Germany, where the skull insignia was used as a uniform emblem of the SS. Similar symbols are known as skull and crossbones and have been used by several military forces.

== Etymology ==
Toten-Kopf translates literally to "head of the dead". Semantically, it refers to a skull, which in German is a Schädel. As a compound term, Totenkopf connotes the human skull as a symbol, typically one with crossed thigh bones as part of a grouping.

== German military ==
=== Prussia ===
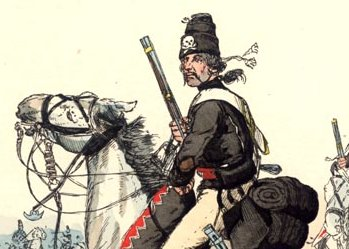
Hussar from Husaren-Regiment Nr. 5 (von Ruesch) in 1744 with the Totenkopf on the mirliton (Ger. Flügelmütze)

Use of the Totenkopf in Germany as a military emblem began under Frederick the Great, who formed a regiment of Hussar cavalry in the Prussian army commanded by Colonel von Ruesch, the Husaren-Regiment Nr. 5 (von Ruesch). It adopted a black uniform with a Totenkopf emblazoned on the front of its mirlitons and wore it on the field in the War of Austrian Succession and in the Seven Years' War. The Totenkopf remained a part of the uniform when the regiment was reformed into Leib-Husaren Regiments Nr.1 and Nr.2 in 1808. The symbol was then granted 3 years later to the Spanish Army's 8th Light Cavalry Regiment "Lusitania", who were nicknamed "Los Dragones de la Muerte" (the Dragons of Death) and were granted use of the skull after the infamous Battle of Madonna dell'Olmo in 1744, where they suffered great casualties.

=== Brunswick ===
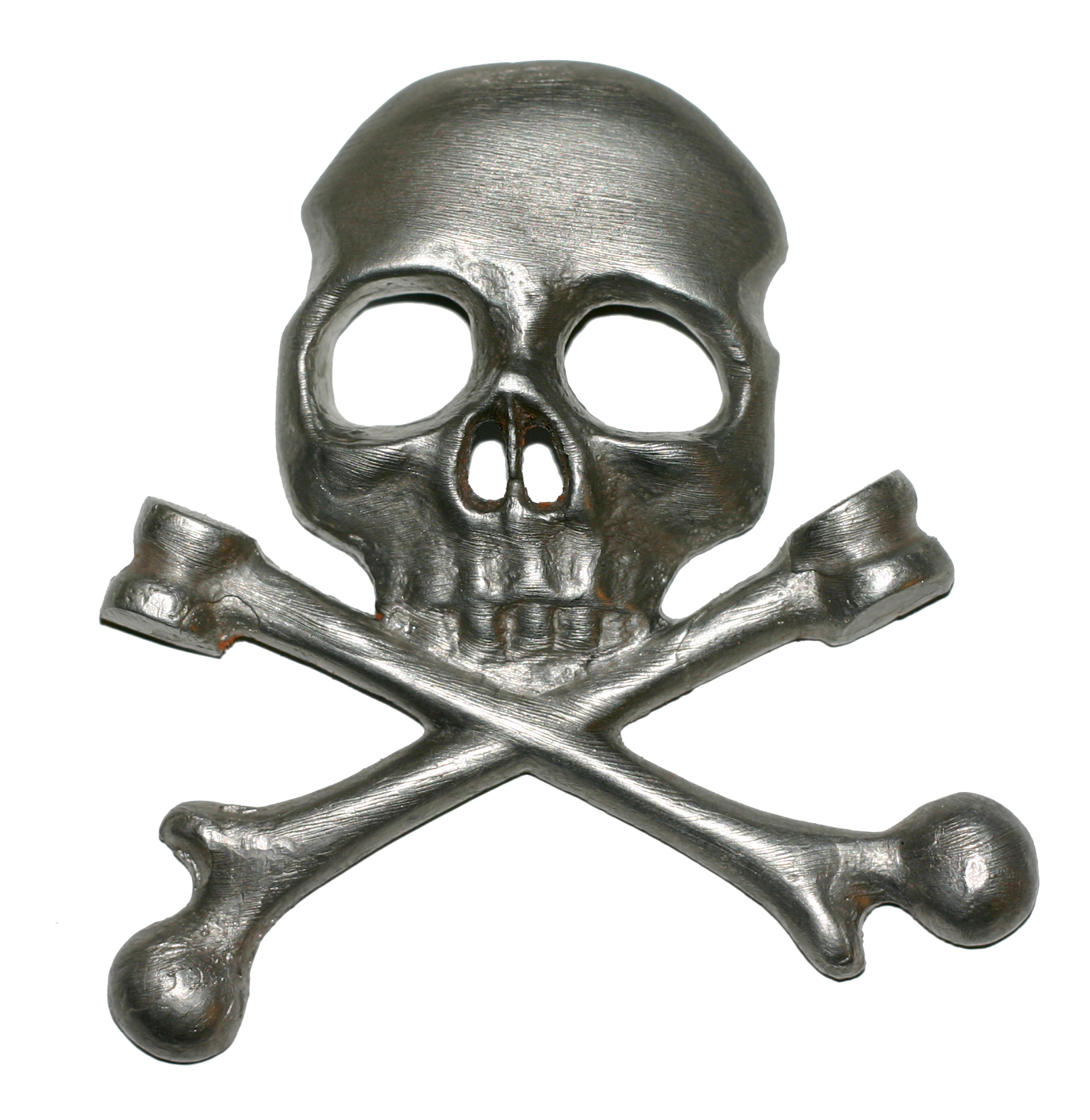
Totenkopf badge worn by the Brunswick Leibbataillon ("Life-Guard Battalion") at the Battle of Waterloo in 1815

In 1809, during the War of the Fifth Coalition, Frederick William, Duke of Brunswick-Wolfenbüttel raised a force of volunteers to fight Napoleon Bonaparte, who had conquered the Duke's lands. The Brunswick Corps was provided with black uniforms, giving rise to their nickname, the Black Brunswickers. Both hussar cavalry and infantry in the force wore a Totenkopf badge, either in mourning for the duke's father, Charles William Ferdinand, Duke of Brunswick-Wolfenbüttel, who had been killed at the Battle of Jena–Auerstedt in 1806, or according to some sources, as a sign of revenge against the French. After fighting their way through Germany, the Black Brunswickers entered British service and fought with them in the Peninsular War and at the Battle of Waterloo. The Brunswick corps was eventually incorporated into the Prussian Army in 1866.

=== German Empire ===
German Empire era Totenkopf

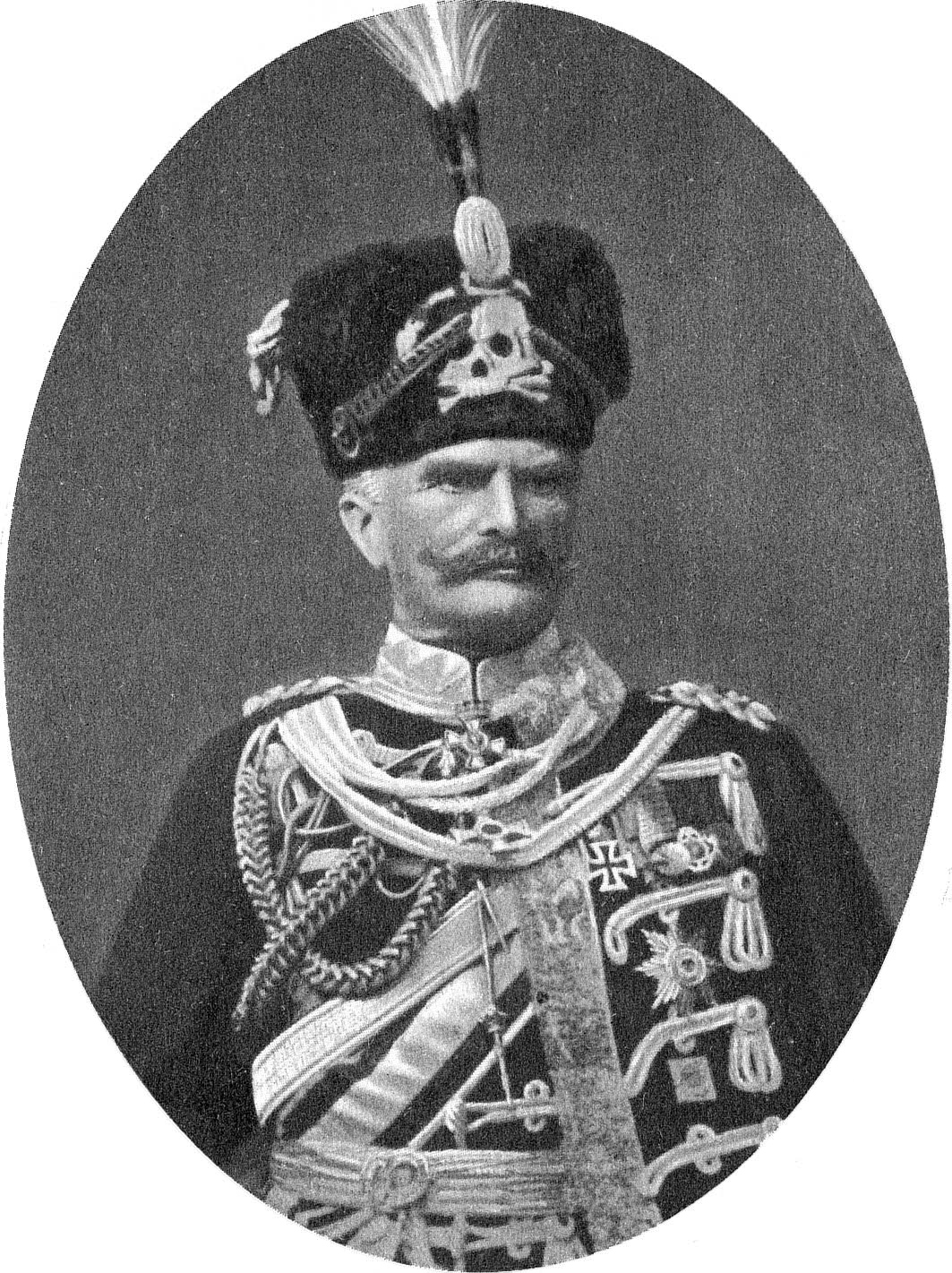
August von Mackensen, German field marshal in his Life Hussar full dress, with the Totenkopf on his fur busby c. 1915

The skull continued to be used by the Prussian and Brunswick armed forces until 1918, and some of the stormtroopers that led the last German offensives on the Western Front in 1918 used skull badges. Luftstreitkräfte fighter pilots Georg von Hantelmann and Kurt Adolf Monnington are just two of a number of Central Powers military pilots who used the Totenkopf as their personal aircraft insignia.

=== Weimar Republic ===
The Totenkopf was used in Germany throughout the interwar period, most prominently by the Freikorps. In 1933, it was in use by the regimental staff and the 1st, 5th, and 11th squadrons of the Reichswehr's 5th Cavalry Regiment as a continuation of a tradition from the Kaiserreich.

Flag of the Iron Division Freikorps (1919)

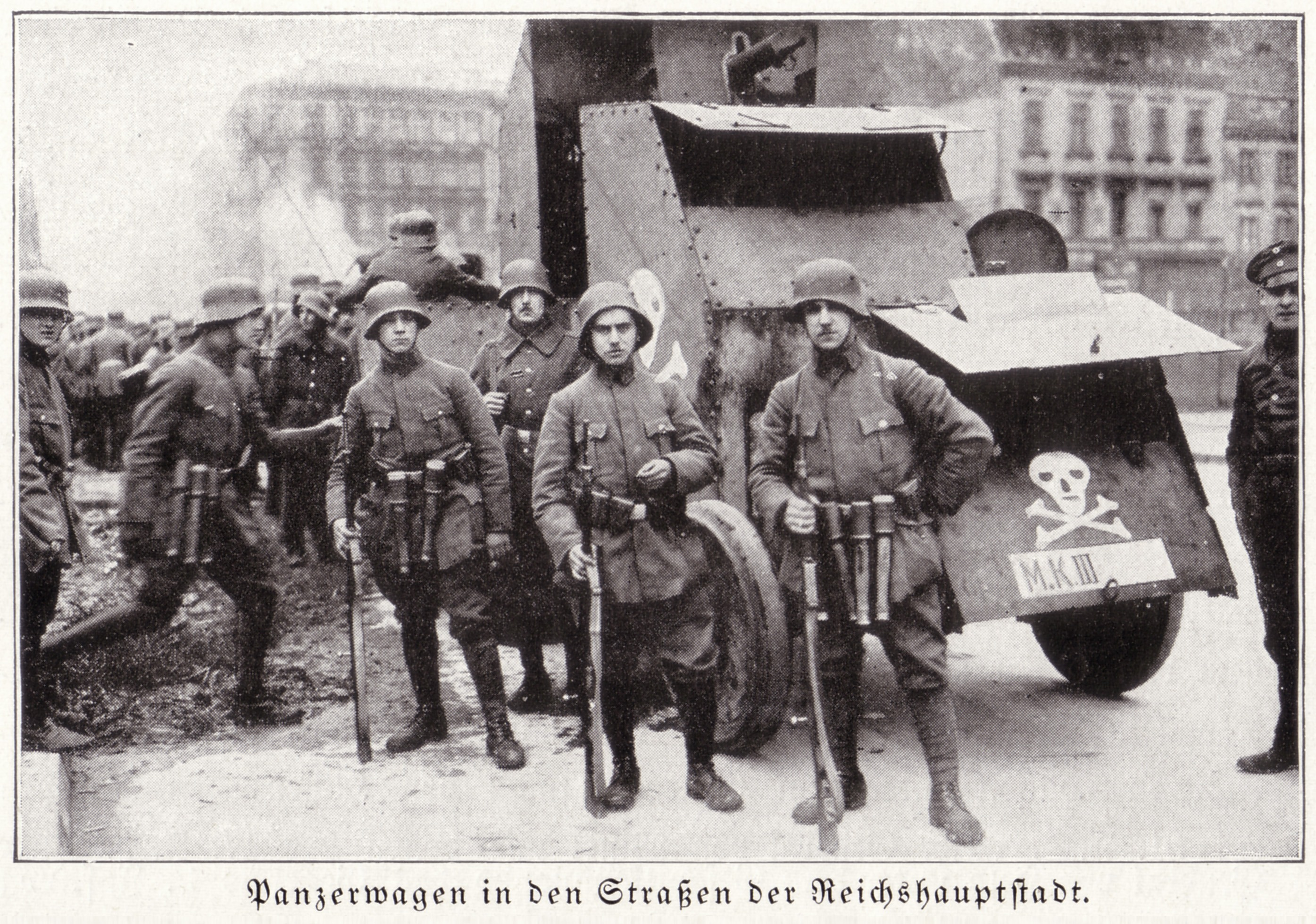
Armed Freikorps troops in Berlin in 1919

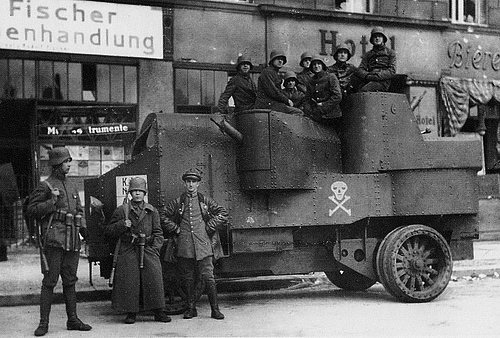
A Garford-Putilov Armoured Car used by the Freikorps in 1919

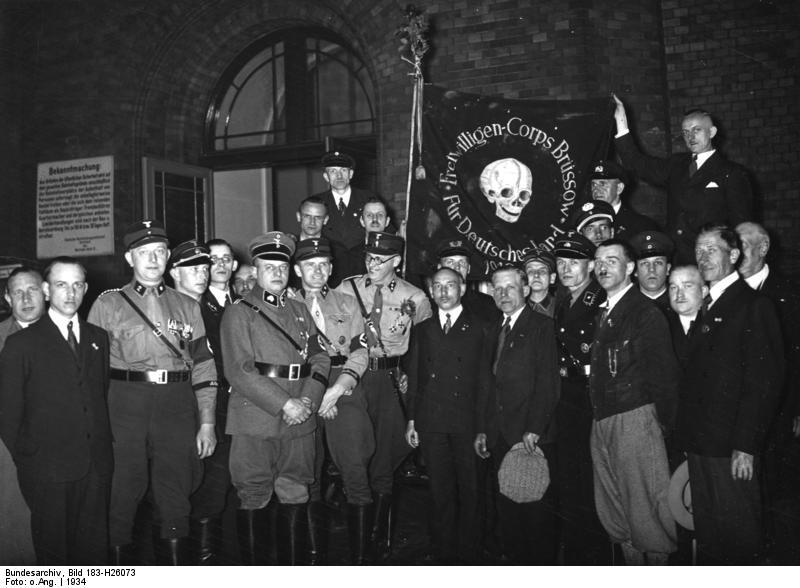
Flag at a meeting of former Brüssow Freikorps members in 1934

=== Nazi Germany ===
In the early days of the Nazi Party, Julius Schreck, the leader of the Stabswache (Adolf Hitler's bodyguard unit), resurrected the use of the Totenkopf as the unit's insignia. This unit grew into the Schutzstaffel (SS), which continued to use the Totenkopf as insignia throughout its history. According to a writing by Reichsführer-SS Heinrich Himmler, the Totenkopf had the following meaning:

The Skull is the reminder that you shall always be willing to put your self at stake for the life of the whole community.

SS-Totenkopfverbände ('Death's Head Units') was the Schutzstaffel (SS) organization responsible for administering the Nazi concentration camps and extermination camps for Nazi Germany, among similar duties. While the Totenkopf was the universal cap badge of the SS, the Death's Head units also wore this insignia on the right collar tab to distinguish itself from other SS formations.

Both the 3rd SS Panzer Division of the Waffen-SS, and the Luftwaffe's 54th Bomber Wing Kampfgeschwader 54 were given the unit name "Totenkopf", and used a similar-looking graphic skull-crossbones insignia as the SS units of the same name. The 3rd SS Panzer Division also had skull patches on their uniform collars instead of the SS sieg rune.

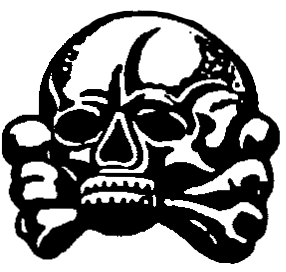
The first version of the SS-Totenkopf; used from 1923 to 1934

The second version of the SS-Totenkopf; used from 1934 to 1945

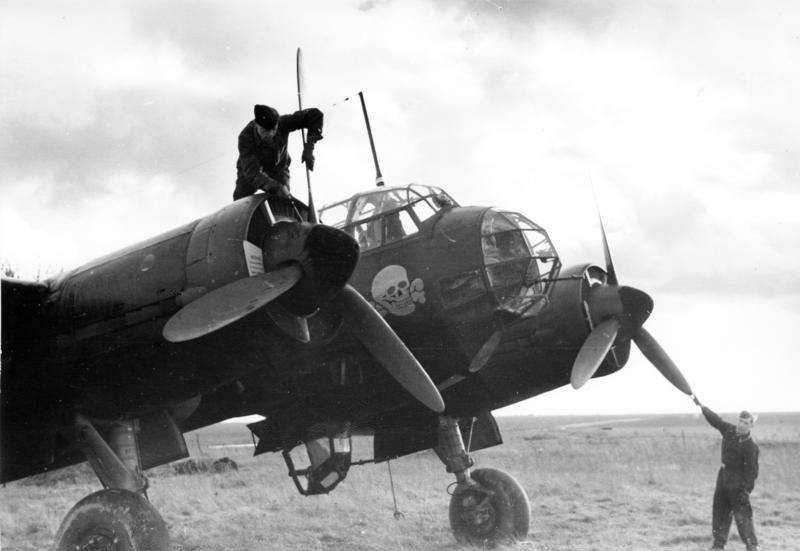
Junkers Ju 88 of Kampfgeschwader 54 (KG 54) in France, November 1940

The "standalone" version of the WW II Luftwaffe KG 54 wing's dead's head unit insignia

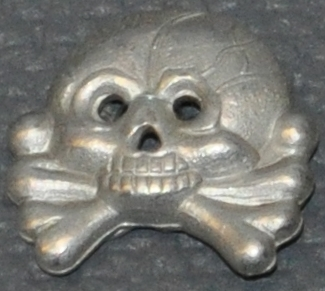
German Panzer Totenkopf

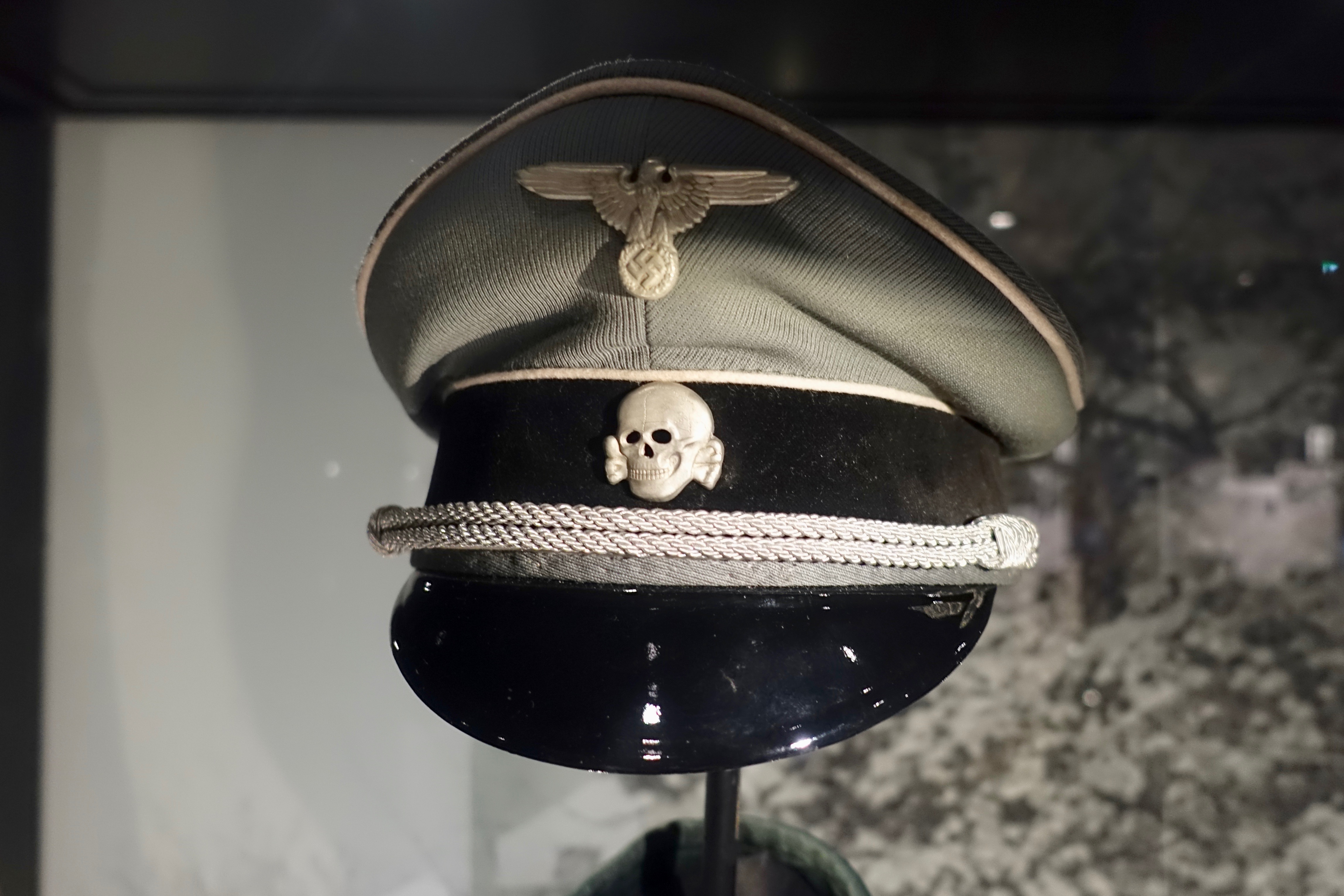
German SS uniform. Peaked visor cap with skull emblem (Totenkopf)

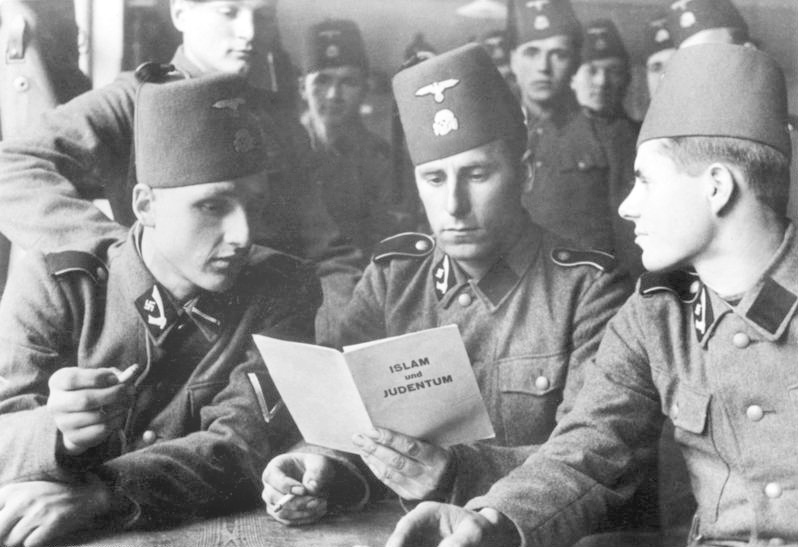
Members of SS Handschar; the SS-Totenkopf was printed on their fez cap.

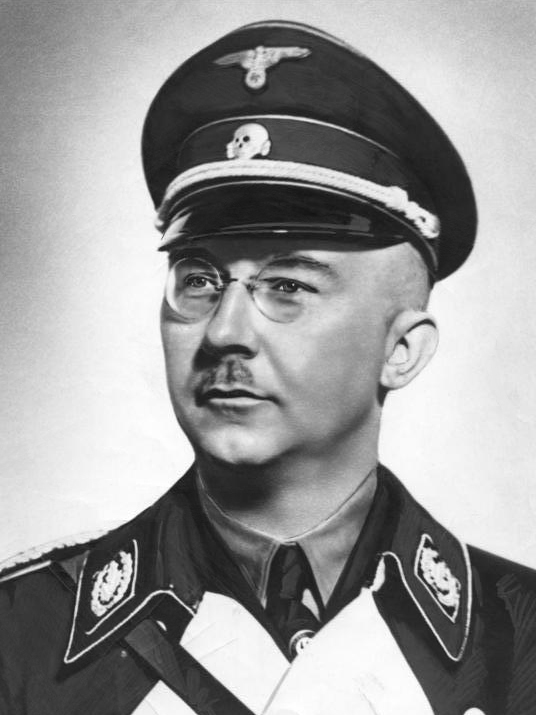
SS Reichsführer Heinrich Himmler with peaked visor cap with Totenkopf.

== Non-German military ==
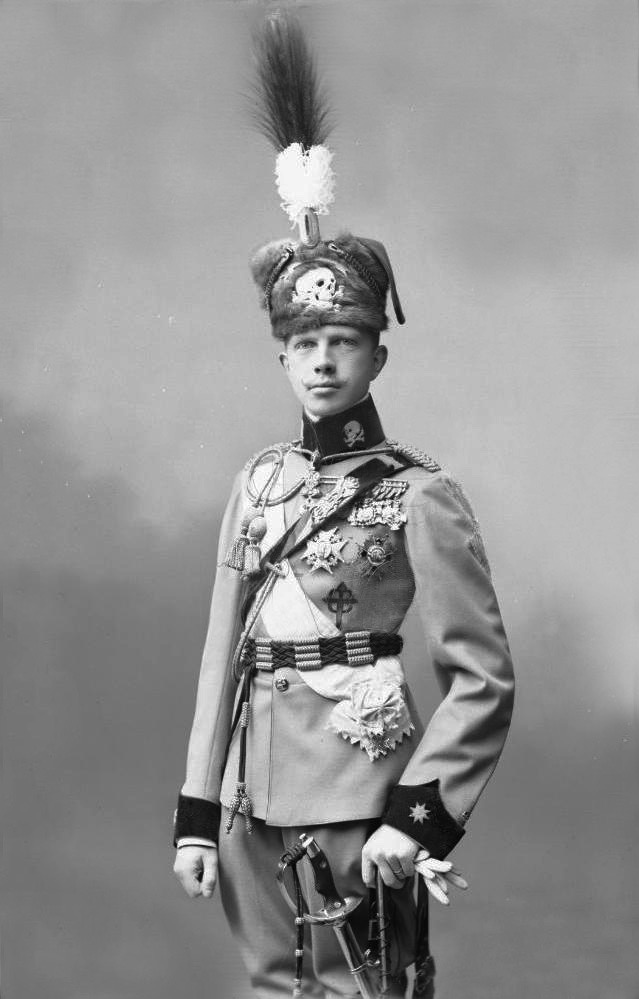
Infante Fernando wearing the uniform of Spain's 8th Light Armoured Cavalry Regiment "Lusitania" in 1915. The Spanish were amongst the first to adopt the symbol in the military after it was earned at the Battle of Madonna dell'Olmo in 1744

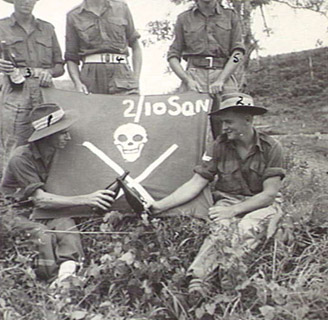
Australian commandos in New Guinea, 1945

- A skull and crossbones has often been a symbol of pirates, especially in the form of the Jolly Roger, but usually having the crossbones below the skull's lower mandibile (if present) rather than behind it, as used by pirate Samuel Bellamy in one example.
- The second oldest usage in a military uniform was that of the Spanish Army's Lusitania Dragoon Regiment, which adopted it in 1744. It included three skull and crossbones in the cuffs, and in 1902 the skull and crossbones insignia was authorized again to replace the regiment number on the sides of the collar.
- It was used as the emblem on the uniforms of Greek revolutionaries of Alexander Ypsilantis' Sacred Band (1821) during the Wallachian uprising of 1821
- Armenian fedayis, during the First World War against the Ottoman Empire, used a skull with two bolt rifles under the words "revenge revenge" in their flags.
- The British Army's Royal Lancers continue to use the skull and crossbones in their emblem, inherited from its use by the 17th Lancers, a unit raised in 1759 following General Wolfe's death in Quebec. The emblem contains an image of a death's head, and the words 'Or Glory', chosen in commemoration of Wolfe.
- In 1792, a regiment of Hussards de la Mort (Death Hussars) was formed during the French Revolution by the French National Assembly and were organized and named by Kellerman. The group of 200 volunteers were from wealthy families and their horses were supplied from the King's Stables. They were formed to defend against various other European states in the wake of the revolution. They participated in the Battle of Valmy and its members also participated in the Battle of Fleurus (1794). They had the following mottos: Vaincre ou mourir, La liberté ou la mort and Vivre libre ou mourir – Victory or death; Freedom or death; and Live free or die.
- Although not exactly a Totenkopf per se, the Chilean guerrilla leader Manuel Rodríguez used the symbol on his elite forces called Husares de la muerte ("Hussars of death"). It is still used by the Chilean Army's 3rd Cavalry Regiment.
- The primarily Prussian 41st Regiment New York Volunteer Infantry (mustered on 6 June 1861; mustered out 9 December 1865) wore a skull insignia.
- The Vengeurs de la Mort ("death avengers"), an irregular unit of Commune de Paris, 1871.
- The Portuguese Army Police 2nd Lancers Regiment use a skull-and-crossbones image in their emblem, similar to the one used by the Queen's Royal Lancers.
- The Kingdom of Sweden's Hussar Regiments wore a death's head emblem in the Prussian Style on the front of the mirleton.
- Ramón Cabrera's regiment adopted in 1838 a skull with crossbones flanked by an olive branch and a sword on a black flag during the Spanish Carlist Wars.
- Serbian Chetniks wore a death's head emblem in several conflicts: guerrilla in Old Serbia, First and Second Balkan Wars, World War I (both defense and resistance) and World War II.
- Some Macedonian-Bulgarian komitas that were members of the Internal Macedonian Revolutionary Organization wore a death's head emblem, usually with crossed revolver and qama below the skull and crossbones (similar to the Serbian ones) throughout the existence of the organization in several conflicts: Macedonian Struggle (Ilinden–Preobrazhenie Uprising, the Balkan Wars), World War I, during the interwar period in Macedonia, Kingdom of Serbs, Croats and Slovenes, and in World War II. The most prominent example being Pitu Guli who wears one in his only known photo, and his son Steryu Gulev.
- The Italian elite storm-troopers of the Arditi used a skull with a dagger between its teeth as a symbol during World War I. Various versions of skulls were also later used by the Italian Fascists.
- The Russian Kornilov's Shock Detachment (8th Army) adopted a death's head emblem in 1917. Then after World War I, the unit became Kornilov's Shock Regiment as a part of the White Russian Volunteer Army during the Russian Civil War. Also a death's head emblem was depicted on 17th Don Cossack regiment and Mariupol 4th Hussar regiment badges of Russian Imperial Army.
- The Estonian Kuperjanov's Partisan Battalion used the skull-and-crossbones as their insignia (since 1918); the Kuperjanov Infantry Battalion continues to use the skull and crossbones as their insignia today.
- Two Polish small cavalry units used death's head emblem during Polish–Ukrainian War and Polish–Soviet War – Dywizjon Jazdy Ochotniczej (also known as Huzarzy Śmierci i.e. Death Hussars) and Poznański Ochotniczy Batalion Śmierci.
- During 1943–1945 the Italian Black Brigades and numerous other forces fighting for the Italian Social Republic wore various versions of skulls on their uniforms, berets, and caps.
- The United States Marine Corps Reconnaissance Battalions use the skull-and-crossbones symbol in their emblem.
- The No. 100 Squadron RAF (Royal Air Force) continued to use a flag depicting a skull and crossbones until it was disbanded in 2022, supposedly in reference to a flag stolen from a French brothel in 1918.
- The Batalhão de Operações Policiais Especiais, a special unit within the military police of Rio de Janeiro state, Brazil, uses the skull emblem to differentiate their team from the regular units.
- South Korea's 3rd Infantry Division (백골부대) have a skull-and-crossbones in their emblem.
- Many United States Cavalry reconnaissance troops or squadrons utilize a skull insignia, often wearing the traditional Stetson hat, and backed by either crossed cavalry sabers, crossed rifles, or some other variation, as an unofficial unit logo. These logos are incorporated into troop T-shirts, challenge coins, or other items designed to enhance morale and esprit de corps.
- A version of the Punisher skull symbol has been used by U.S. military personnel since the Iraq War.
- Members of the Azov Regiment of the Ukrainian National Guard have used the totenkopf.
- 72nd Mechanized Brigade of Ukrainian Ground Forces have a skull in their emblem.
- The skull and crosshair were the main symbol of the Wagner Group until it was merged with the Rosgvardiya.

=== Gallery ===
==== Flags ====
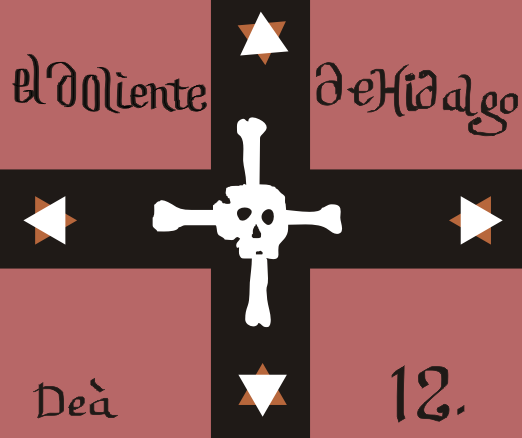
Flag used from 1811 to 1812 by Regimiento de la muerte (Death Regiment) after Hidalgo's death in the Mexican War of Independence

One of the flags used by Argentine caudillo Facundo Quiroga, "Rn.o M." means "Religion or Death" (1825-1834)

Spanish Carlist flag (1838)

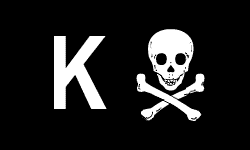
Flag used by Filipino revolutionary general Mariano Llanera (1896–1899)

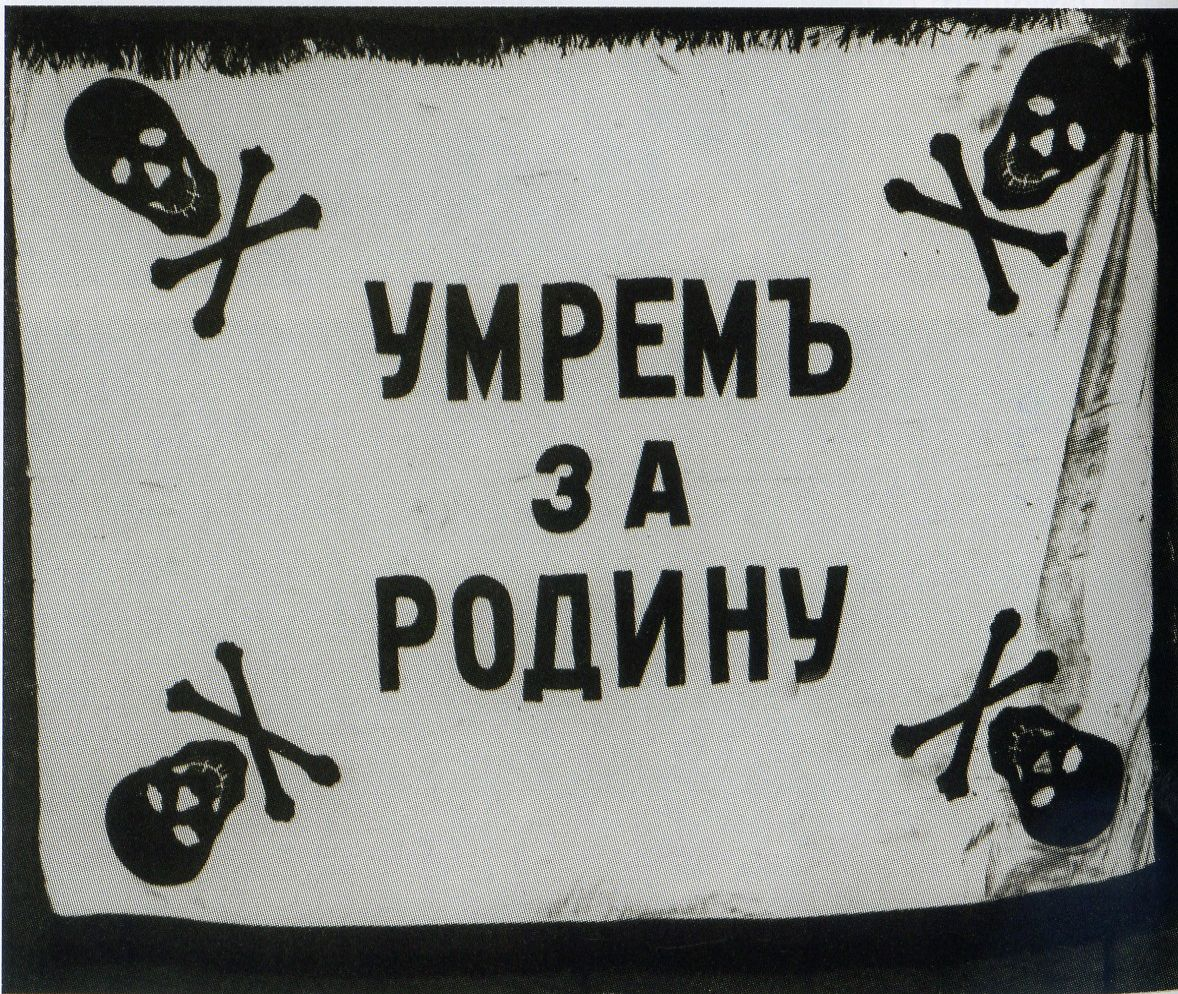
Banner of one of Russian "Death Units", formed in Eastern Front in 1917

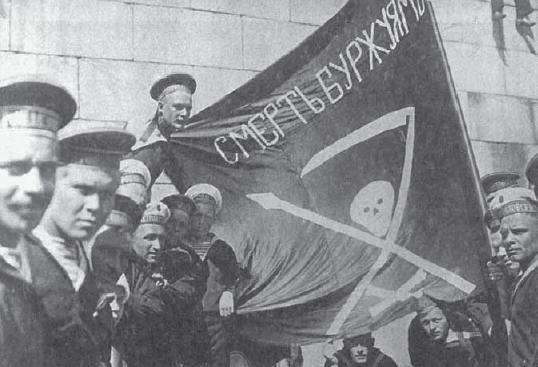
Sailors of the Russian battleship Petropavlovsk after the 1917 February Revolution (flag calls for "death to the bourgeoisie").

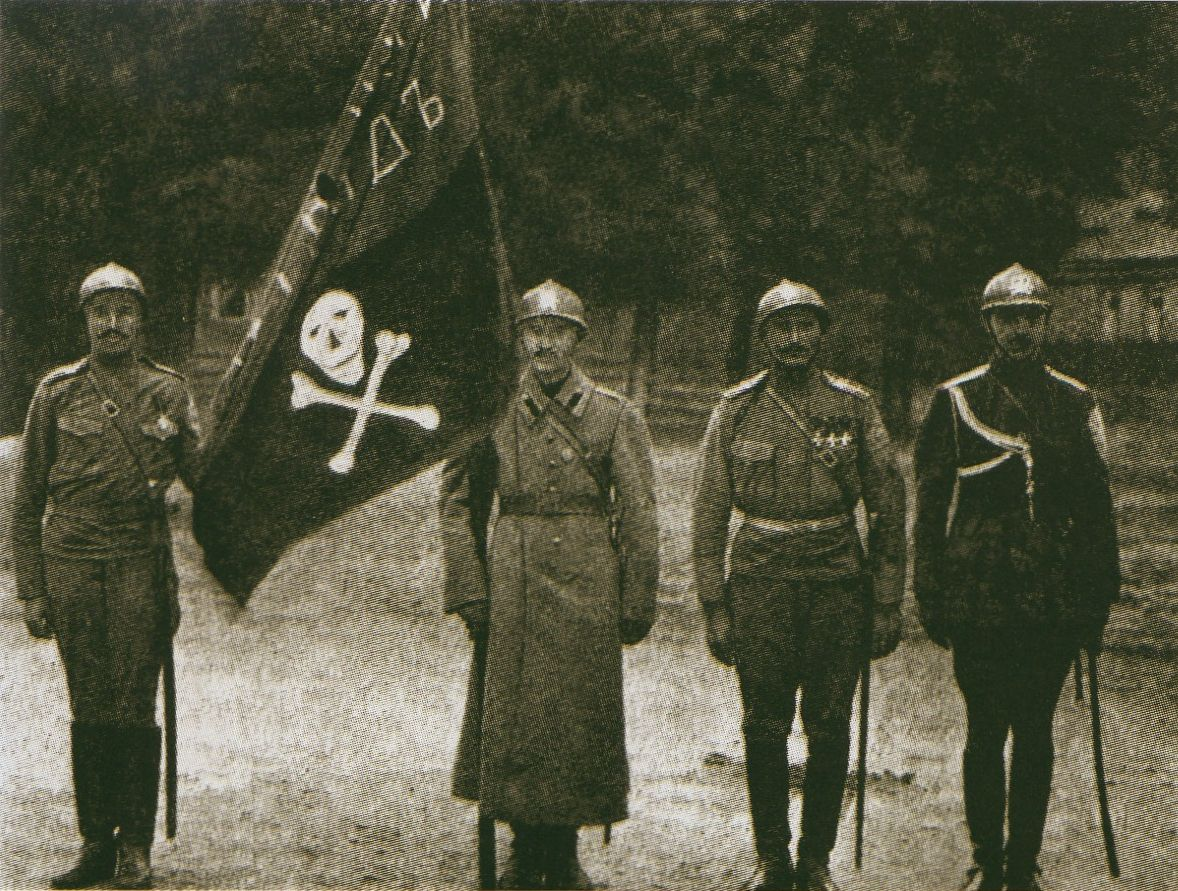
Kornilov's Shock Detachment flag bearer and honor guard (1917)

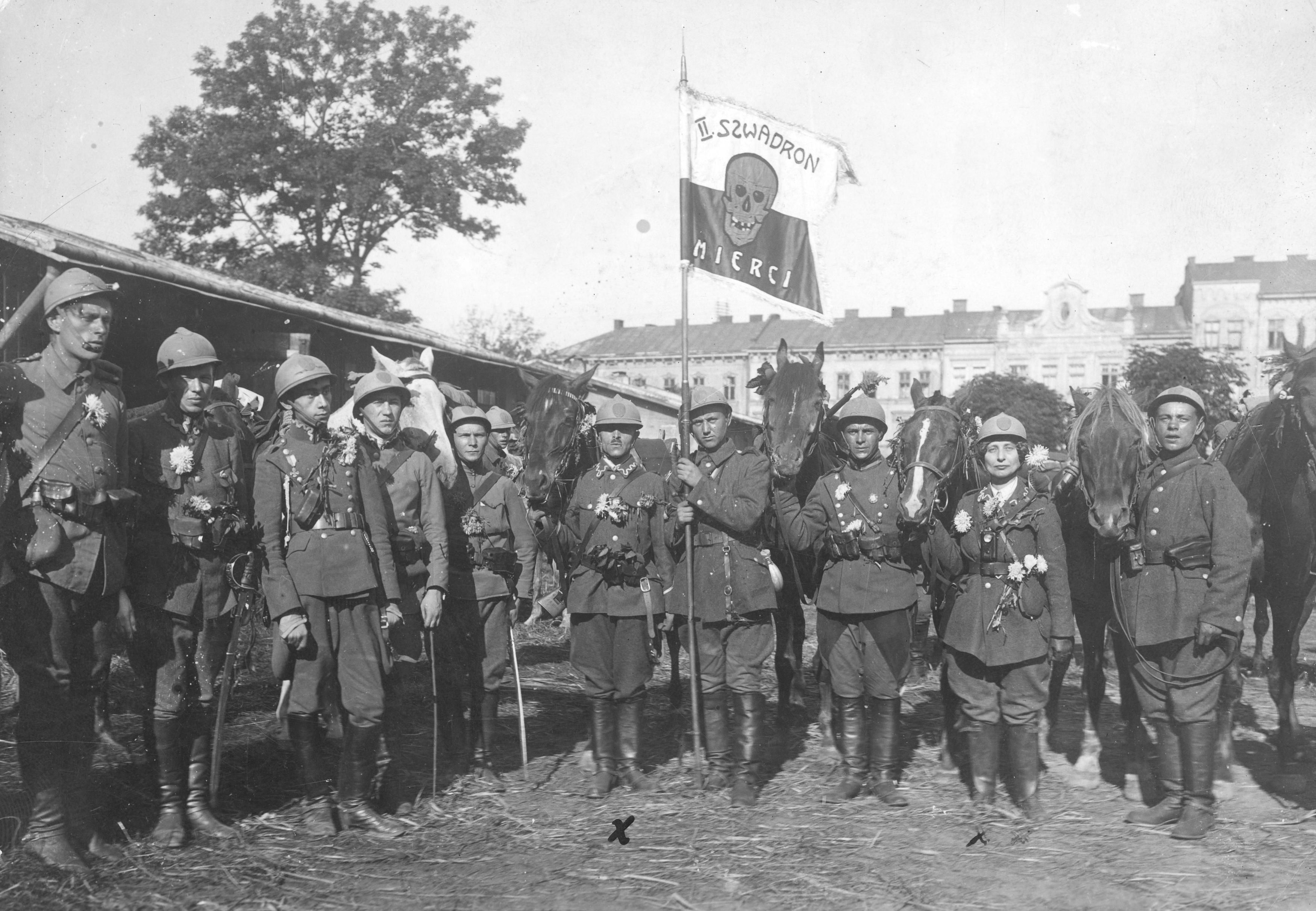
Polish Voluntary II Death Squad in Lviv, Ukraine (1920)

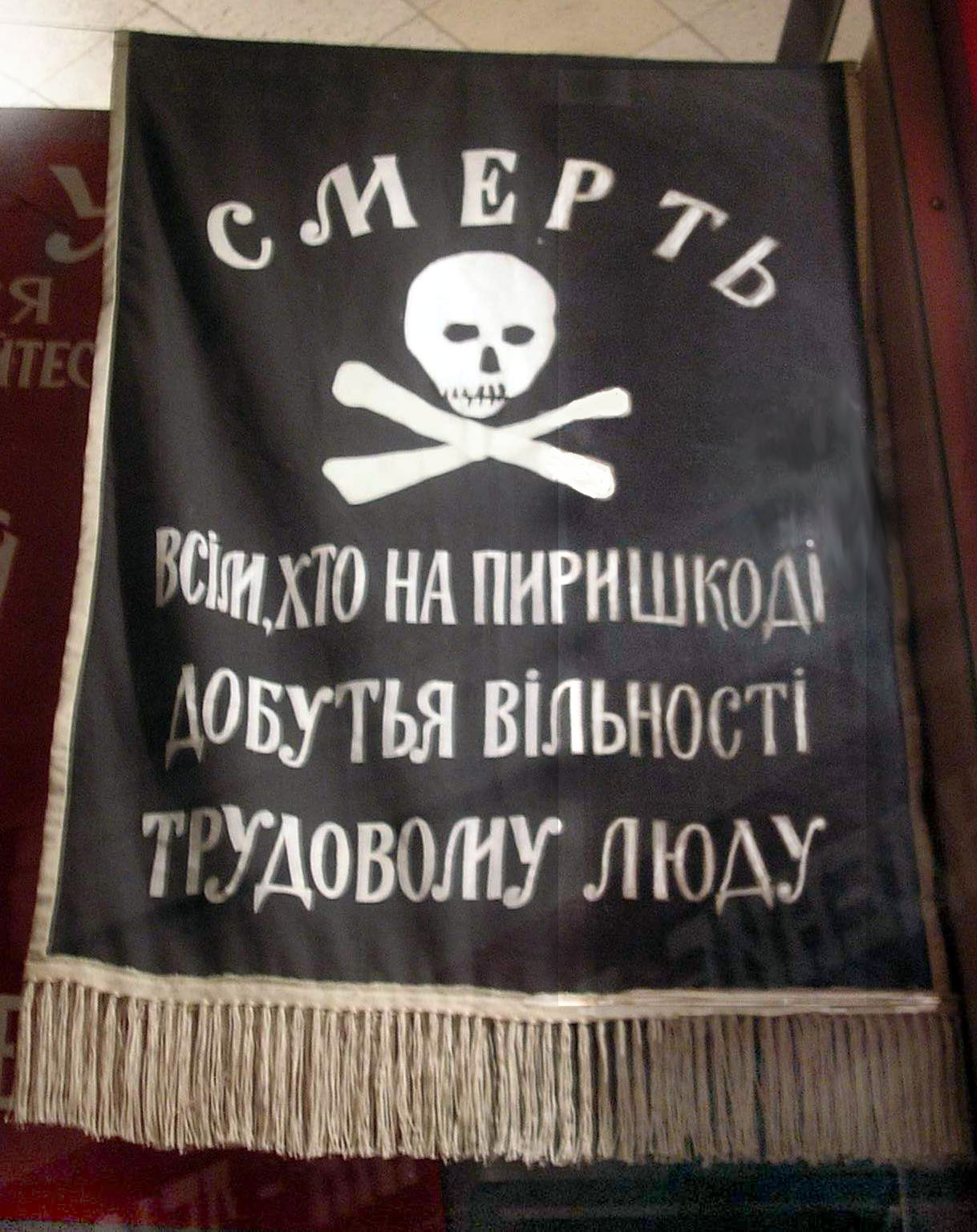
Flag used by Svyryd Kotsur's Dnipro Division, with the slogan "Death to all who stand in the way of freedom for the working people" (1920)

Reconstruction of the insignia used by the Italian anti-fascist Arditi del Popolo (1921–1924)

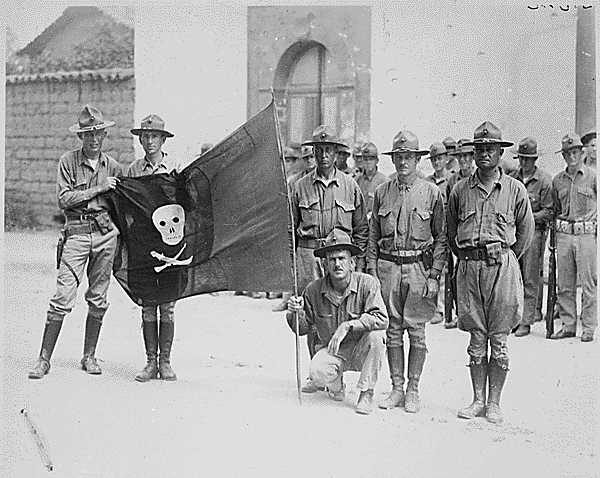
A flag captured by U.S. marines from Nicaraguan revolutionary Augusto César Sandino's forces in 1932

==== Other ====
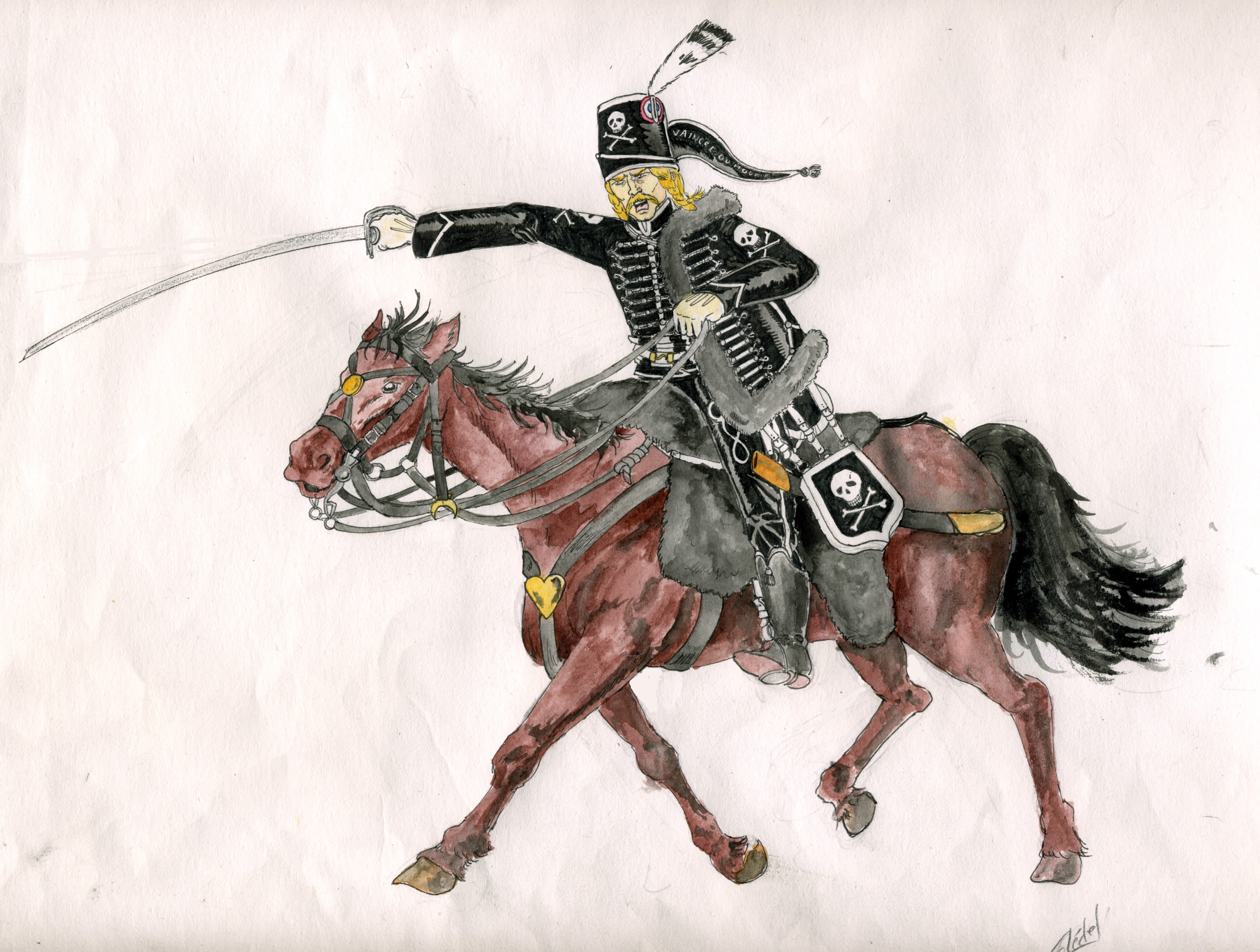
A French Hussard de la mort (1792)

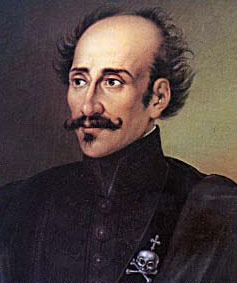
Alexander Ypsilantis, founder of the military force The Sacred Band, shown wearing the fighting force's uniform, complete with mandible-less totenkopf (1821)

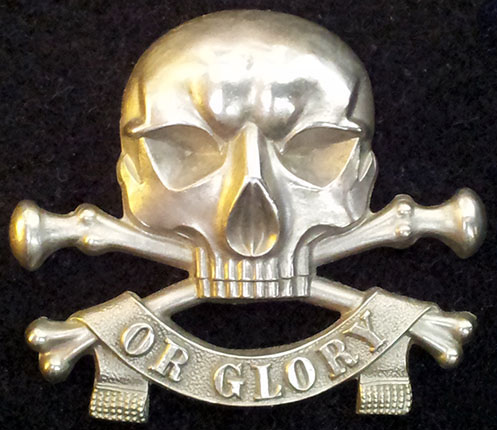
Cap badge of the British 17th Lancers

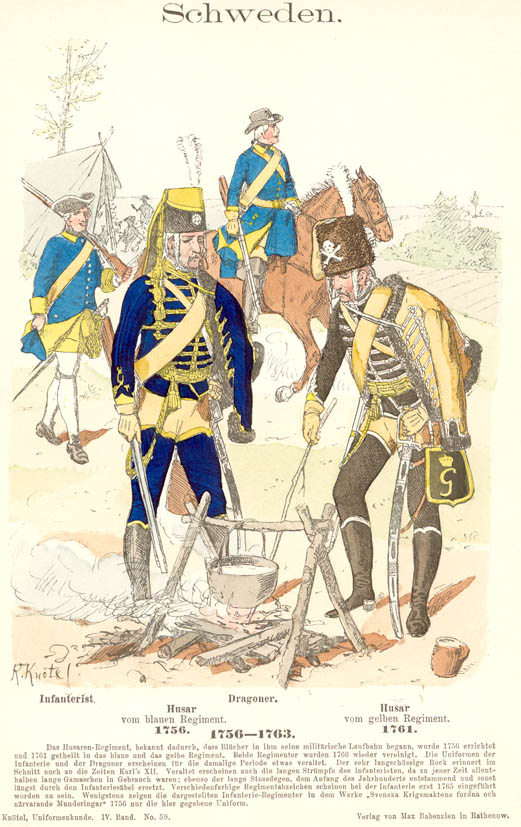
Swedish hussars in 1761

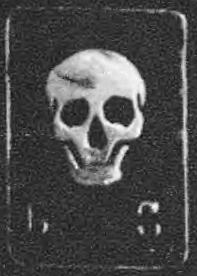
Pin worn by veterans of the Battle of Lwów. The G.S. stands for Góra Stracenia (Execution Mount) (1918).

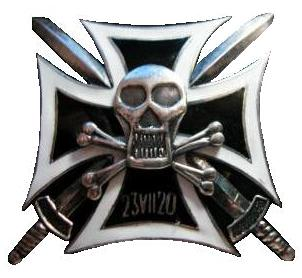
The "death's head" was the insignia of Polish Death Hussar Divisions, 1920 (Polish–Soviet War).

Early symbol of the French nationalist Fire Cross League

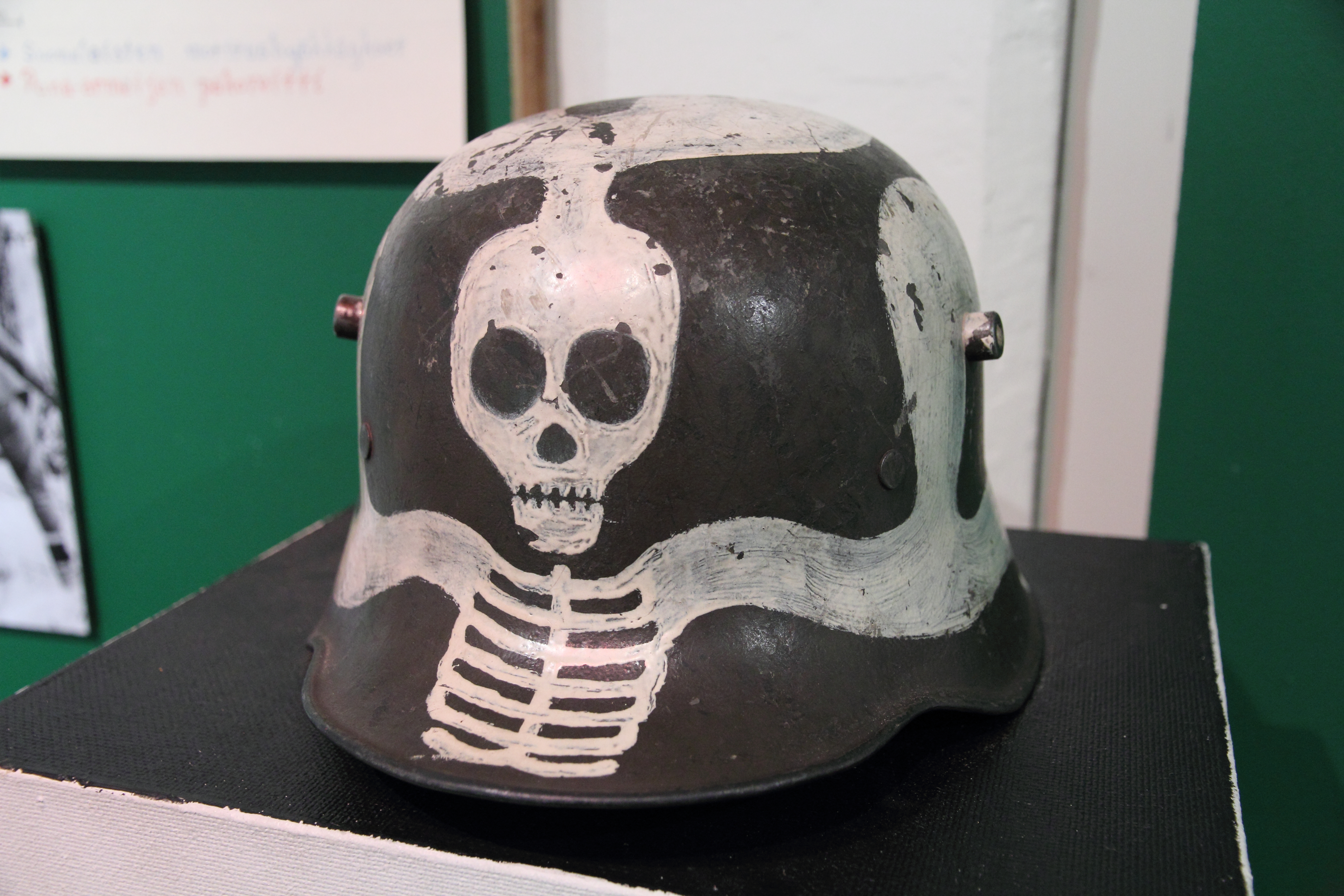
Helmet of a Finnish Light detachment 4 (World War II) in skeletal paint scheme

Insignia of the Estonian Kuperjanov Infantry Battalion

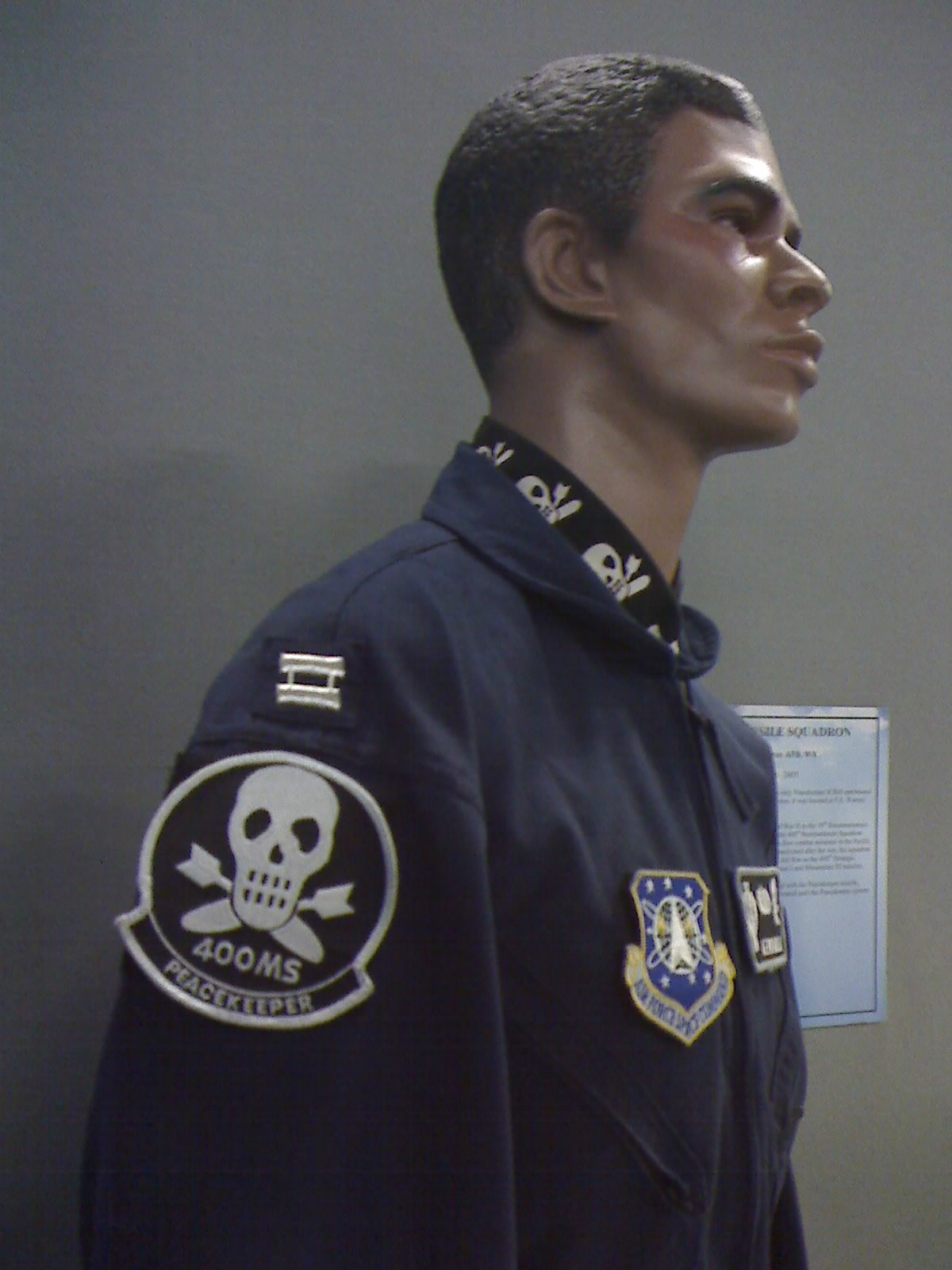
Stylized skull and crossbones on shoulder sleeve insignia of the United States Air Force 400th Missile Squadron uniform sometime between 1995 and 2005

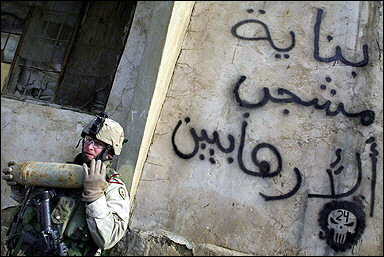
United States Army's 24th Infantry Regiment's "Deuce four skull" symbol used to mark buildings where enemy combatants had been killed in Iraq as part of Operation Iraqi Freedom (2004)

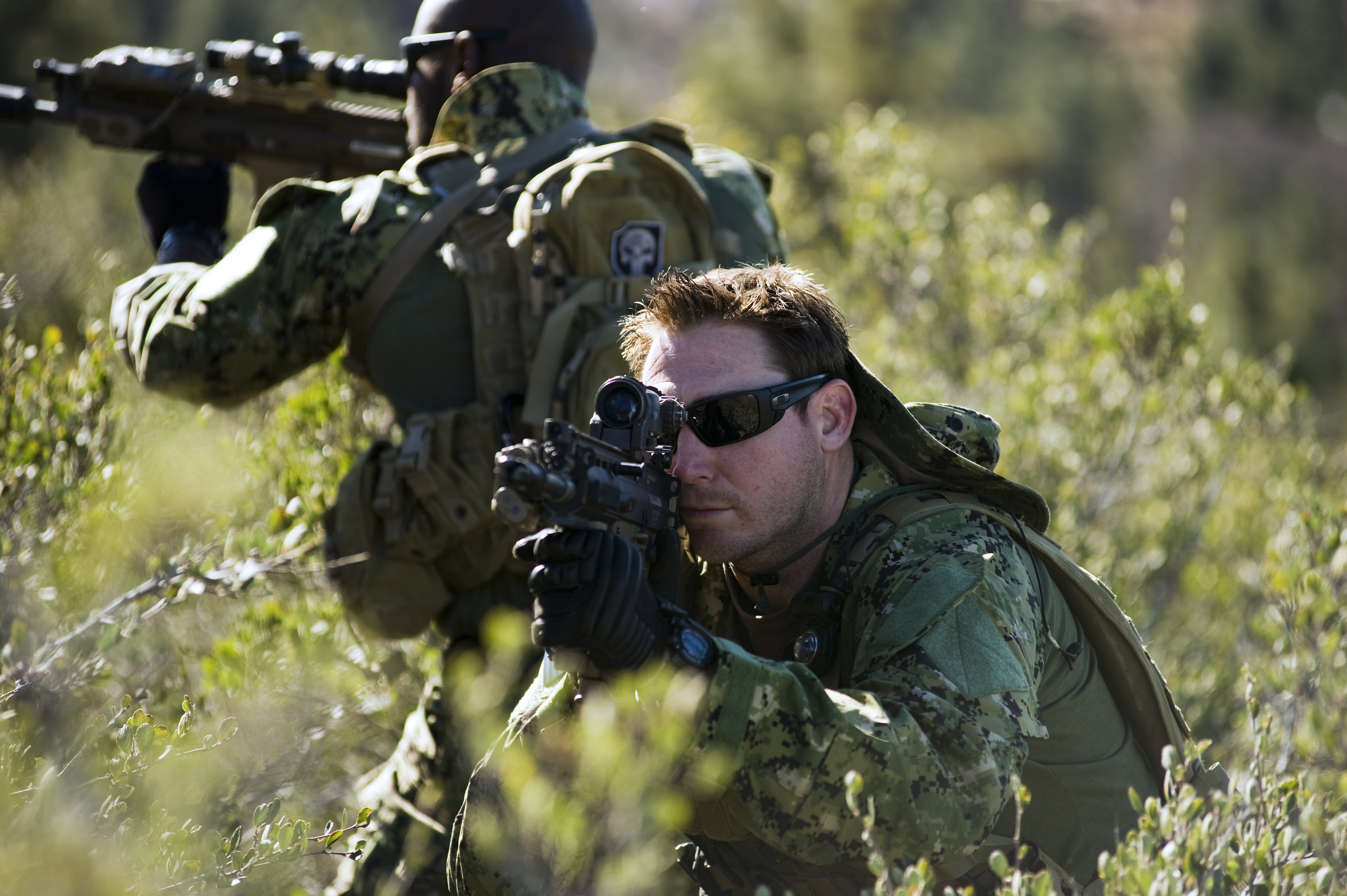
Patch depicting Punisher (Marvel character) skull symbol, without optional leg bones, worn by US Navy SEALs (2012)

Insignia of the Syrian Republican Guard (2021)

Emblem of the Polish Volunteer Corps

== Police use ==
- The uniform of the Ordnungspolizei (Orpo) – Nazi Germany's uniformed police could feature the totenkopf. The peaked visor cap of the Sicherheitsdienst (SD) featured the skull emblem.
- "Punisher" variations of the totenkopf appear on police vehicles.
- Challenge coins as used by the Firearms Training Team for the Calgary, Canada police force.
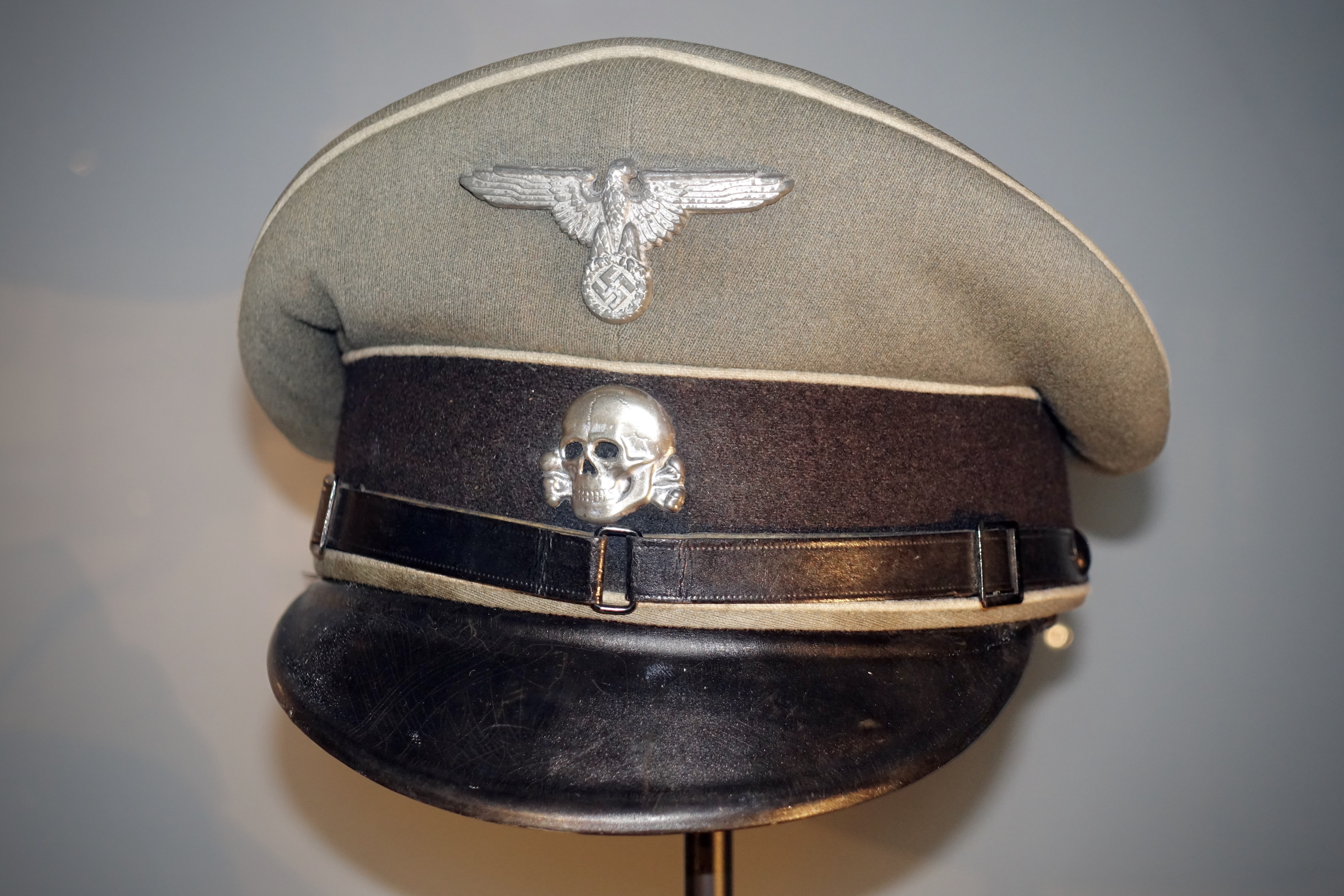
Peaked visor cap of the Sicherheitsdienst (SD) with skull emblem. Norwegian Armed Forces Museum, Oslo, Norway (1936).

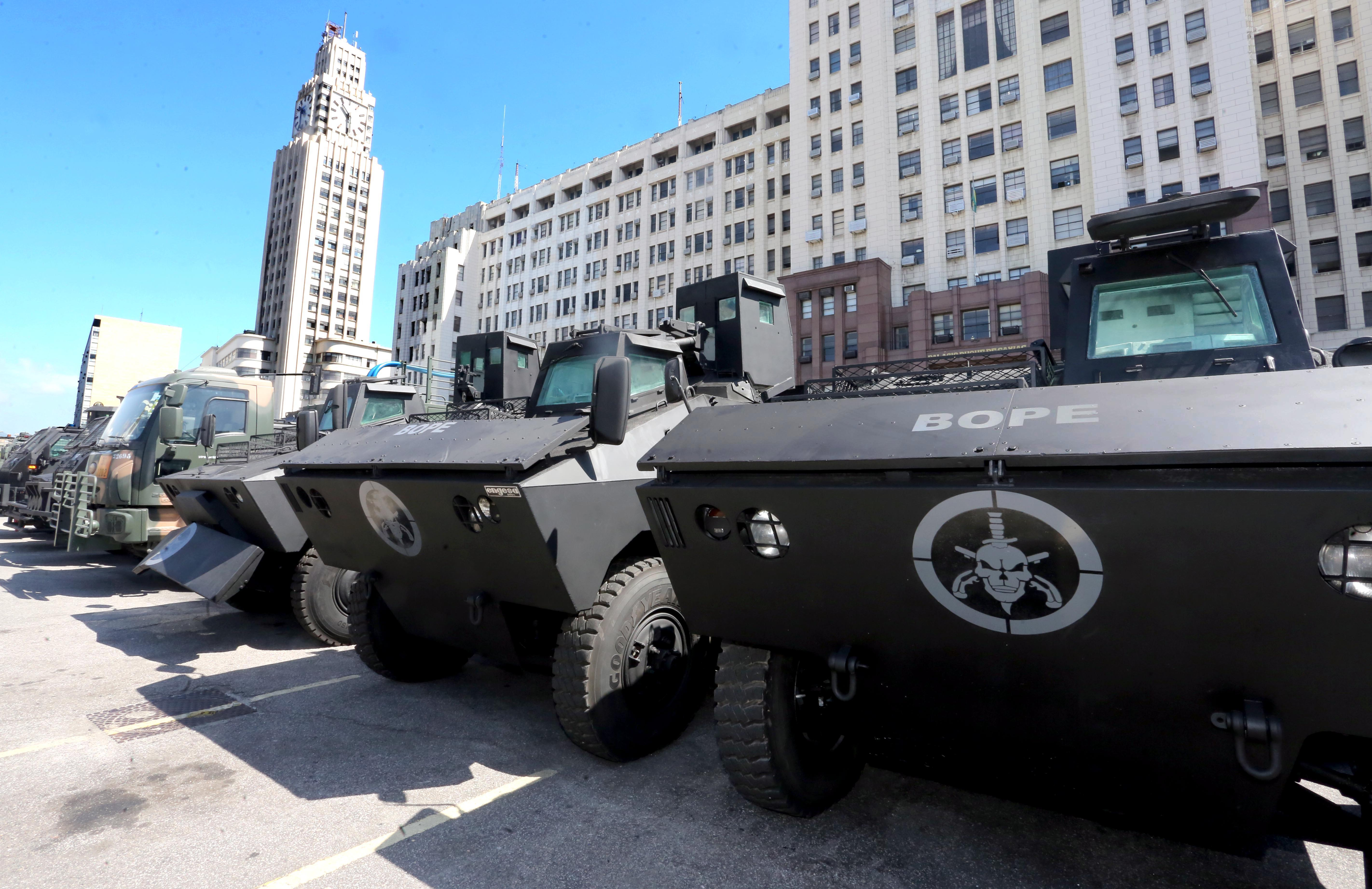
Armored personnel carrier used by the Brazilian Batalhão de Operações Policiais Especiais (BOPE). The BOPE website states the logo represents victory over death (2018).

Challenge coin used by the Firearms Training branch of the Calgary Police Service (2020).

== Other uses ==
- International hazard symbol to indicate poisonous substances
- Wilhelm "Deathshead" Strasse, a major antagonist in the Wolfenstein series, is named after the symbol
- Sometimes placed within a circle next to a 6 to represent Death in June
- The phrase "never lose your smile" is sometimes used in social media posts as a way of subtly expressing Nazi sympathies, particularly in countries where open promotion of Nazism is illegal. The phrase refers to the totenkopf skull, which, in some versions of the symbol, appears to be smiling. As the phrase also has innocuous meanings, its use by neo-Nazis is an example of a dogwhistle that relies on plausible deniability.

=== Graham Platner tattoo controversy ===
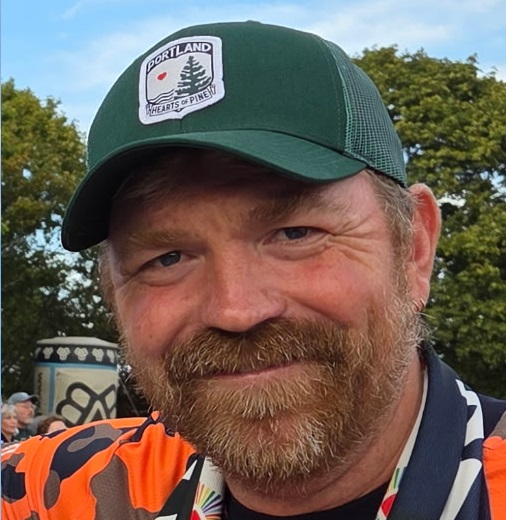
Graham Platner in 2025

In October 2025, Graham Platner, a Marine Corps veteran and oyster farmer running for the Democratic nomination in the 2026 United States Senate election in Maine, drew national attention after a chest tattoo of his was identified as resembling the Nazi Totenkopf. The tattoo appeared in footage from his brother's wedding roughly a decade earlier, in which he was shown shirtless. Platner addressed the matter on the podcast Pod Save America, stating that he had received the tattoo with several other Marines while on shore leave in Croatia in 2007 and had been unaware of its association with the SS and SS-Totenkopfverbände until contacted by reporters and political operatives.

A spokesperson for the Anti-Defamation League described the imagery as troubling for a candidate for high office, while noting that some individuals acquire such tattoos without understanding their associations and should be given an opportunity to repudiate them. Platner stated that he had the tattoo covered up after the matter came to public attention. Subsequent reporting by CNN and Jewish Insider cited an anonymous former acquaintance who claimed Platner had previously referred to the design as "my Totenkopf", disputing his claim that he was unaware of its meaning. Maine Governor Janet Mills, a rival for the Democratic nomination, characterized the tattoo as "abhorrent" while saying voters should ultimately decide his place in the race. The controversy, which coincided with reporting on a series of resurfaced Reddit posts, was followed by the resignations of several senior staff members from Platner's campaign over the following weeks.

== See also ==
- 3rd SS Division Totenkopf
- Black Brunswickers – Military unit of the Napoleonic Wars
- Fascist symbolism – Use of certain images and symbols which are designed to represent aspects of fascism
- Human skull symbolism – Attachment of symbolic meaning
- Jolly Roger – Pirate flag
- Kampfgeschwader 54
- Kuperjanov Battalion – Estonian military unit
- Memento mori – Artistic or symbolic reminder of the inevitability of death
- Skull and Bones – Secret society at Yale University, US
- SS-Totenkopfverbände – Branch of the SS that managed the Nazi camps (1936–1945)
- The Punisher – Marvel Comics fictional character

== Bibliography ==
- Klaus D. Patzwall: Der SS-Totenkopfring. 5th edition: Patzwall, Melbeck 2010, ISBN 978-3-931533-07-6.
- Joost Hølscher (Author, Illustrator): Death's Head, The History of the Military Skull & Crossbones Badge (The History of Uniform). 1st edition: Éditions Chamerelle 2013, ISBN 978-90-820326-0-4
- Adrian Ruda: Der Totenkopf als Motiv. Eine historisch-kulturanthropologische Analyse zwischen Militär und Moden (The Skull as Motif: A Historical-Cultural Anthropological Analysis between Military and Fashion). Böhlau, Köln 2023, ISBN 978-3-412-52890-4.
