= Mirliton (military) =

Tall military cap

Mirliton, Flügelmütze, or Flügelkappe was a tall hat worn by hussars, light cavalrymen, and light infantrymen in the period 1750–1800, remaining in increasingly rare usage through the German Wars of Unification.

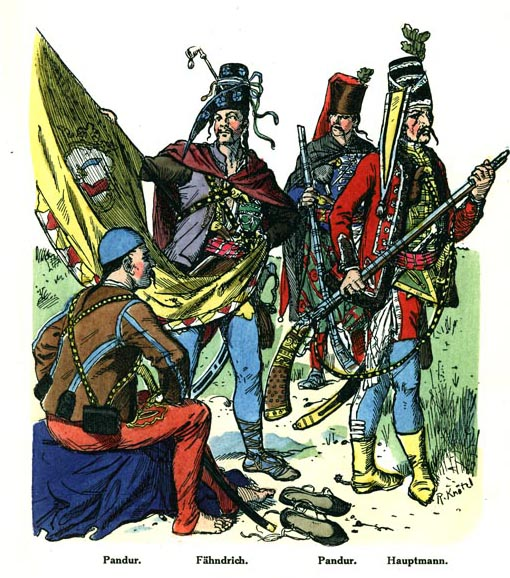
The three Croatian light troops on the right wear the Flügelkappe. Uniforms are from circa 1750.

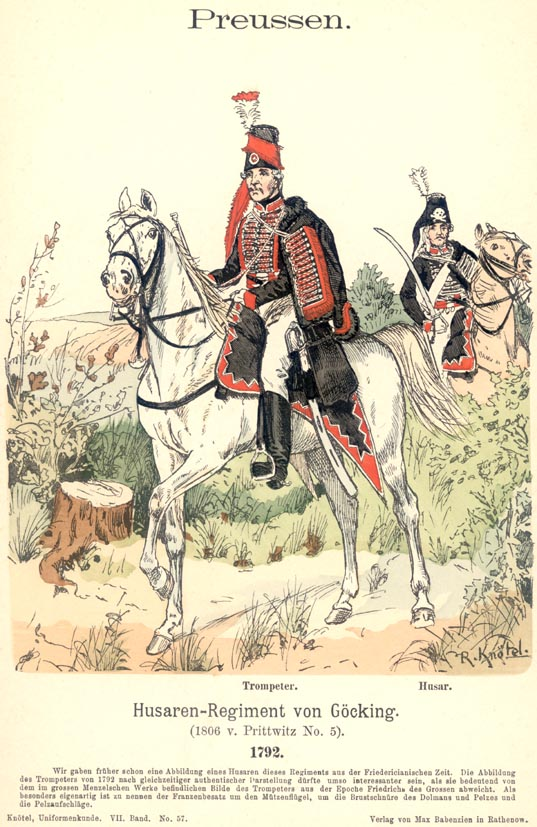
Two Prussian Hussars from 1792 wear the Flügelmütze, one with the death's head emblem.

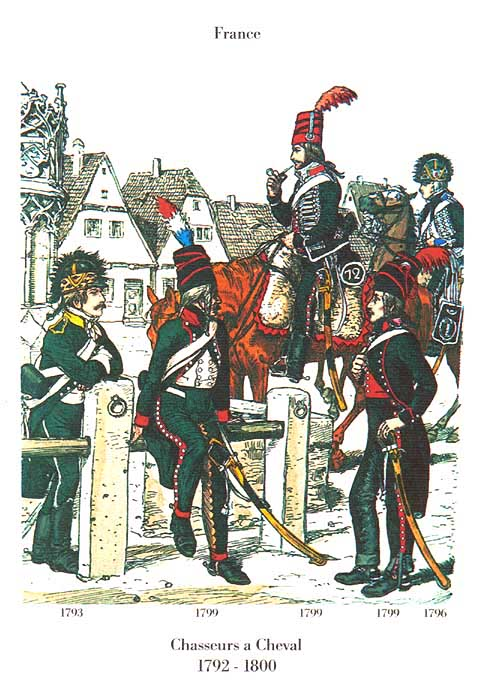
The three French Chasseurs à Cheval in the center wear mirlitons. Their uniforms are from 1799.

== See also ==
- Busby
