= Dressing table =

Furniture for personal grooming

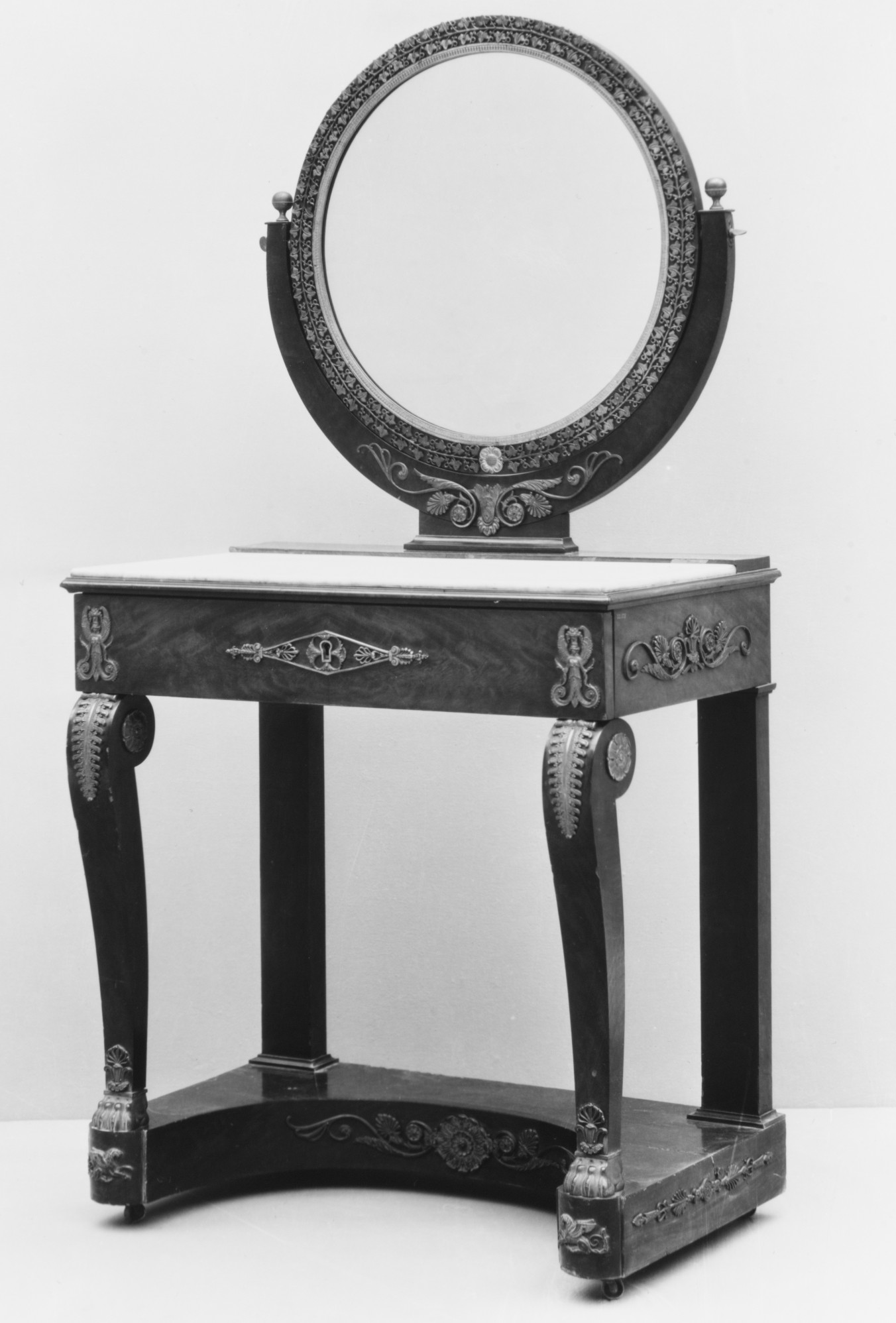
Dressing table (ca. 1815–1830)

The dressing table (also a vanity table or simply a vanity, in Australian English, a duchess) is a table specifically designed for performing one's toilette (dressing, applying makeup and other personal grooming), intended for a bedroom or a boudoir.

== Terminology ==
The dressing table is one of the examples of a rapid change in terminology. Originally in the 18th century it was called a toilet table, or simply a toilet, occasionally toiletta. However, as the American word "toilet" changed its meaning to describe a toilet bowl and became a vulgarity somewhere in the 19th century, the term dressing table (that was in use earlier as well) had quickly replaced the toilet in the US, while the British, with their lavatory, were able to keep the word "toilet" neutral and to retain the toilet terminology for longer. The word "toilette" comes as a French diminutive form of toile, a cloth that from Medieval times was spread on top of a table prior to using cosmetics. For some time in the 18th century American English contained a spelling variant twilight table.

In the US, a term "lowboy" is used to describe a dressing table with multiple drawers made to match a tall chest, tallboy.

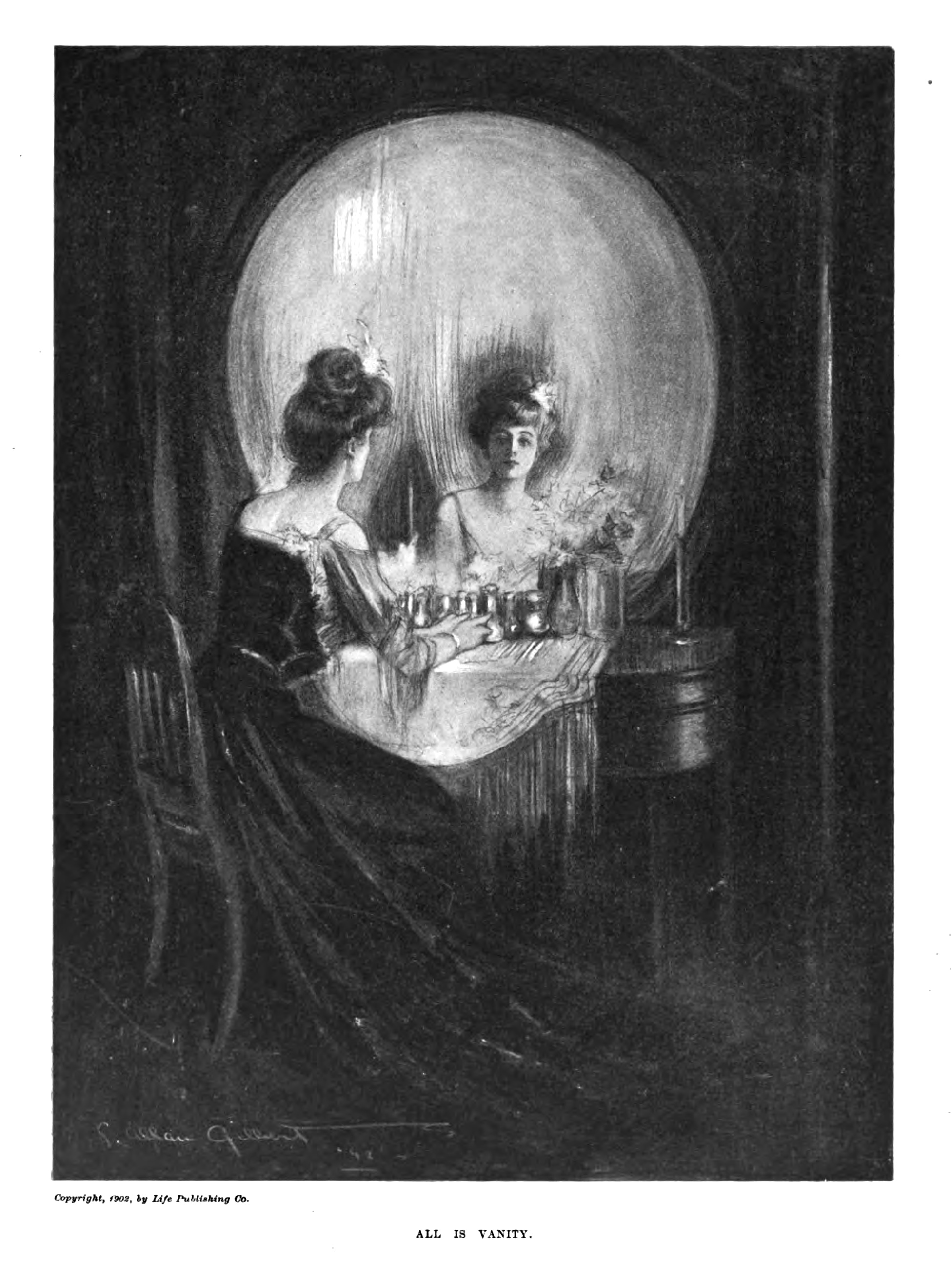
"All Is Vanity" by Gilbert

One of the best visual expressions of a connection between the vanity table and vanitas was made by Charles Allan Gilbert in his All Is Vanity (1892).

=== Bureau dressing table ===
A combination of the writing desk and dressing table for the private space first appeared in the early 18th century in a shape of bureau on top of shallow drawers supported by the cabriole legs with toilet mirror above the bureau. By the middle of the 18th century, Thomas Chippendale was selling buroe dressing tables that combined the dressing and writing tables with drawers without an actual bureau or built-in mirror.

== History ==
Adlin traces the history of vanity from the cosmetic box storage box known for a very long time (storage container for ointments, face paints, perfumes was excavated from the tomb of an Egyptian scribe Reniseneb, 15th century BC). The renewed interest in self-adornment during the Renaissance created the étuis and the need for the tabletops to put them on. By the late 17th century the dressing table took its familiar shape. A mirror became an essential part of the dressing table in the middle of the 18th century, it was either mounted in a rotating frame or designed to fold into the table itself.

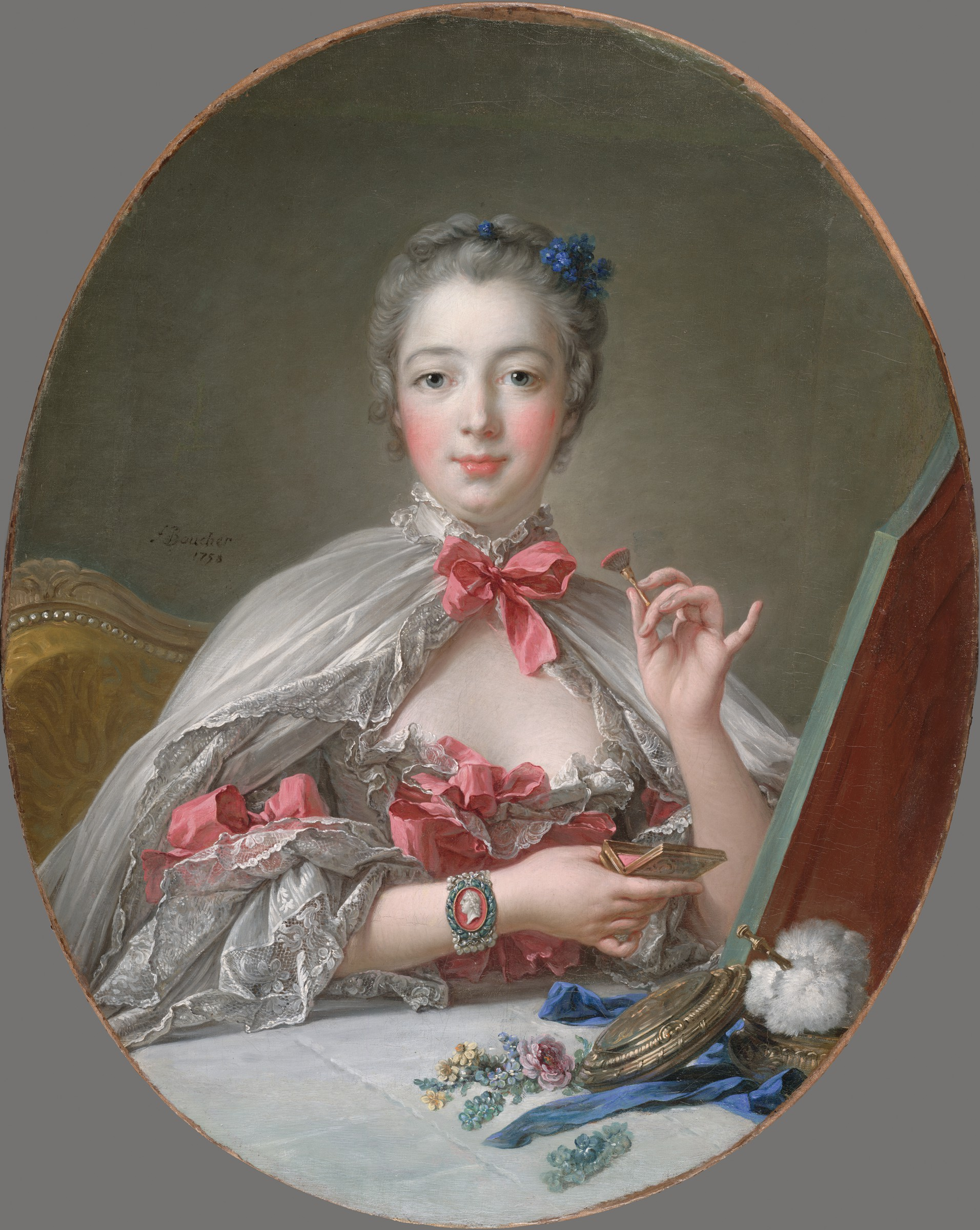
Marquise at her toilet table in 1750

The dressing table reached peak of its importance and owes it to Marquise de Pompadour who changed the originally private toilette ritual into a morning reception. The time of Marie Antoinette marks an appearance of a specially designed chair, fateuil de toilette, a predecessor of the modern barber chairs. By the end of the 18th century, "dressing boxes" on tall legs were designed for men so they can shave while standing.

Dressing tables often featured dressing table sets, a collection of china, porcelain, glass, crystal, or metal objects and receptacles for tools or personal grooming products. These could include a comb, brush, hand mirror, perfume atomizer, buttonhook, powder jar, hatpin holder, a shoehorn, hair receiver and a tray.

In the 21st century, with a few notable exceptions shown at the exhibits, the vanity tables are rarely produced and used; application of makeup occupies just a few moments in front of the bathroom mirror. A new demand for dressing tables was caused by beauty influencers on the social media, their young female followers have limited space, spurring the creation of new compact designs.

== Design ==
=== Europe and United States ===
The vanity furniture set with matching dressing chair and table became a display of wealth in the piece made by Nicolas Henri Jacob for, likely, Marie-Caroline, Duchess of Berry. This light-reflecting set is made almost entirely of cut crystal and bronze, with candelabras depicting Zephyrus and Flora supporting a rotating mirror (the ballet Flore et Zéphire had just become popular).

The evolution of the dressing table naturally followed the furniture styles. For example, in the 19th century in United States, the desks could be found in the English Chippendale style, as well as in a variety of revivalist stylizations, from Elizabethan to Colonial. Charles-Honoré Lannuier, after moving to the US in 1803, established a popular "New York" style, mostly based on the Napoleonic one. A brief reign of Art Nouveau freed the dressing table shape from the confines of tradition, yielding striking pieces by Hector Guimard, Louis Majorelle, and Antoni Gaudi.

After an interruption of the First World War, Art Deco took over, with a showcase example of the dressing table produced by one of the leaders of the movement, Émile-Jacques Ruhlmann. His Colonette dressing table plays on the meaning of the toile with a cloth-imitating marquetry, made of ivory and ebony, placed at the center. The Bauhaus modernists of the early 20th century with their clean, occasionally amazingly simple, designs, inspired American designers, like Paul T. Frankl with his skyscraper-themed tables with oversized (semi-)circular mirrors.

In the aftermath of the Second World War, a Good Design movement in the US and Scandinavia called for stylish yet functional and inexpensive products, making the dressing table to become a reality for a middle-class home. For example, a combination writing desk and dressing table by Børge Mogensen (1950) reused the cover of the top drawer as a base of the pop-up mirror and the surface for writing, returning to the concept of the bureau dressing table. In Ettore Sottsass' console and mirror (1965) the shaving surface for men no longer stands on the floor and is hanging on the wall instead. After experiments with new materials in the 1960s and 1970s, the postmodernists like Sottsass and Michael Graves turned to revivalism, now combined with whimsical irony (cf. Graves' Plaza dressing table and stool set).

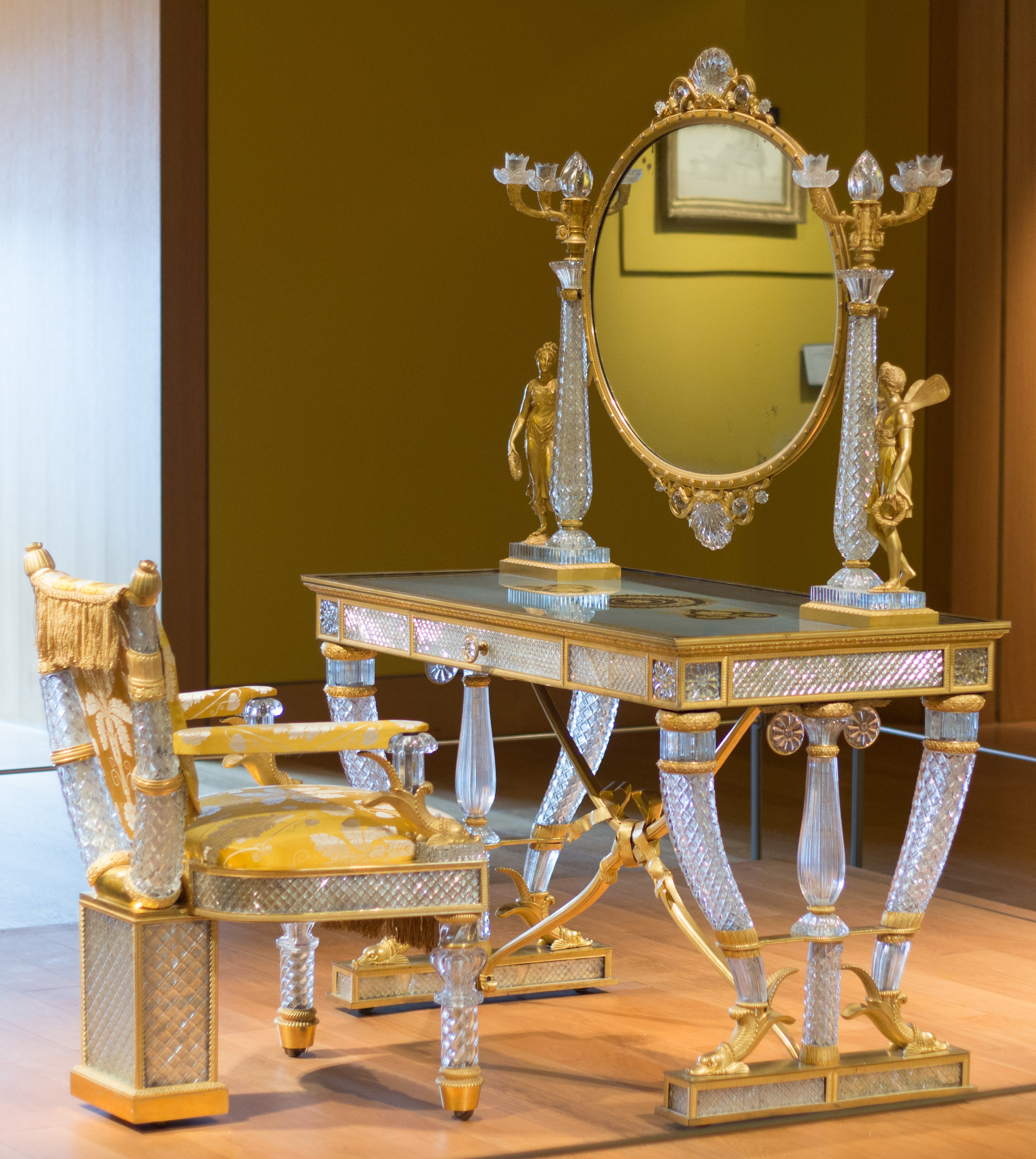
The dressing table of Marie-Caroline (ca. 1819) in the Louvre

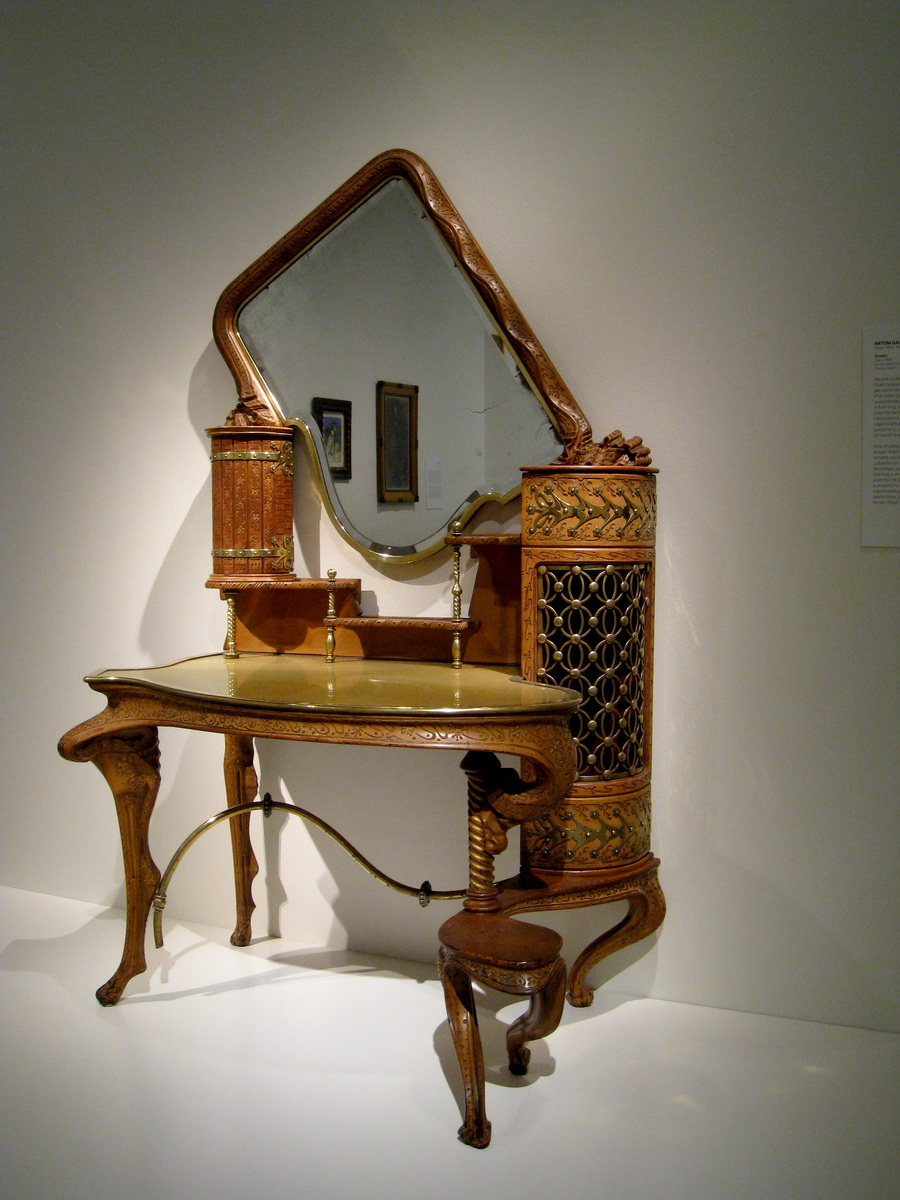
Dressing table by Gaudi (1889)

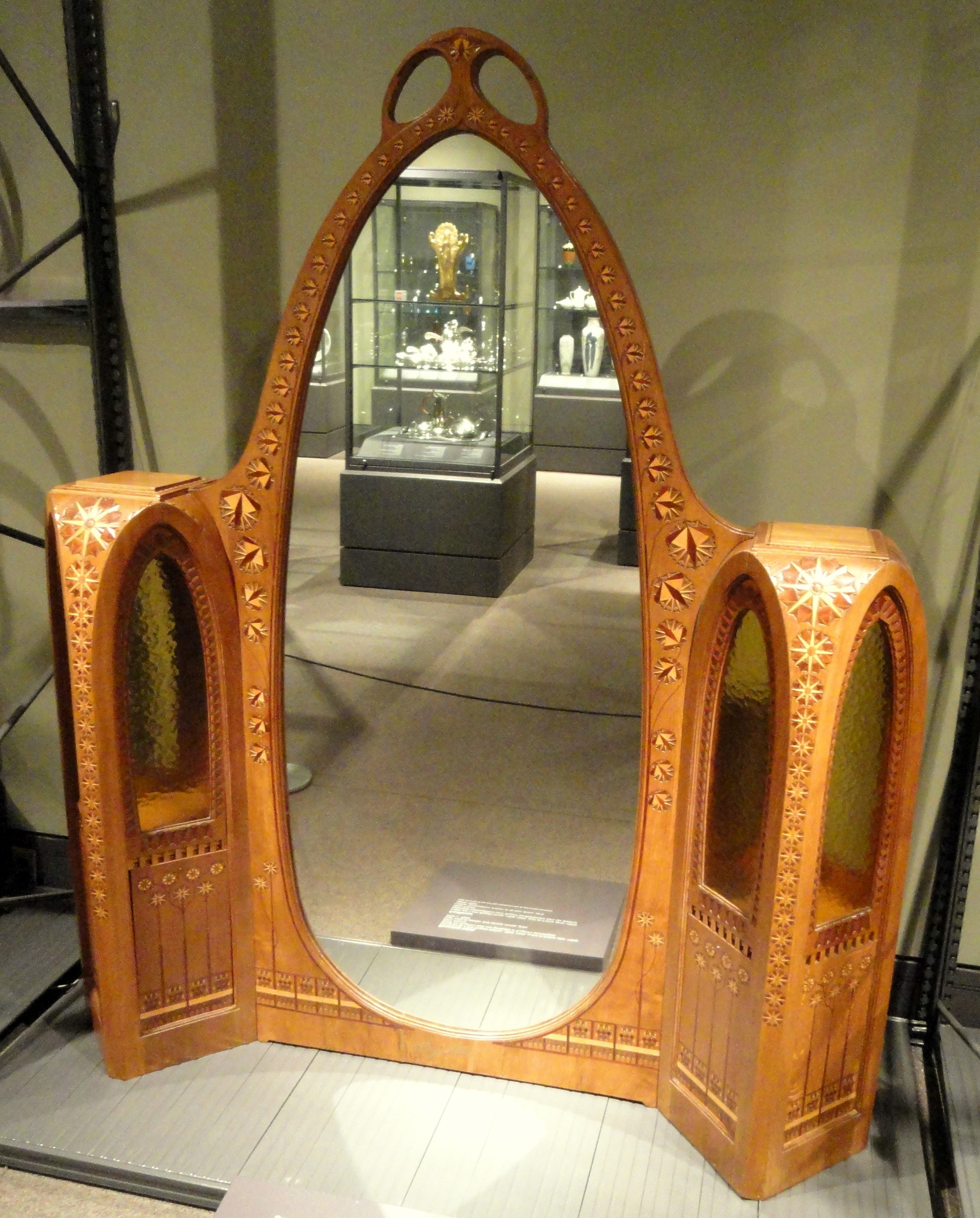
Men's dressing table (Carlo Bugatti, ca. 1904)

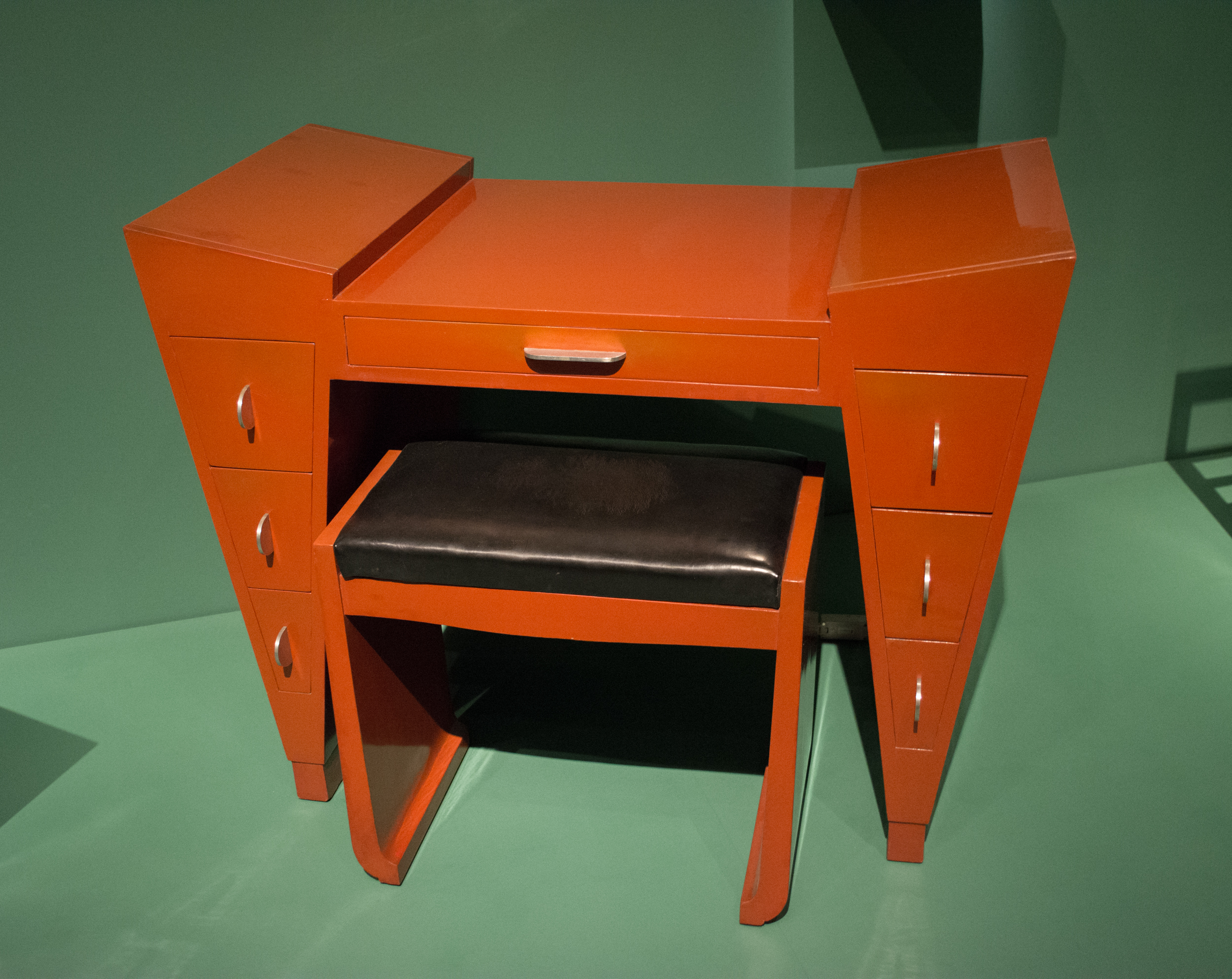
Dressing table in the cubist style (unknown designer imitating Léon Jallot, 1929)

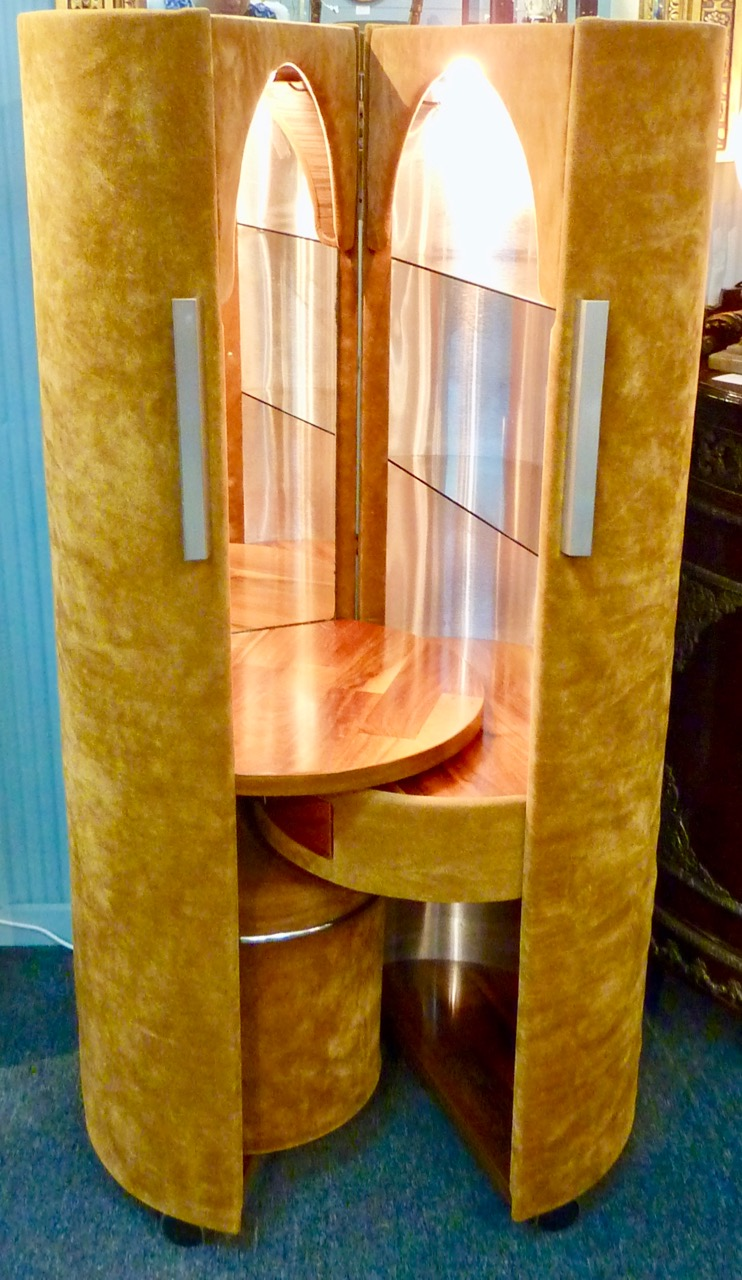
Cylinder dressing table by Luigi Massoni (half-closed, ca. 1970)

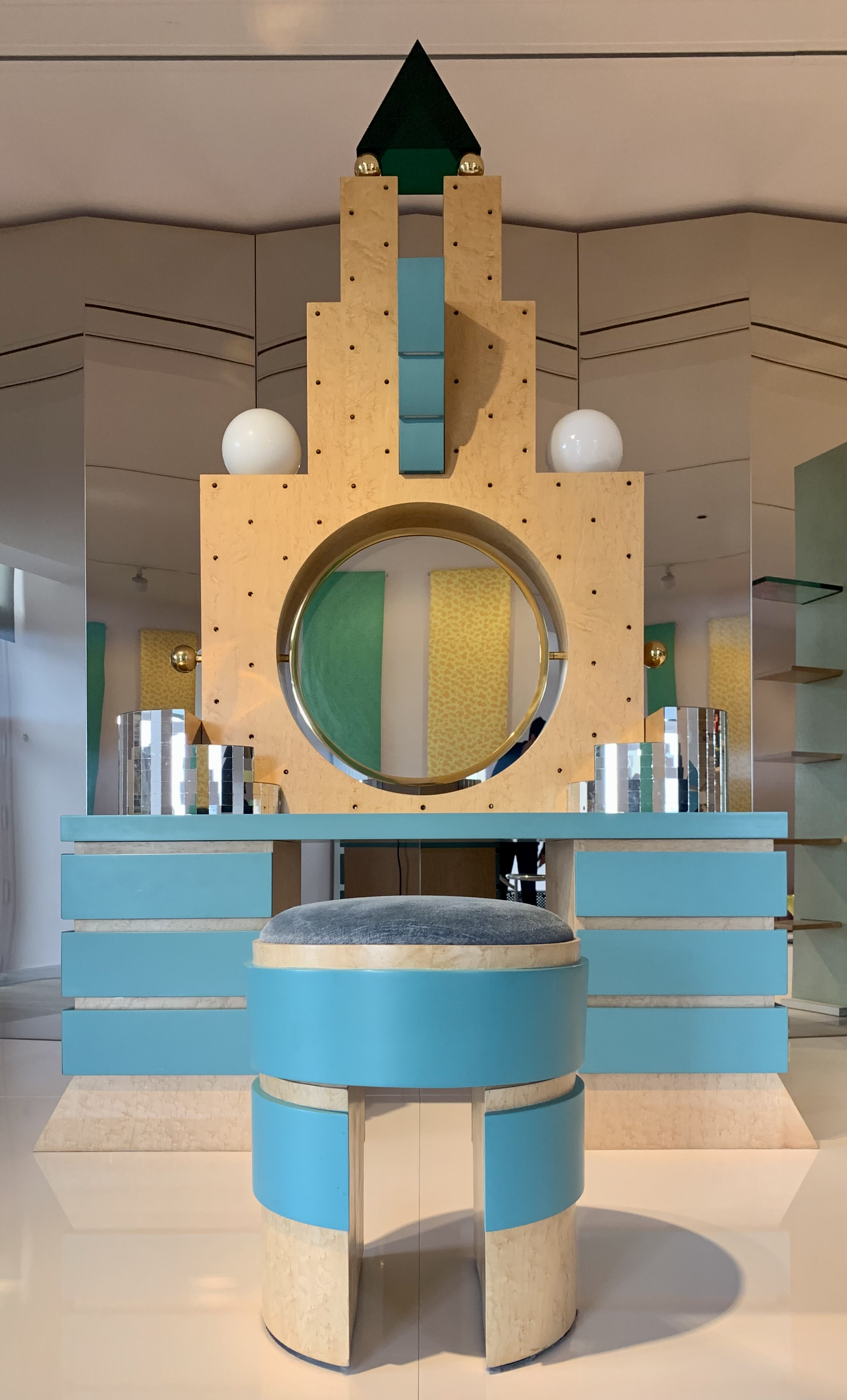
"Plaza" vanity set by Graves (1981)

=== Japan ===
In Japan, women did not use dressing tables, they were instead kneeling in front of the low "cosmetic stands".

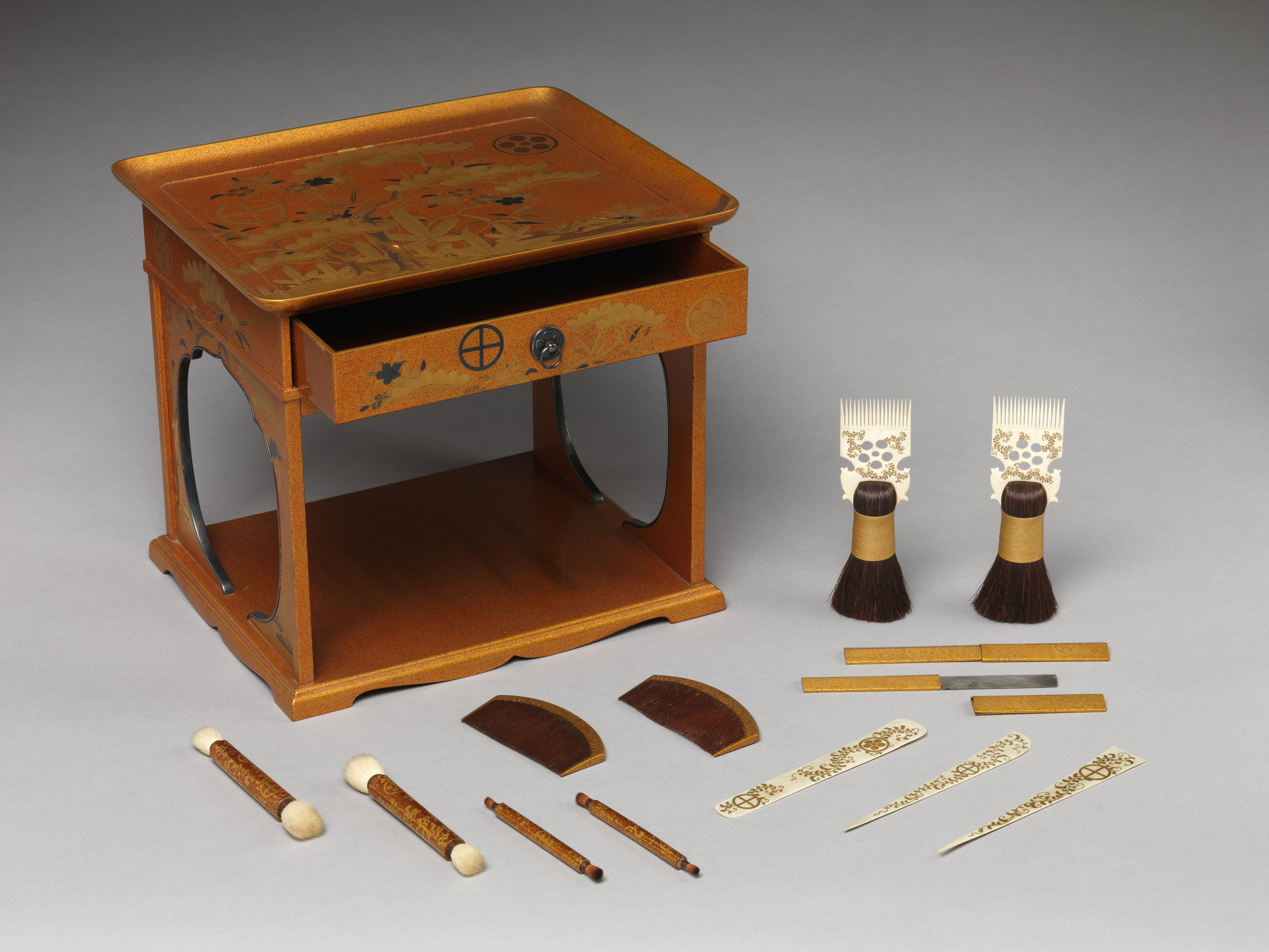
Cosmetic stand from a wedding trousseau, early 19th century

== See also ==
- Kneehole desk, a small writing desk also designed for a private space

== Sources ==
- Adlin, Jane (Fall 2013). "Vanities: art of the dressing table". Bulletin of the Metropolitan Museum of Art. with contributions from Lori Zabar. LXXI (2). Metropolitan Museum of Art.
- Forman, Benno M. (July 1987). "Furniture for Dressing in Early America, 1650-1730: Forms, Nomenclature, and Use". Winterthur Portfolio. 22 (2/3): 149–164. doi:10.1086/496323. eISSN 1545-6927. ISSN 0084-0416. JSTOR 1181113. S2CID 161115300.
- Cesare, Carla Jeanne (2007). At the dressing table: the seat of modern femininity (PDF) (MA). National Design Museum, Smithsonian Institution and Parsons The New School for Design.
- Gloag, John (1952). A Short Dictionary Of Furniture. Read Books Ltd. ISBN 978-1-4474-9772-1. OCLC 1099027952.
- Gloag, John (1969). A Short Dictionary of Furniture: Containing Over 2,600 Entries That Include Terms and Names Used in Britain and the USA (2nd ed.). Taylor & Francis. ISBN 978-1-00-077614-0.
- Fischer, Andreas (2004). ""Non olet": Euphemisms we live by". New Perspectives on English Historical Linguistics. John Benjamins Publishing Company. pp. 91–107. doi:10.1075/cilt.252.08fis. ISSN 0304-0763.
- Choirunnisa, Diena Yudiarti; Setiawan, Alvian Fajar (2021). "Pemanfaatan Papan Bambu Laminasi Untuk Perancangan Meja Rias Set Skin Care Dan Make Up Bagi Mahasiswa". EProceedings of Art & Design (in Indonesian). 8 (5).
