= Visual pun =

Pun involving an image, often a rebus

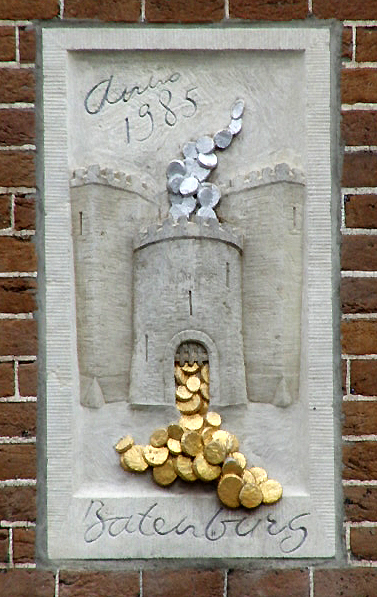
A gable stone in the village of Batenburg, Netherlands depicting a visual pun: Batenburg (Dutch for "profit castle") is shown as a castle turning silver coins into more valuable gold coins, thus creating profit.

A visual pun is a pun involving an image or images (in addition to or instead of language), often based on a rebus.

Visual puns in which the image is at odds with the inscription are common in cartoons such as Lost Consonants or The Far Side as well as in Dutch gable stones. For instance, a gable stone in the village of Batenburg puns on the words baten ('to profit') and burg ('castle') by depicting silver coins becoming gold in a castle.

European heraldry contains the technique of canting arms, which can be considered punning.

== In heraldry ==
Visual puns on the bearer's name are used extensively as forms of heraldic expression. These are called canting arms. They have been used for centuries across Europe and have also been used recently by members of the British royal family, such as on the arms of Queen Elizabeth the Queen Mother and of Princess Beatrice of York. The arms of U.S. Presidents Theodore Roosevelt and Dwight D. Eisenhower are also canting.

== In visual arts ==
Surrealist artists such as Salvador Dalí, René Magritte, Marcel Duchamp, and Remedios Varo made extensive use of visual puns, as they played with shifting perceptions and reality. Graphic artists (such as Maurits Cornelis Escher and Noma Bar) and photographers (such as Man Ray and Dora Maar) have used visual puns for a surreal or humorous effect, or to catch the attention of a viewer. Some types of optical illusions also operate within the liminal zones of perception.

== Gallery ==
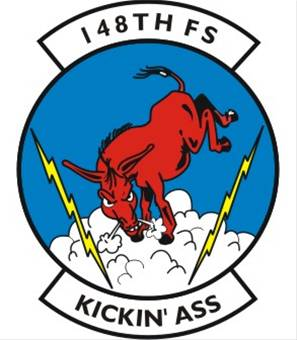
USAF squadron emblem shows a kicking donkey (ass) with slogan "Kickin' Ass"

The coat of arms (a canting arms) of Roosevelt, whose name means “rose field” in Dutch.

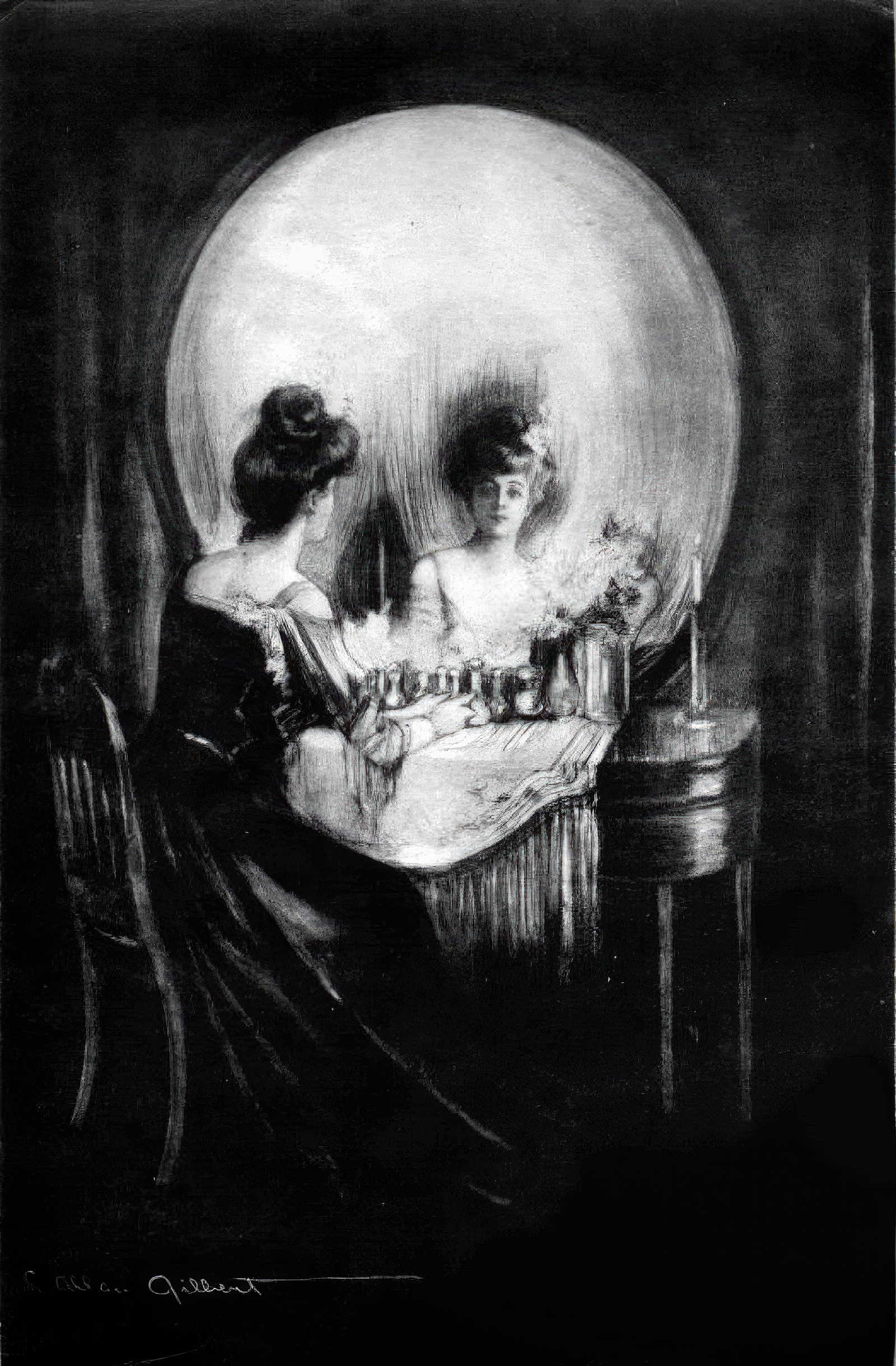
All is Vanity (1892) by C. Allan Gilbert (the table is a vanity)

Royal standard of Queen Elizabeth the Queen Mother (a canting arms), her maiden name being Bowes-Lyon: bows and lions.

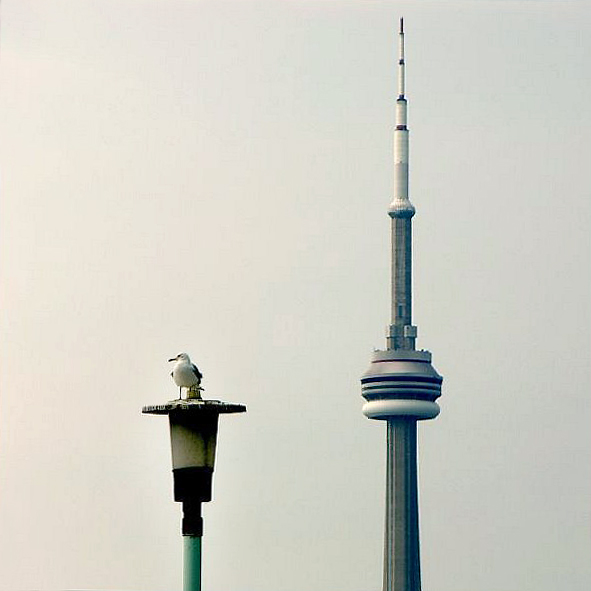
A lamppost (foreground) and Toronto's CN Tower (in distance)

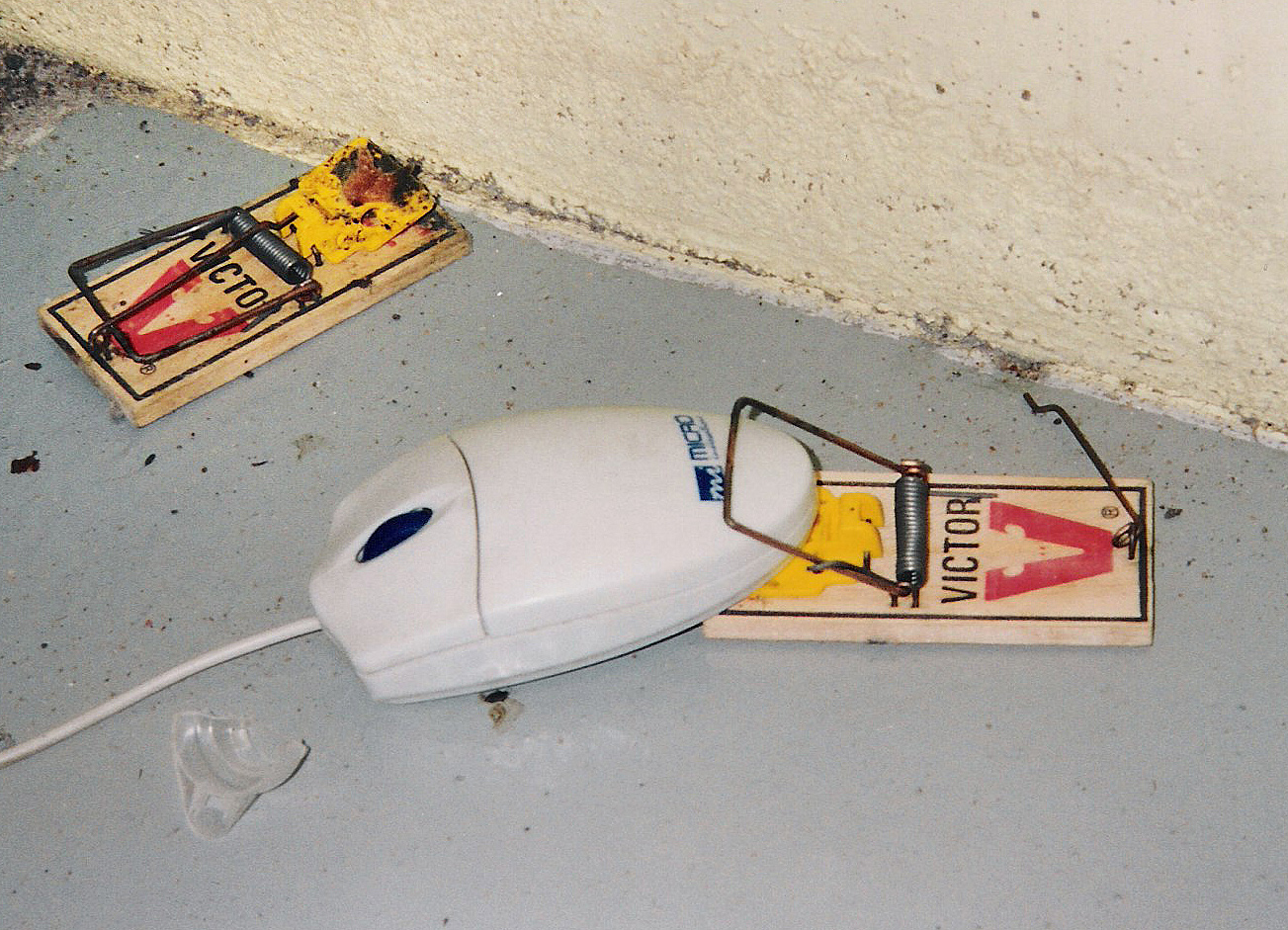
A computer mouse caught in a mousetrap typically used for live mice

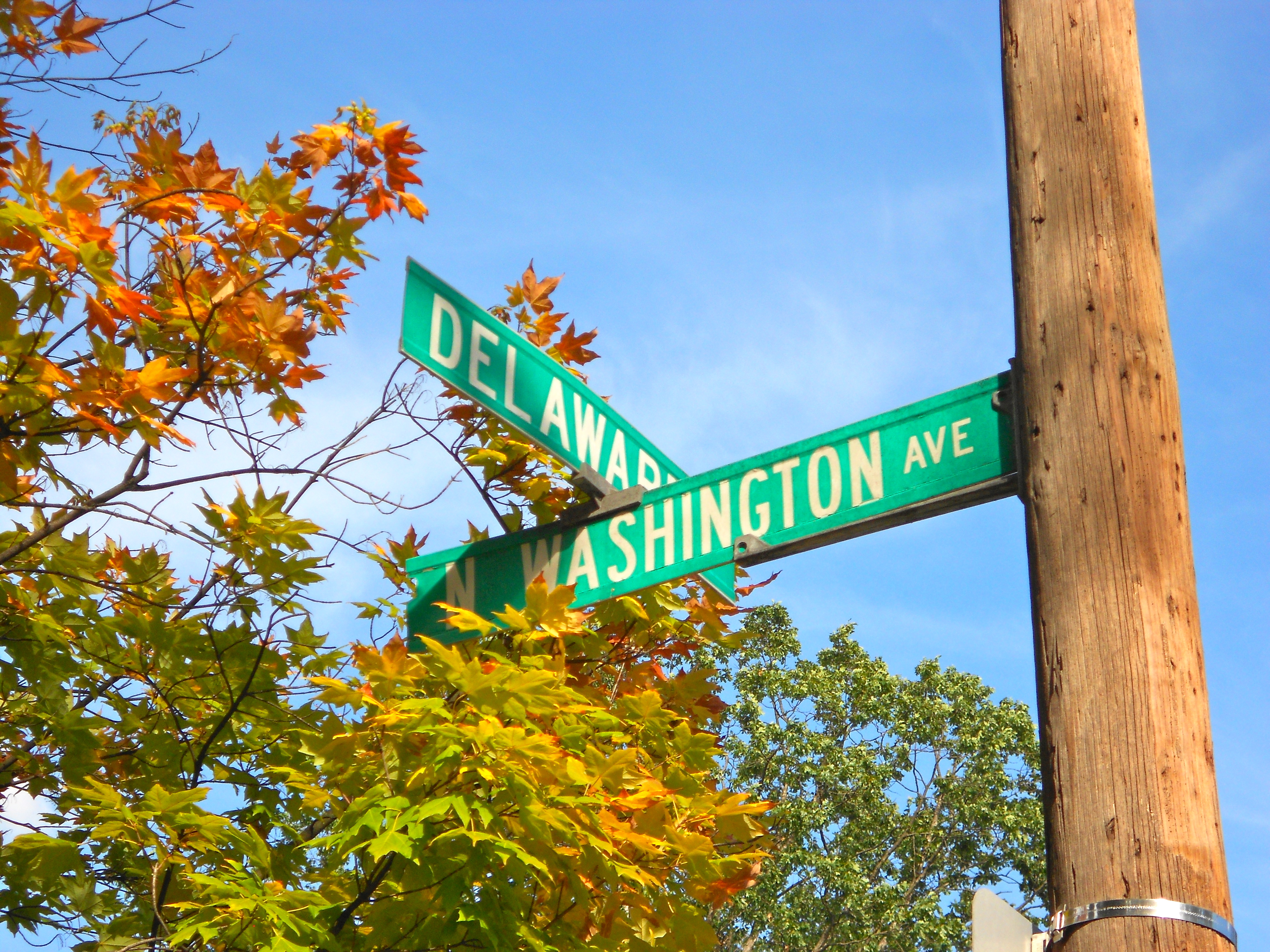
Washington crossing the Delaware

== See also ==
- Japanese rebus monogram
- Slapstick
