= Hair receiver =

Pot for storing hair removed from brushes and combs

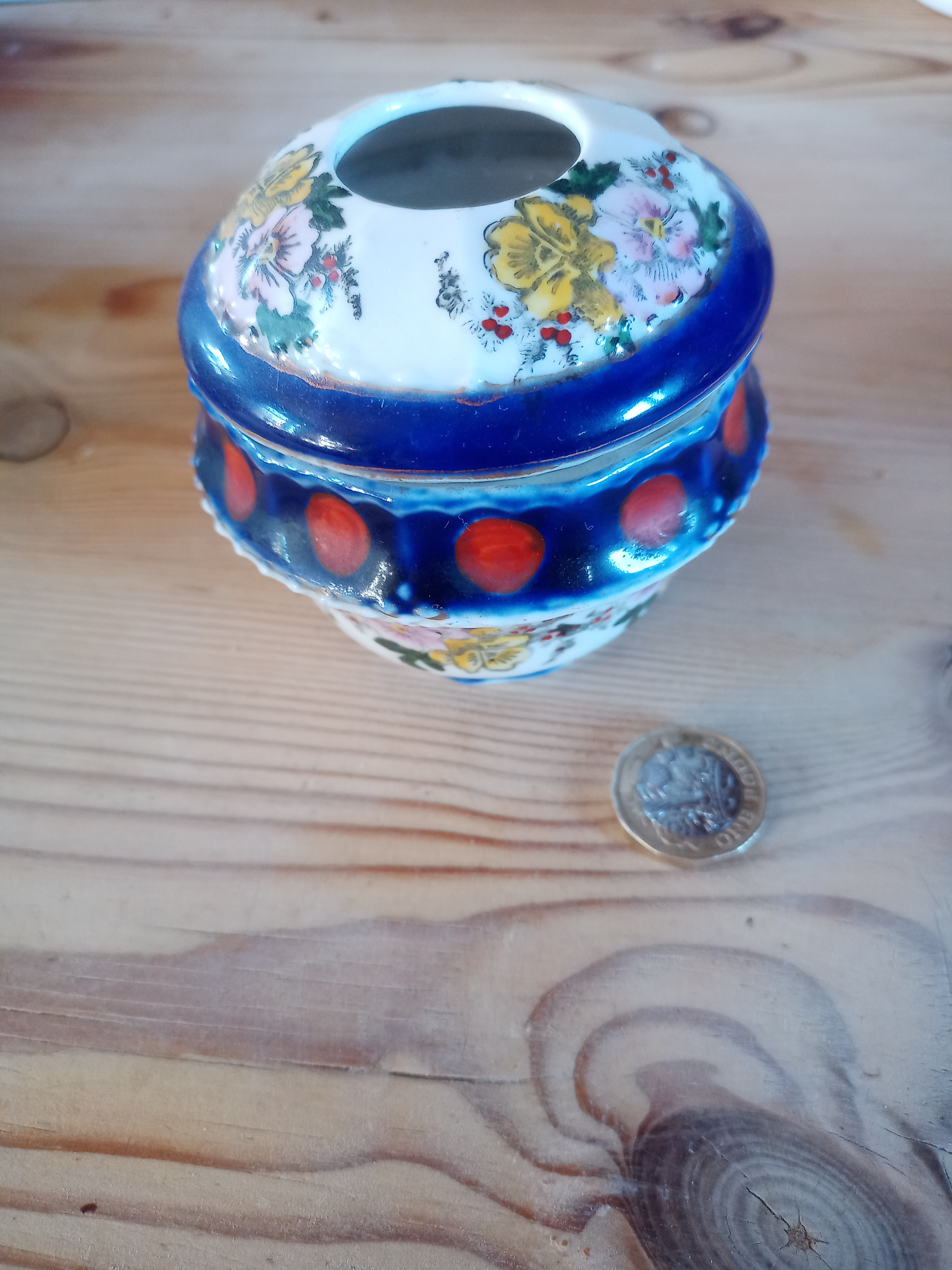
A hair receiver, no maker's mark, at least 100 years old from Wales

A hair receiver is a small pot, typically made of ceramic, bronze, or crystal, with a hole in the lid, kept on the dressing table in the Victorian era to store hair removed from brushes and combs. Women saved the collected hair as material for creating fuller hairstyles and filling small household objects.

== History and cultural context ==
Staci Fromwiller explains that before the mid-19th century, hair intended for hairwork was stored in cloth bags. She dates the production of dedicated porcelain and ceramic hair receivers to the second half of the 19th century.

== Uses of collected hair ==
=== Hairstyling and hair rats ===
Hair receivers were receptacles with a finger-wide hole in the top to allow for the collected hair to be fed into the box. The hair collected in these receivers was recycled in a number of ways, notably for stuffing small bags, about 8–10 centimetres (3–4 in) across, called ratts (or rats), used to bulk out women's hairstyles. These ratts could also be made by weaving or plaiting the collected hair. These ratts helped in achieving the high and filled-out hairstyles which were fashionable in the Victorian era. McLeod describes making a ratt by filling a sheer hairnet with collected hair until it was approximately potato-sized, then sewing it tightly closed.

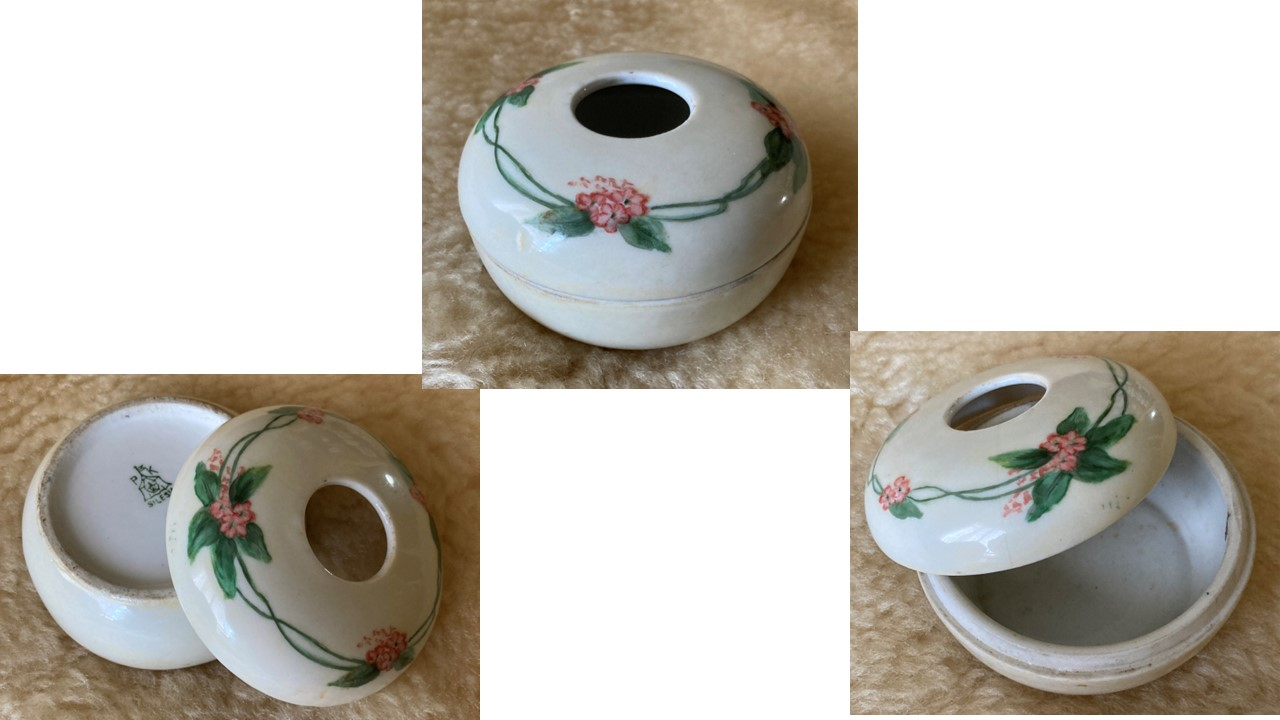

=== Household stuffing ===
Hair in hair receivers was used for stuffing pincushions and small furnishing cushions. McLeod explains that residual oils on the hair lubricated pins, helping them pass through fabric. Hair was also used as pillow stuffing because it was less prickly than feathers containing quills.

== Materials and design ==
These receivers were often paired with a matching trinket box or a powder jar or as part of a dressing table set, made mainly from porcelain, though glass, metal, and celluloid were also used. Glass receivers were often topped with silver or silver plate. They were most commonly round or oval.

Fromwiller also describes receivers made from wood and glass examples with brass tops. Less common shapes represented animals or other figures. Some receivers stood on legs or pedestals, although most had flat bases. Porcelain examples could have hand-painted floral decoration.

In a personal essay, Alison Condie Jaenicke describes a porcelain hair receiver preserved by her family in the shape of a woman's shoe, decorated in rose colours with gold details.

Receivers were produced individually as well as in coordinated dresser sets. Other pieces could include a powder jar, hatpin holder, brush, comb, nail buffer, and tray. Homer Watson House & Gallery documents a receiver hand-painted by Phoebe Watson and given to her niece as a wedding gift. It was paired with a dressing-table tray, powder shaker, and cosmetic container.

== Relationship to hairwork ==
Published accounts differ on whether hair collected in receivers was used for decorative hairwork. In a 2006 Chicago Tribune feature about Leila's Hair Museum, Diana Lambdin Meyer describes receivers as containers for hair gathered from brushes and combs until enough had accumulated to make jewellery. In Women's Wear Daily, Jennifer Hirshlag reports hair artist Sandra Johnson's account that an antique porcelain hair receiver prompted her research into the use of saved hair for jewellery.

McLeod reports a different interpretation from Lori Verge, curator of Surratt House Museum. Verge explains that hair jewellery and mourning objects required straight, untangled hair and suggests that cut hair, rather than tangled hair removed from brushes, was used for these purposes.

== Later use and preservation ==
The use of hair receivers fell into decline in the early 20th century, with shorter hairstyles becoming more fashionable.

McLeod reports that Surratt House Museum curator Lori Verge's grandmother used a hair receiver as late as the 1950s. Jaenicke likewise describes their use from Victorian times through that decade. Writing in 2003, McLeod also describes hair receivers as collectible antiques.
