= Good Design =

Artistic movement

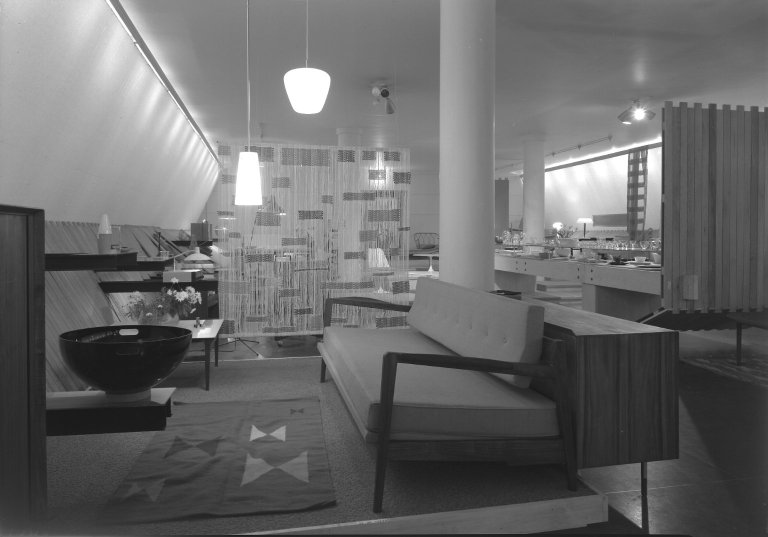
Design for the Home Exhibition. 1958. Brooklyn Museum

The Good Design movement was an artistic movement or design concept that originated in the 1930s, but took form principally in the United States immediately after the Second World War. Designs made under the influence of Good Design include buildings and furniture, but also everyday objects such as kitchen implements, household objects and garden tools. Names associated with the movement include Charles and Ray Eames, László Moholy-Nagy and Hans Wegner,

The Museum of Modern Art of New York was an influential force on the movement. A major exhibition, Good Design, was held there from 23 September to 30 November 1952. The retrospective exhibition What Was Good Design? MoMA's Message, 1944–56 was also held at MoMA, from 6 May 2009 to 10 January 2011.
