= Buttonhook =

Device for pulling buttons through their holes

A boot buttonhook or buttonhook is a metal hook on a handle with a grip, which was used to pull buttons, usually on boots or gloves, more easily through the corresponding buttonholes. Boot buttons were particularly popular in the Victorian era, when fashion dictated that women should wear buttoned boots made of stiff leather. Buttonhooks were usually about the size of a fork, but could be much smaller or larger, depending on whether they were for buttons on collars, gloves, corsets or boots. Those used for gloves were generally between two and three inches long, and were used to button the large number of buttons, up to 30, found on women's gloves. There also existed small folding buttonhooks, so that they could easily be carried in a woman's purse.

== Design ==
Buttonhook handles can be made using a variety of materials, including metal, ivory, bone, plastic, mother of pearl, and wood. They can also take one of several shapes, such as round or oval open loops, straight with or without design, or more substantial solids. Utilitarian handles made the buttonhooks inexpensive or free. Indeed, many businesses, particularly shoe stores, would give away free buttonhooks with their business name inscribed.

More expensive hooks would be much more ornate with intricate handles and made of more costly materials. Highly decorated buttonhooks were at times part of a dresser set, which might also include a brush and comb, shoe horn, clothes brush, and mirror. These dresser sets were meant to be displayed.

== History ==
Between 1880 and the First World War, boot buttons were an item that could be found in practically every household. Today they have become collector's items; there is a Buttonhook Society dedicated to collecting and displaying buttons.

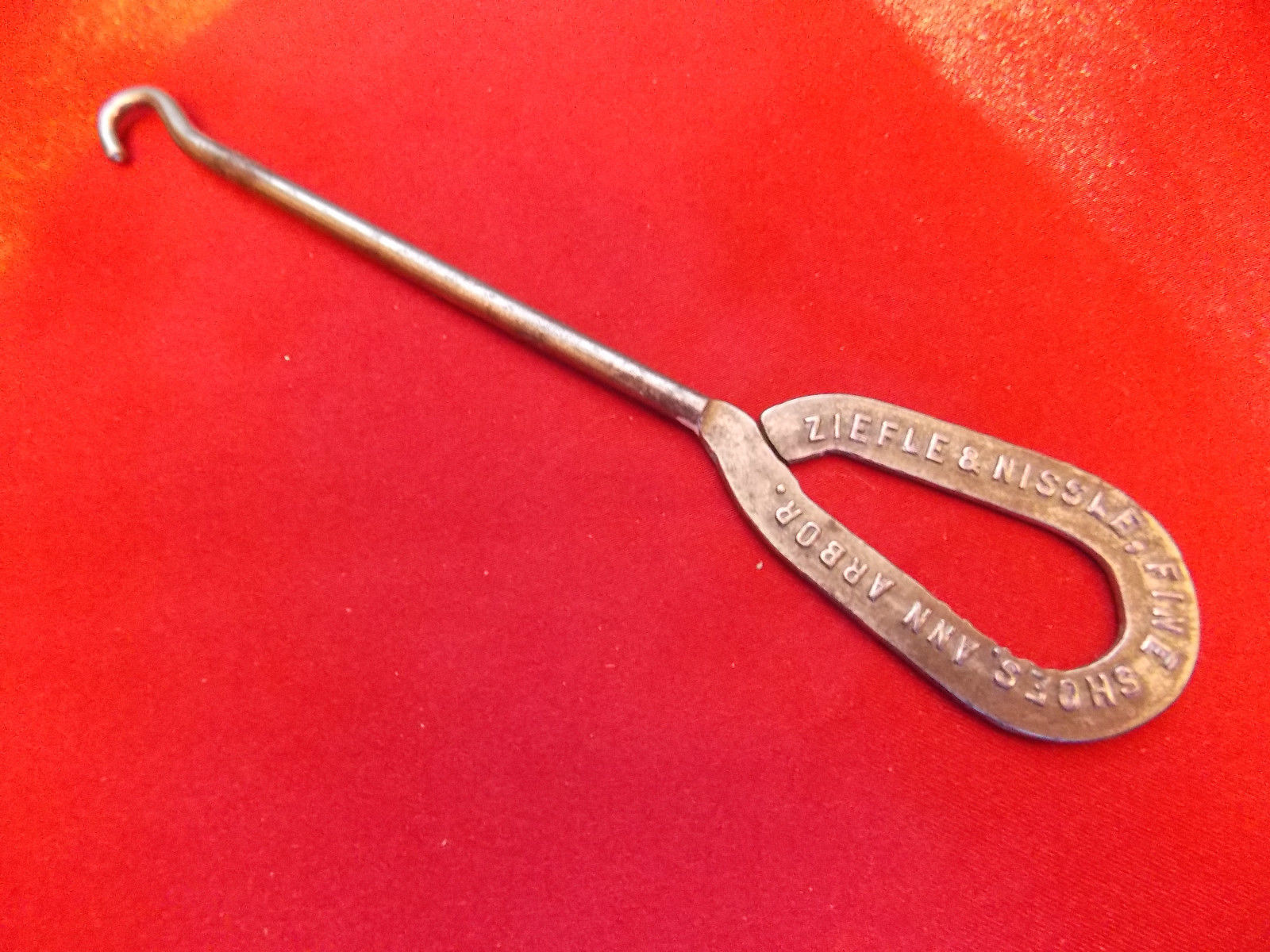
Early 20th-century buttonhook advertising a shoe shop in Michigan

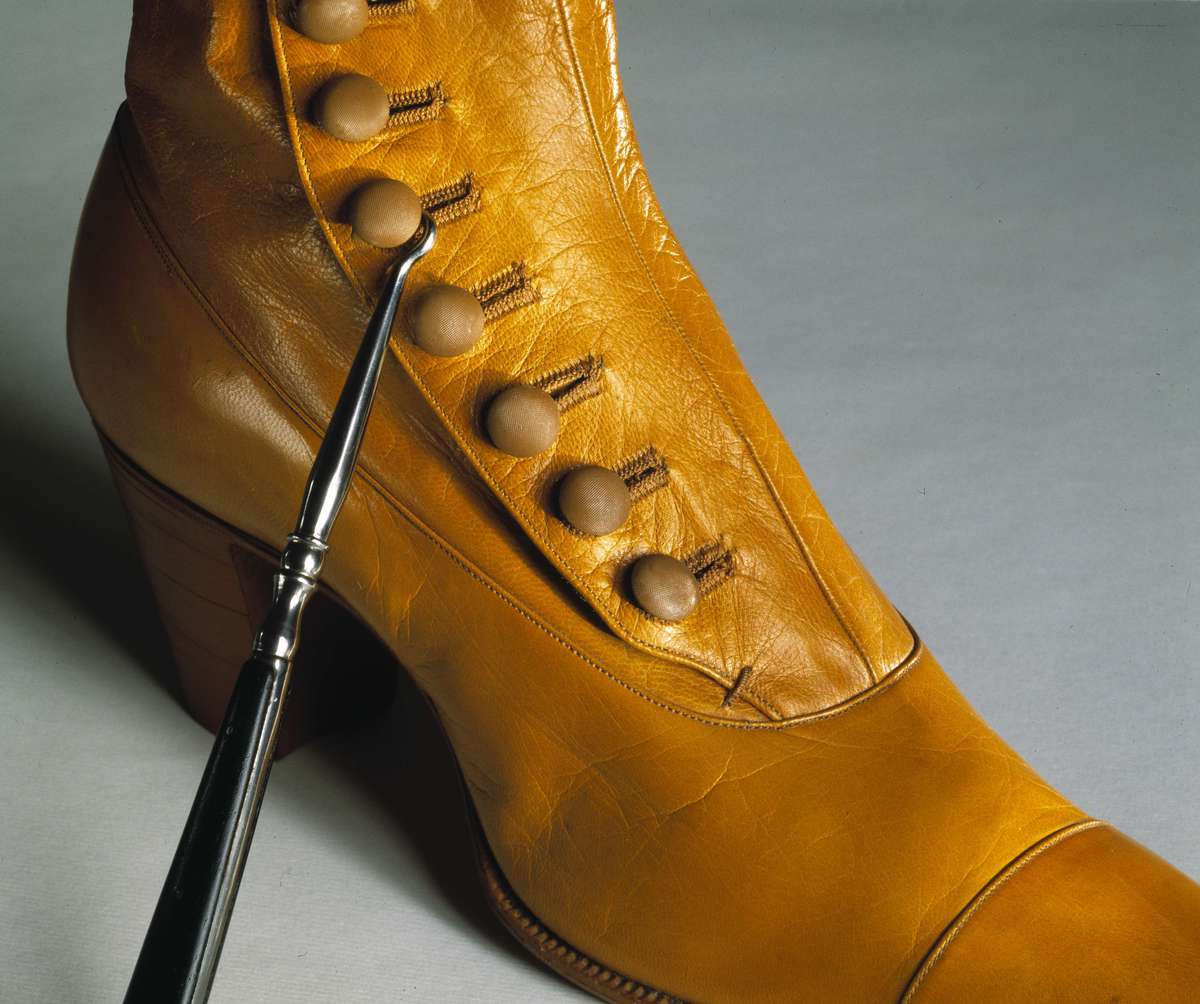
A buttonhook in use on a c. 1900 boot

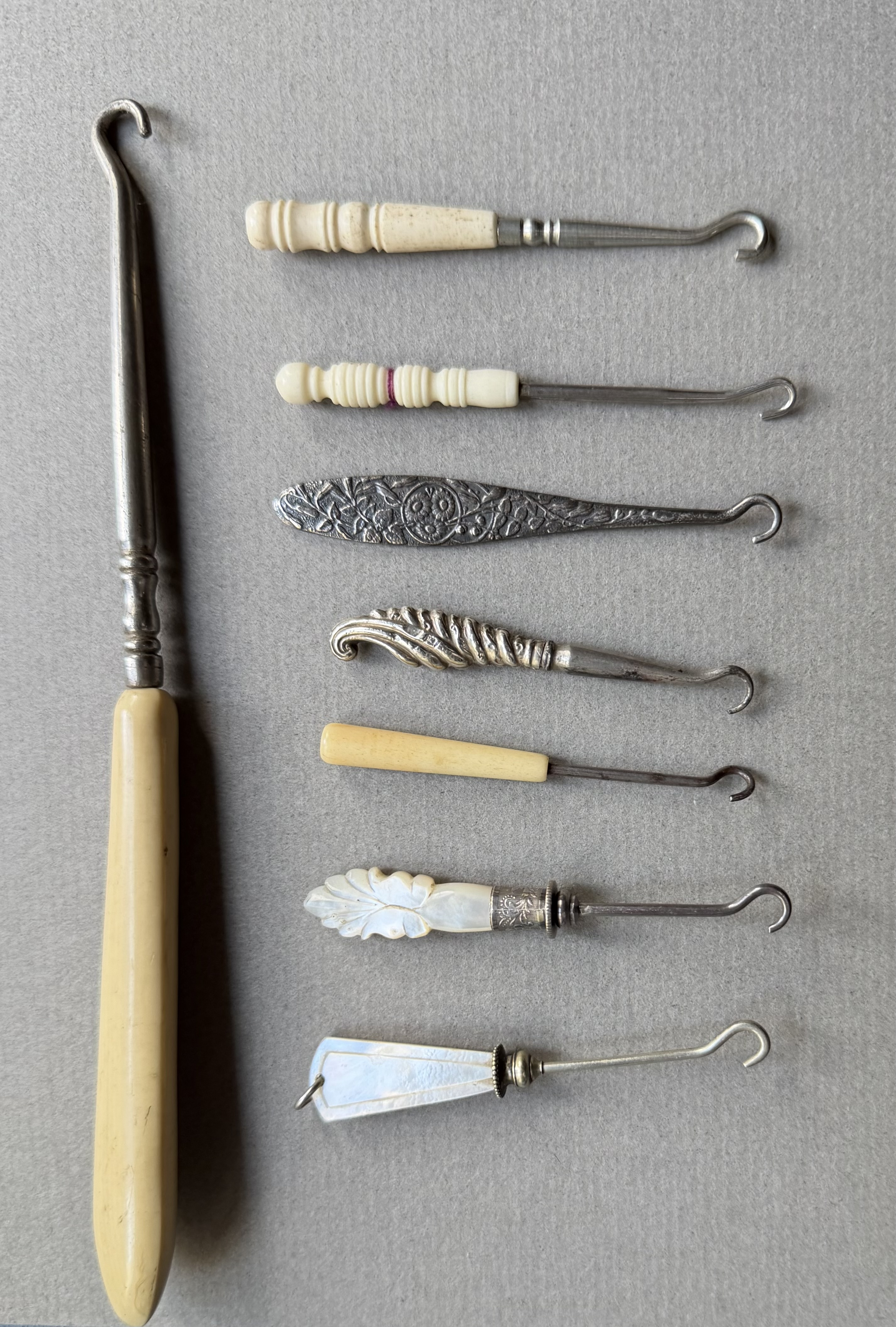
Small buttonhooks, from top: bone, plastic, metal (2), bakelite, mother of pearl (2)

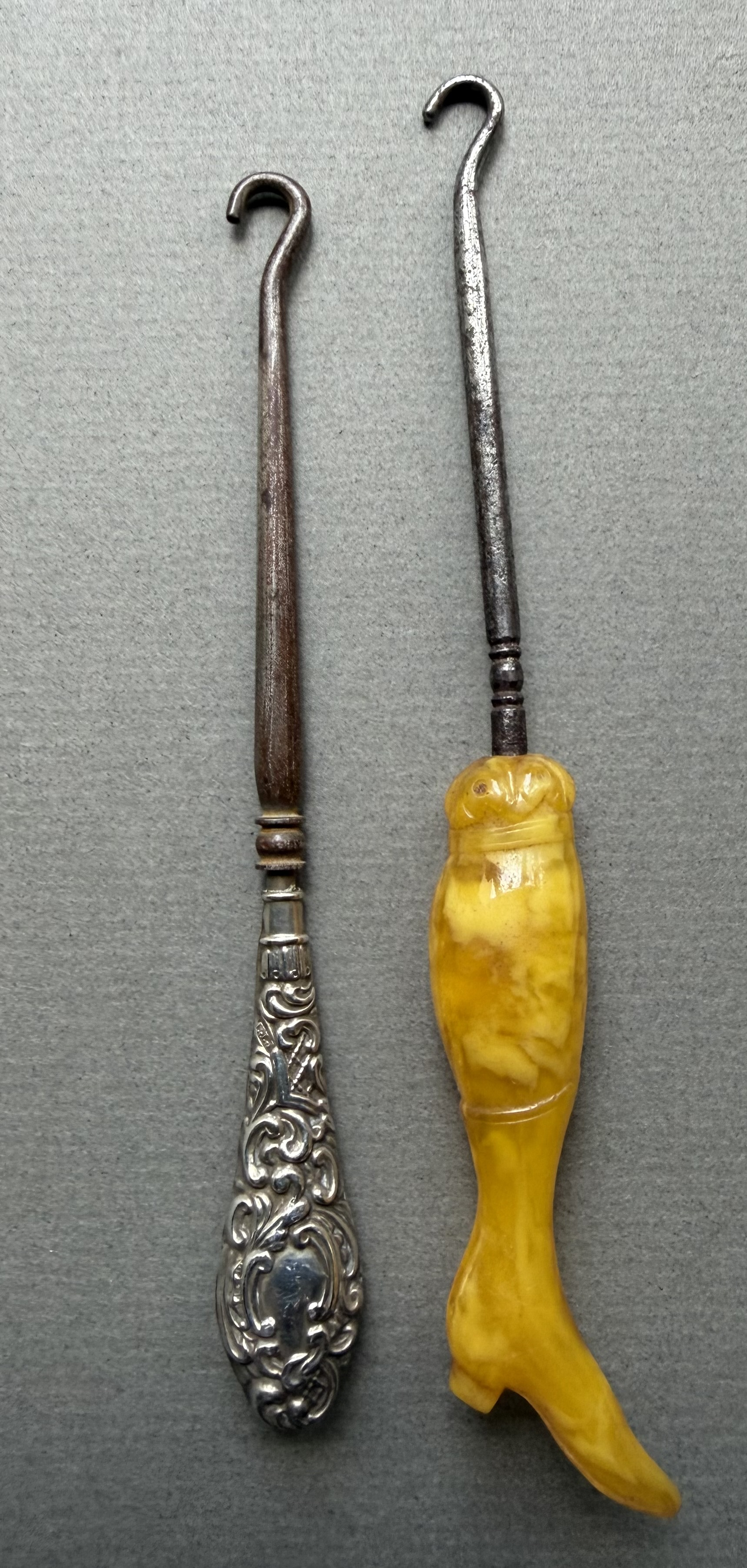
Buttonhooks with more ornate designs

== Buttonhooks on display at Bedford Museum & Art Gallery ==
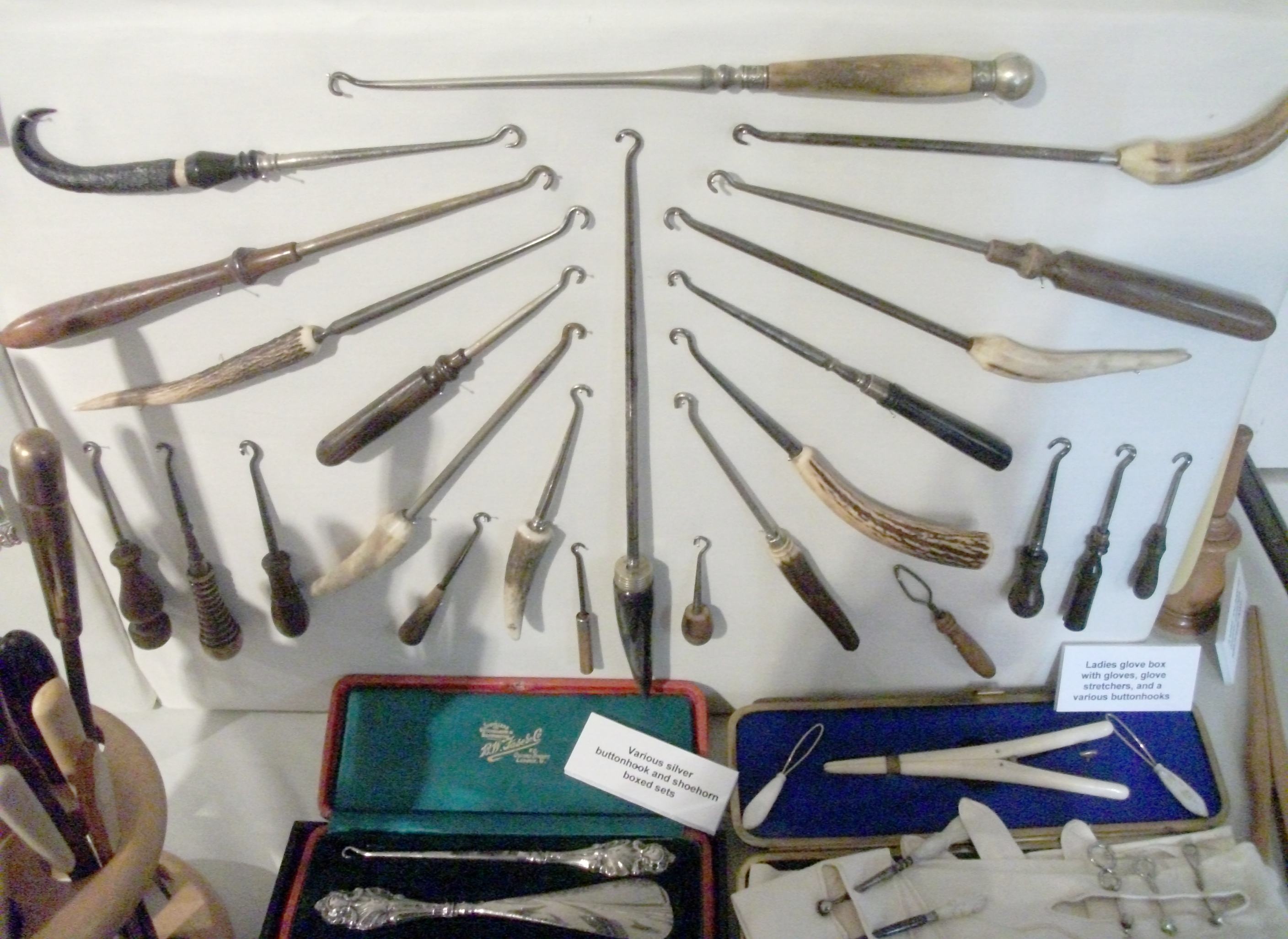
With handles of horn and wood

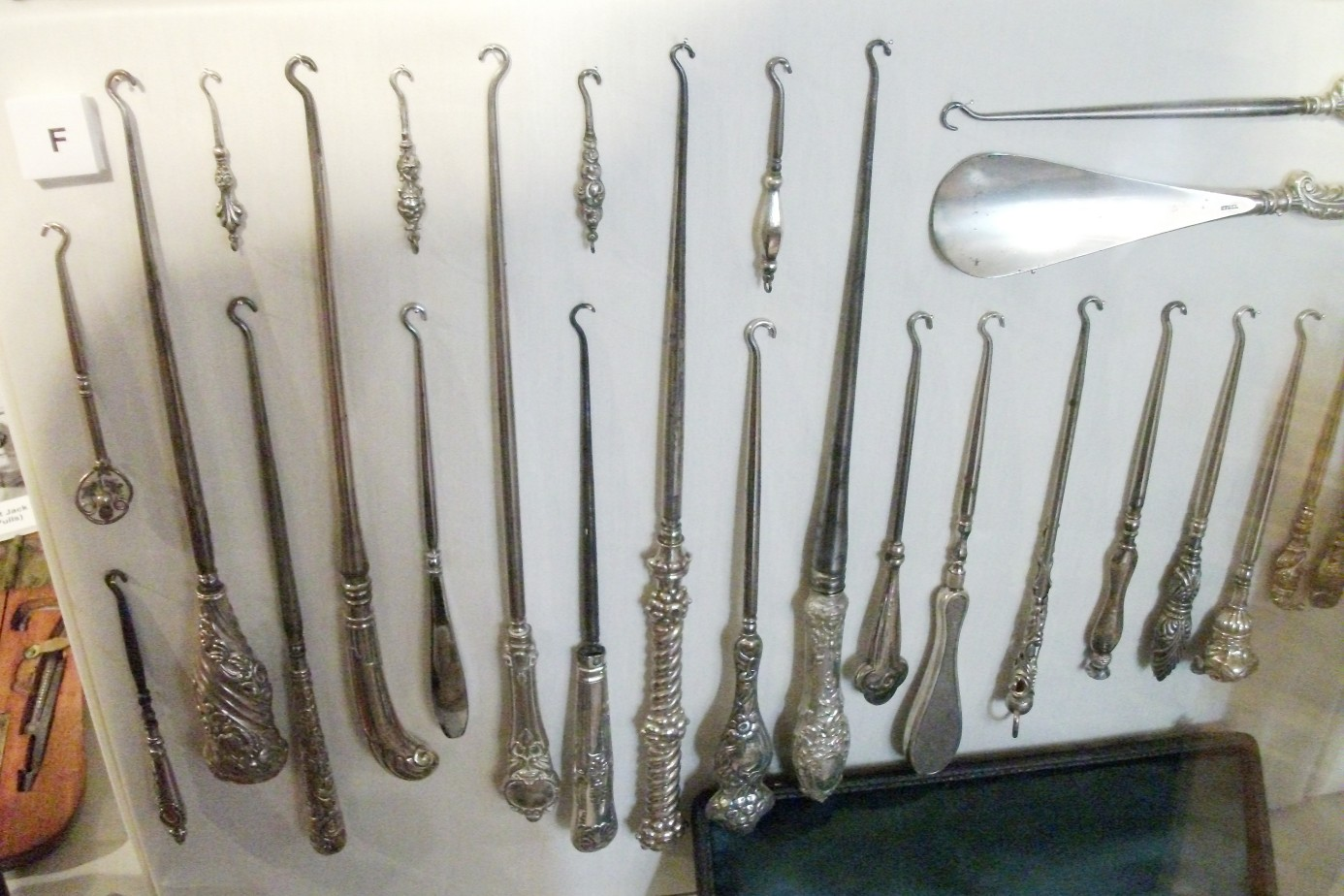
With handles of silver

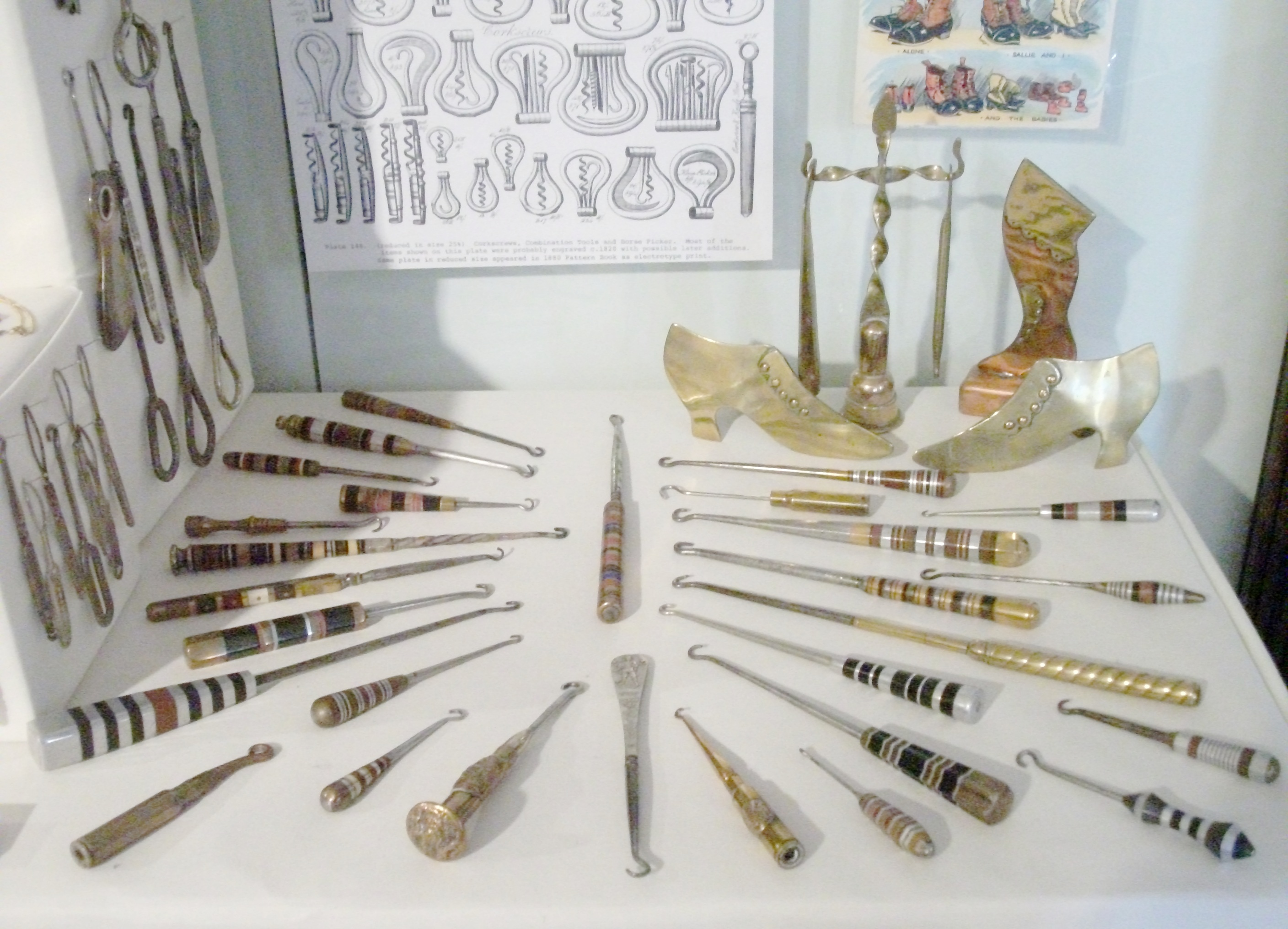
Trench art buttonhooks

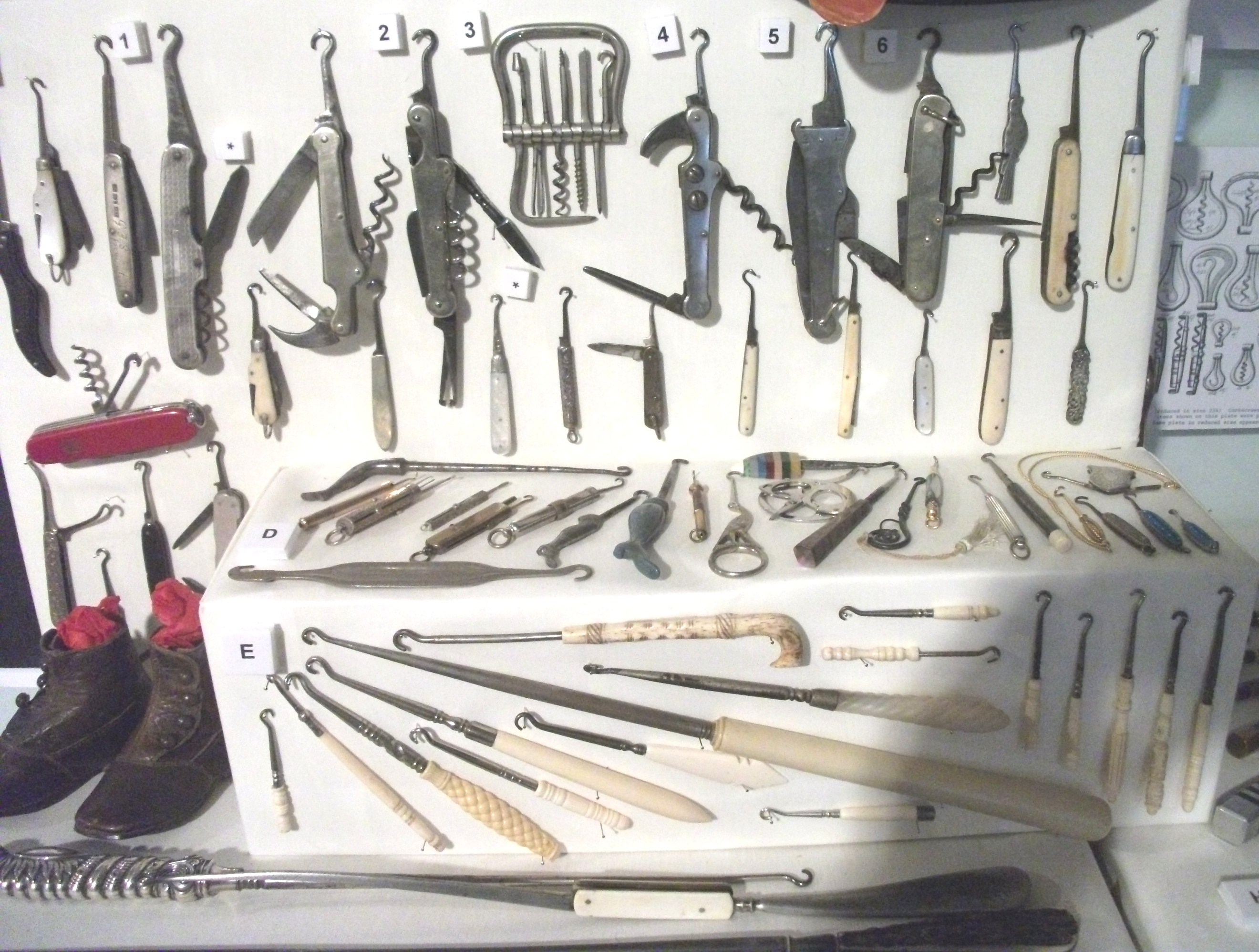
Pocket knives with buttonhooks
