= San Juan Capistrano, California =

City in California, United States

- City
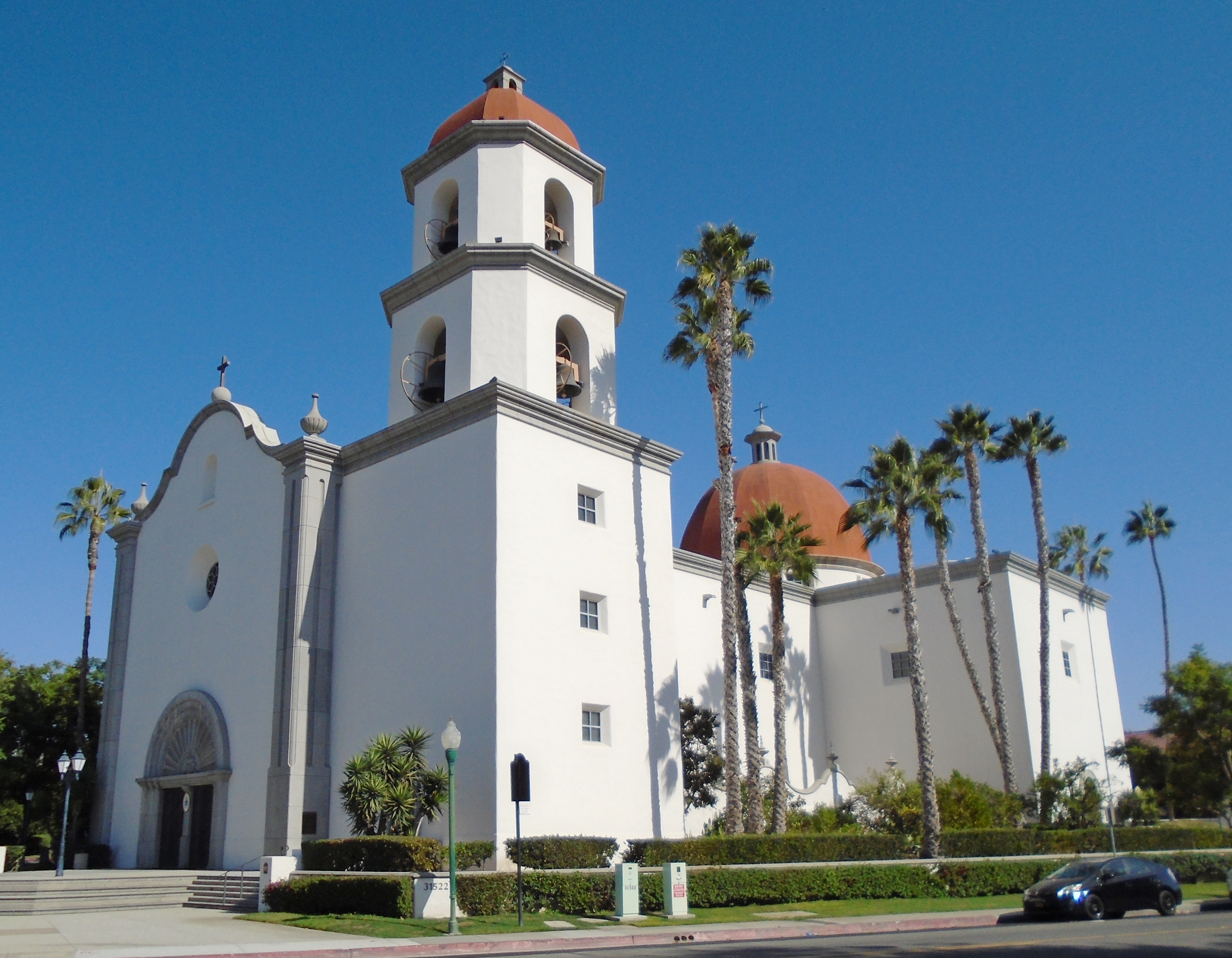
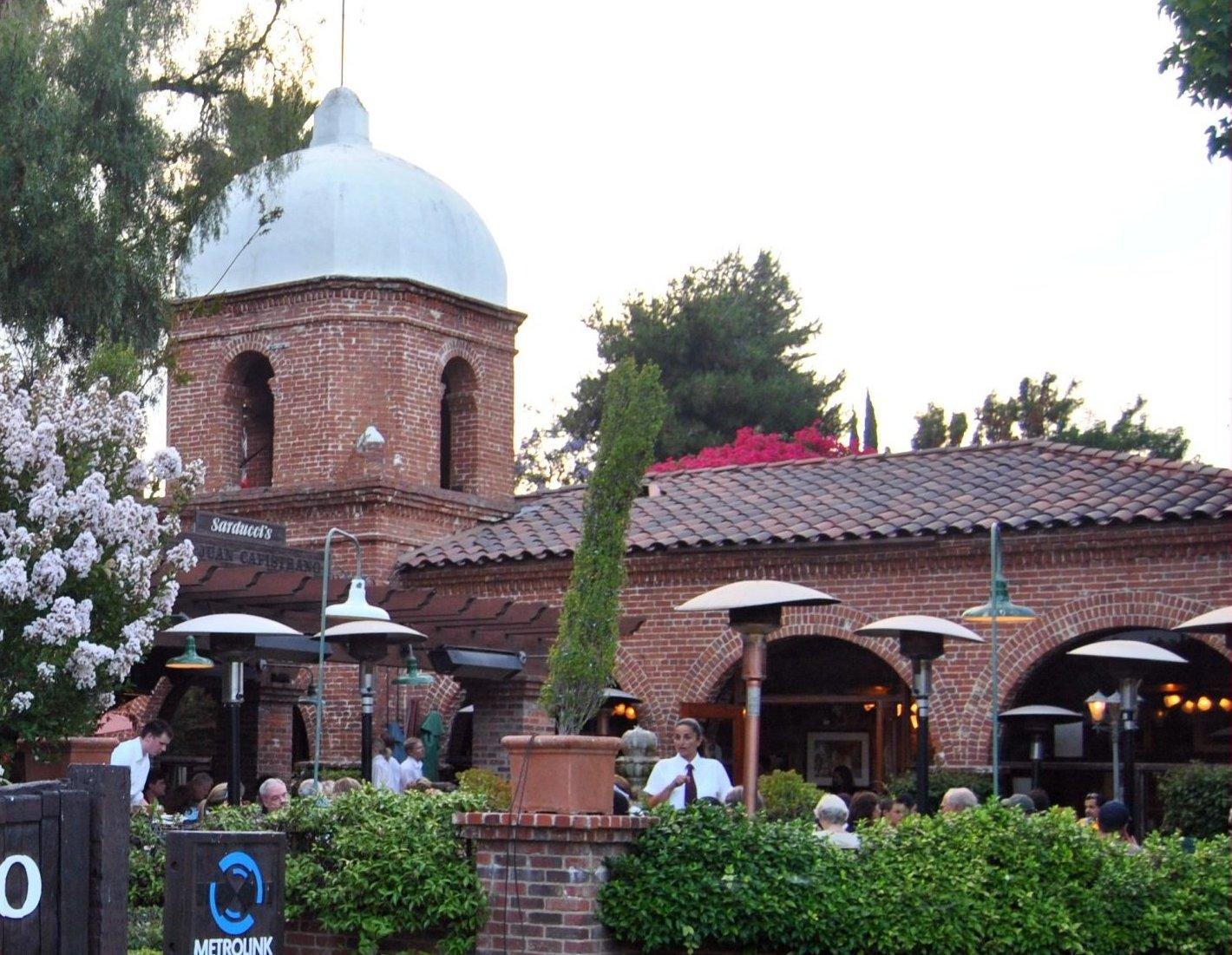
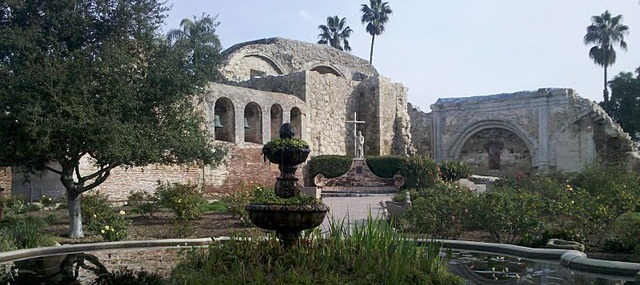
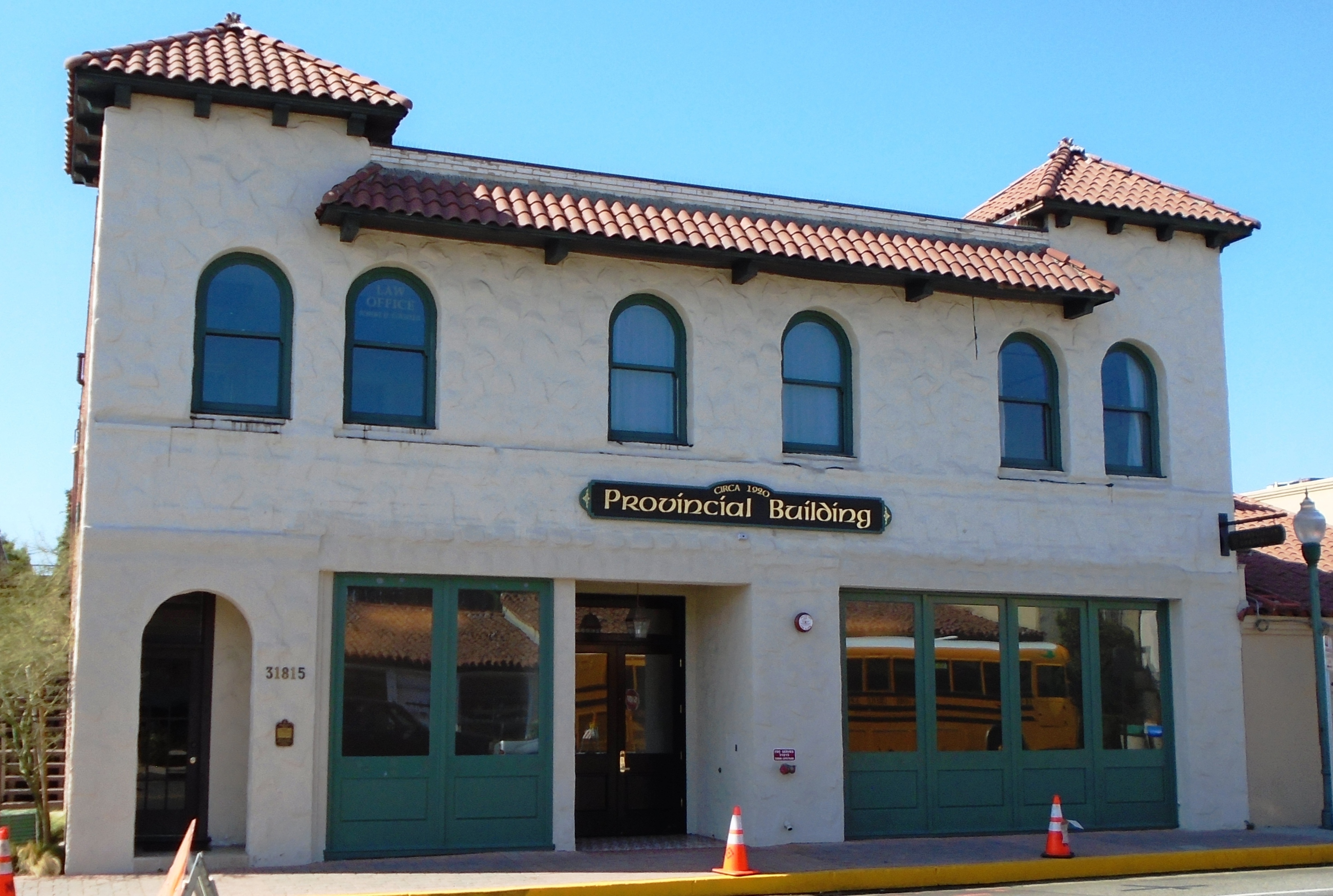
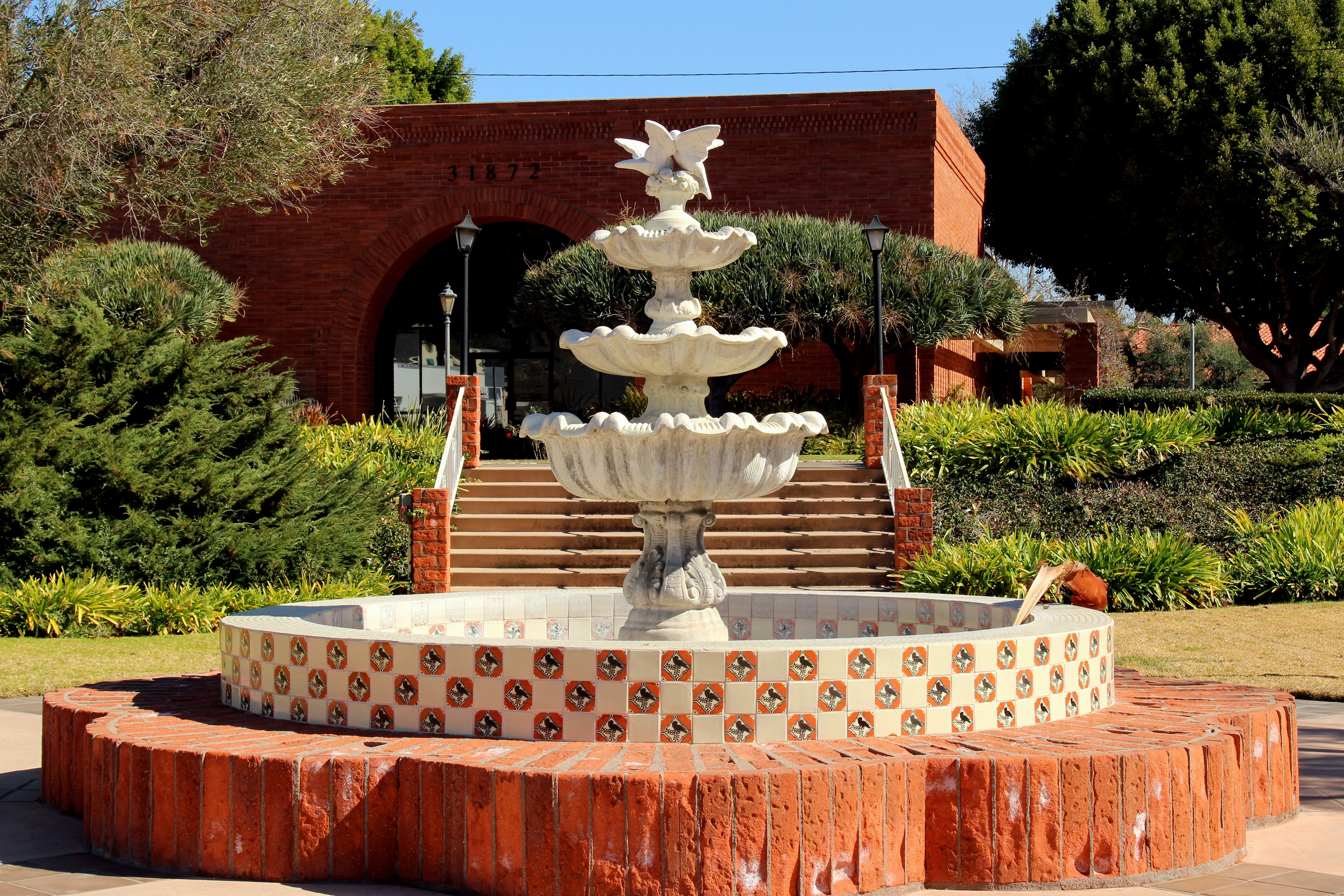
- Top: San Juan Mission Basilica (left), San Juan Capistrano station (right); middle: Mission San Juan Capistrano; bottom: Downtown San Juan Capistrano

- Seal
- Motto: "Preserving The Past To Enhance The Future"
- Interactive map of San Juan Capistrano, California
- Location in the United States
- Coordinates: 33°29′58″N 117°39′42″W
- Country: United States
- State: California
- County: Orange
- Founded: November 1, 1776
- Incorporated: April 19, 1961
- Named for: John of Capistrano

Government
  - Type: Council-Manager
  - Mayor: Troy A. Bourne
  - Mayor Pro Tem: John Campbell
  - City Council: Sergio Farias; Howard Hart; John Taylor
  - City manager: Benjamin Siegel

Area
  - Total: 14.43 sq mi (37.37 km^{2})
  - Land: 14.43 sq mi (37.37 km^{2})
  - Water: 0 sq mi (0.00 km^{2})
- Elevation: 121 ft (37 m)

Population (2020)
  - Total: 35,196
  - Density: 2,439.3/sq mi (941.82/km^{2})
- Time zone: UTC-8 (Pacific)
  - Summer (DST): UTC-7 (PDT)
- ZIP Code: 92675
- Area code: 949
- FIPS code: 06-68028
- GNIS feature IDs: 1661383, 2411793
- Website: sanjuancapistrano.gov

San Juan Capistrano (san hwaan cap-ih-STRAH-noh; also known colloquially as San Juan or SJC) is a city in southern Orange County, California, United States. The population was 35,253 at the 2020 Census.

Named for Saint John of Capistrano, San Juan Capistrano was founded by the Spanish in 1776, when Father Junípero Serra established Mission San Juan Capistrano. Extensive damage caused by an earthquake in 1812 caused the community to decline. Following the Mexican secularization act of 1833, the mission village officially became a town and was briefly renamed as San Juan de Argüello. After the American conquest of California, San Juan remained a small, rural town until the 20th century; the restoration of the mission in the 1910s–20s transformed the town into a tourist destination and a backdrop for Hollywood films.

== History ==
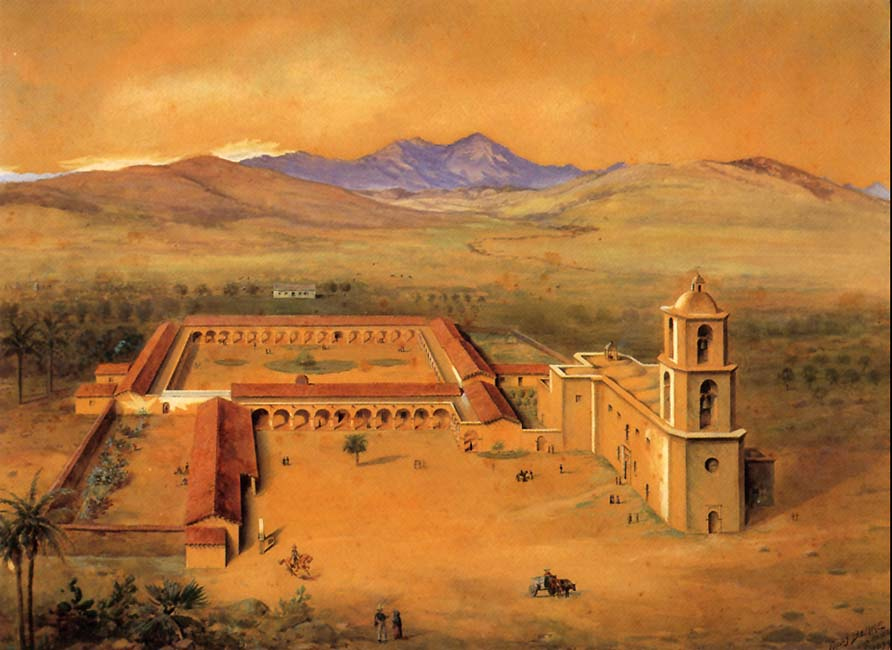
The Spanish founded San Juan Capistrano in 1776, when Saint Junípero Serra established Mission San Juan Capistrano.

=== Indigenous ===
The region was populated by the Acjachemen, referred to by the Spanish as Juaneños, an Indigenous Californian nation. They lived in the area for approximately 10,000 years, with some of their oldest villages being confirmed as over 9,600 years old. The mother village of Putuidem was located in what is now San Juan Capistrano, as well as the village of Acjacheme.

=== Spanish era ===
The settlement that today is San Juan Capistrano began in 1776 when the Spanish Franciscan missionary Junípero Serra founded Mission San Juan Capistrano, the seventh of the Spanish missions in California. The mission was built less than 60 yards from the native village of Acjacheme, which was exploited as a source of labor for the mission. The mission was named after Saint John of Capistrano, a 14th-15th century Franciscan saint. The 1812 San Juan Capistrano earthquake resulted in the deaths of thirty-nine Acjachemen people, thirty-one of whom were women, when the stone church at the Mission collapsed.

=== Mexican era ===
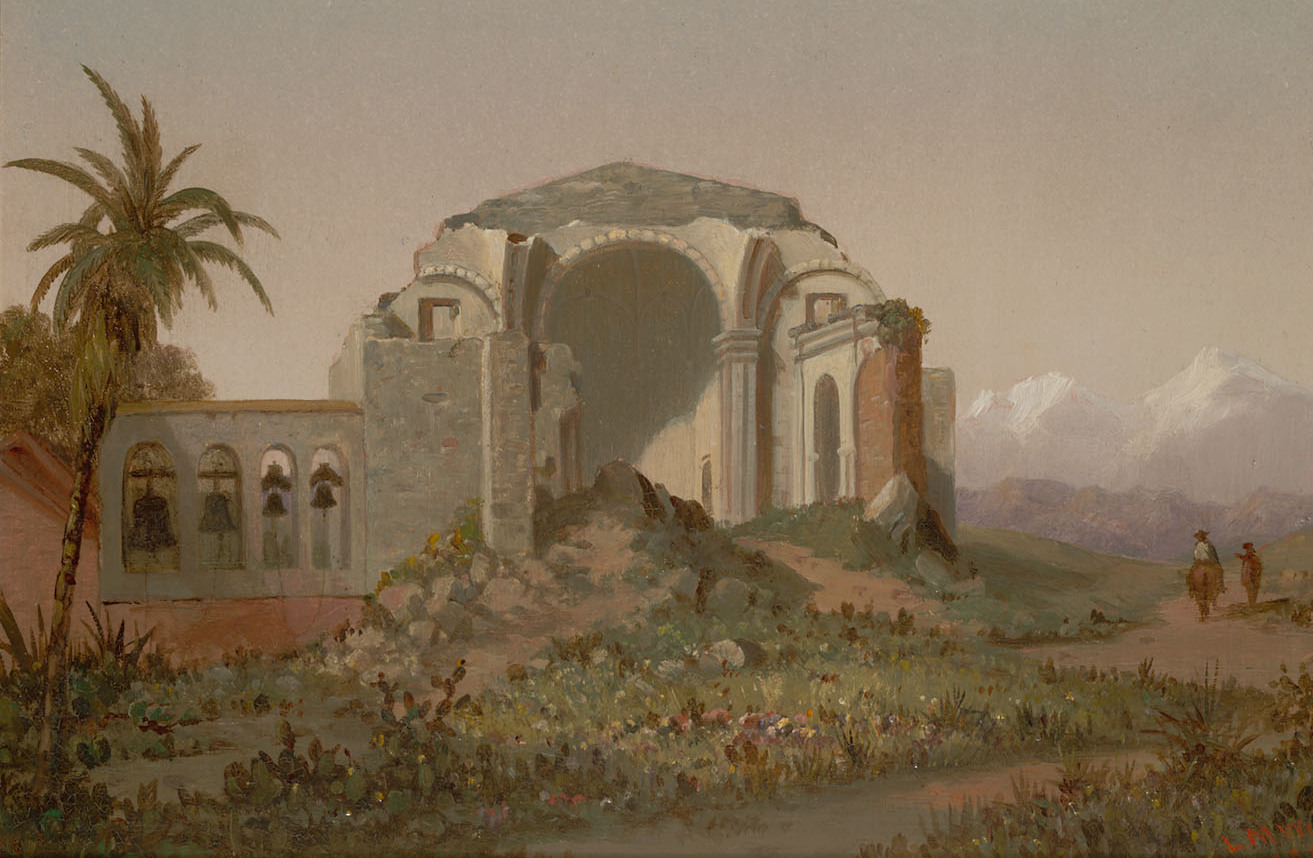
Ruins of the Great Stone Church at Mission San Juan Capistrano, 1876

The Mexican Congress of the Union enacted the secularization of the Californian missions in 1833. In the mission period, 4,317 natives had been baptized at the mission (1,689 adults and 2,628 children). In that same period, 3,158 of those baptized had died. Some of the native people who survived the mission period continued to live at the mission for a short period after the secularization act, while others settled in the surrounding areas.

Each mission was appointed an administrator to oversee the transfer of the missions and their lands from the Franciscan Order to the Mexican authorities. Santiago Argüello, a member of a prominent family of Californios, was appointed administrator of Mission San Juan Capistrano. During his tenure, the community was briefly renamed "San Juan de Argüello", similar to what happened to San Juan Bautista in Northern California, which was briefly renamed "San Juan de Castro" after its administrator José Castro.

In 1844, Don Juan Forster and James McKinley purchased the former Mission San Juan Capistrano at public auction. Forster made his home there until 1864, when the mission was returned to the Catholic Church by President Abraham Lincoln.

=== American era ===
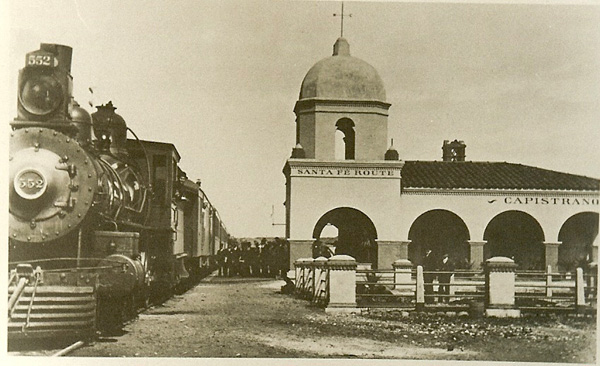
San Juan Capistrano station, 1895

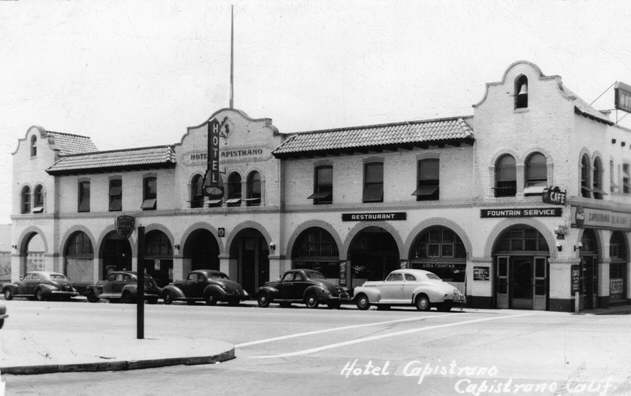
San Juan Capistrano in the 1940s

Following the American Conquest of California, San Juan remained a relatively small and rural community until the end of the 19th century. Then it was considered an American town and incorporated into Orange County in 1876.

Padre O'Sullivan arrived in San Juan Capistrano in 1910 to recuperate from a recent stroke. He became fascinated by Mission San Juan Capistrano and soon set to work on rebuilding it a section at a time. O'Sullivan repaired the roof of the Serra Chapel using California sycamore logs to match those that were used in the original work. He brought in architect Arthur B. Benton of Los Angeles to strengthen the chapel walls through the addition of heavy masonry buttresses. The centerpiece of the chapel restoration was its retablo, imported from Barcelona in 1806 and donated by the Bishop of Los Angeles.

The restoration of the mission resulted in the town's emergence as a tourist destination, owing to its historic architectural style and proximity to the sea. The mission was used often in Hollywood productions, such as D. W. Griffith's 1910 western film The Two Brothers, the first film ever shot in Orange County. San Juan was incorporated as a city on April 19, 1961.

From 2009 to 2017, the cliff swallows did not make their famous annual springtime return to Mission San Juan Capistrano, instead migrating to the Chino Hills, north of San Juan. The swallows changed their route because the Mission is no longer the tallest building in the area due to urban sprawl, and thus stopped attracting the swallows for nesting. Mission San Juan Capistrano embarked on a program to facilitate the return of the swallows, first by using swallow calls to attract the birds and then by building artificial swallow nests for the birds to use. As of 2017, the swallows have returned home to Mission San Juan Capistrano and are still celebrated each year at the town's annual Swallows Day Parade and Mercado Street Fair. In 2018, the town celebrated its 80th annual Swallows Day Parade and Fiesta de las Golondrinas (Spanish: Festival of the Swallows).

== Geography ==
San Juan Capistrano

Climate chart (precipitation, max. and min. temperature)
J	F	M	A	M	J	J	A	S	O	N	D
3.1 65 50	3.3 66 50	1.8 66 52	0.8 68 54	0.4 70 57	0.1 73 60	0.1 76 63	0.1 78 63	0.2 77 62	0.6 74 59	0.8 69 53	2.2 65 49
- █ Average max. and min. temperatures in °F
- █ Precipitation totals in inches
Metric conversion
J	F	M	A	M	J	J	A	S	O	N	D
77 18 10	84 19 10	46 19 11	21 20 12	9.4 21 14	3 23 16	3 24 17	3 26 17	6.1 25 17	15 23 15	21 21 12	56 18 9
- █ Average max. and min. temperatures in °C
- █ Precipitation totals in mm

San Juan Capistrano is located in south Orange County and is bisected by Interstate 5.

According to the United States Census Bureau, the city has a total area of 14.4 square miles (37 km^{2}), all land.

=== Biogeography (San Juan Capistrano) ===
The most common native species: Common Yarrow, Red Sand Verbena, and Pink Sand Verbena.

=== Climate ===
Climate data for San Juan Capistrano, California
Month	Jan	Feb	Mar	Apr	May	Jun	Jul	Aug	Sep	Oct	Nov	Dec	Year
Record high °F (°C)	93 (34)	94 (34)	96 (36)	101 (38)	101 (38)	107 (42)	110 (43)	104 (40)	116 (47)	108 (42)	99 (37)	93 (34)	116 (47)
Mean daily maximum °F (°C)	65 (18)	66 (19)	66 (19)	68 (20)	70 (21)	73 (23)	76 (24)	78 (26)	77 (25)	74 (23)	69 (21)	65 (18)	71 (22)
Mean daily minimum °F (°C)	50 (10)	50 (10)	52 (11)	54 (12)	57 (14)	60 (16)	63 (17)	63 (17)	62 (17)	59 (15)	53 (12)	49 (9)	56 (13)
Record low °F (°C)	25 (−4)	30 (−1)	32 (0)	33 (1)	39 (4)	44 (7)	48 (9)	47 (8)	45 (7)	38 (3)	35 (2)	28 (−2)	25 (−4)
Average precipitation inches (mm)	3.05 (77)	3.31 (84)	1.83 (46)	0.83 (21)	0.37 (9.4)	0.12 (3.0)	0.12 (3.0)	0.12 (3.0)	0.24 (6.1)	0.61 (15)	0.83 (21)	2.20 (56)	13.63 (344.5)

== Demographics ==
Historical population
Census	Pop.	Note	%±
1880	376		—
1960	1,120		—
1970	3,781		237.6%
1980	18,959		401.4%
1990	26,183		38.1%
2000	33,826		29.2%
2010	34,593		2.3%
2020	35,196		1.7%
U.S. Decennial Census; 1860–1870 1880-1890; 1900 1910 1920; 1930 1940 1950; 1960 1970 1980; 1990 2000 2010; 2020

San Juan Capistrano was first listed as an unincorporated place in the 1960 U.S. census as part of the South Coast census county division; and after incorporation, as a city in the 1970 U.S. census.

=== Racial and ethnic composition ===
San Juan Capistrano city, California – Racial and ethnic composition Note: the US Census treats Hispanic/Latino as an ethnic category. This table excludes Latinos from the racial categories and assigns them to a separate category. Hispanics/Latinos may be of any race.
Race / Ethnicity (NH = Non-Hispanic)	Pop 1980	Pop 1990	Pop 2000	Pop 2010	Pop 2020	% 1980	% 1990	% 2000	% 2010	% 2020
White alone (NH)	16,484	19,755	21,084	19,312	18,591	86.95%	75.45%	62.33%	55.83%	52.82%
Black or African American alone (NH)	5	88	151	146	139	0.03%	0.34%	0.45%	0.42%	0.39%
Native American or Alaska Native alone (NH)	250	127	169	156	106	1.32%	0.49%	0.50%	0.45%	0.30%
Asian alone (NH)	167	488	634	952	1,194	0.88%	1.86%	1.87%	2.75%	3.39%
Native Hawaiian or Pacific Islander alone (NH)	167	488	35	30	22	0.88%	1.86%	0.10%	0.09%	0.06%
Other race alone (NH)	4	22	27	43	147	0.02%	0.08%	0.08%	0.12%	0.42%
Mixed race or Multiracial (NH)	x	x	520	566	1,293	x	x	1.54%	1.64%	3.67%
Hispanic or Latino (any race)	2,049	5,703	11,206	13,388	13,704	10.81%	21.78%	33.13%	38.70%	38.94%
Total	18,959	26,183	33,826	34,953	35,196	100.00%	100.00%	100.00%	100.00%	100.00%

=== 2020 census ===
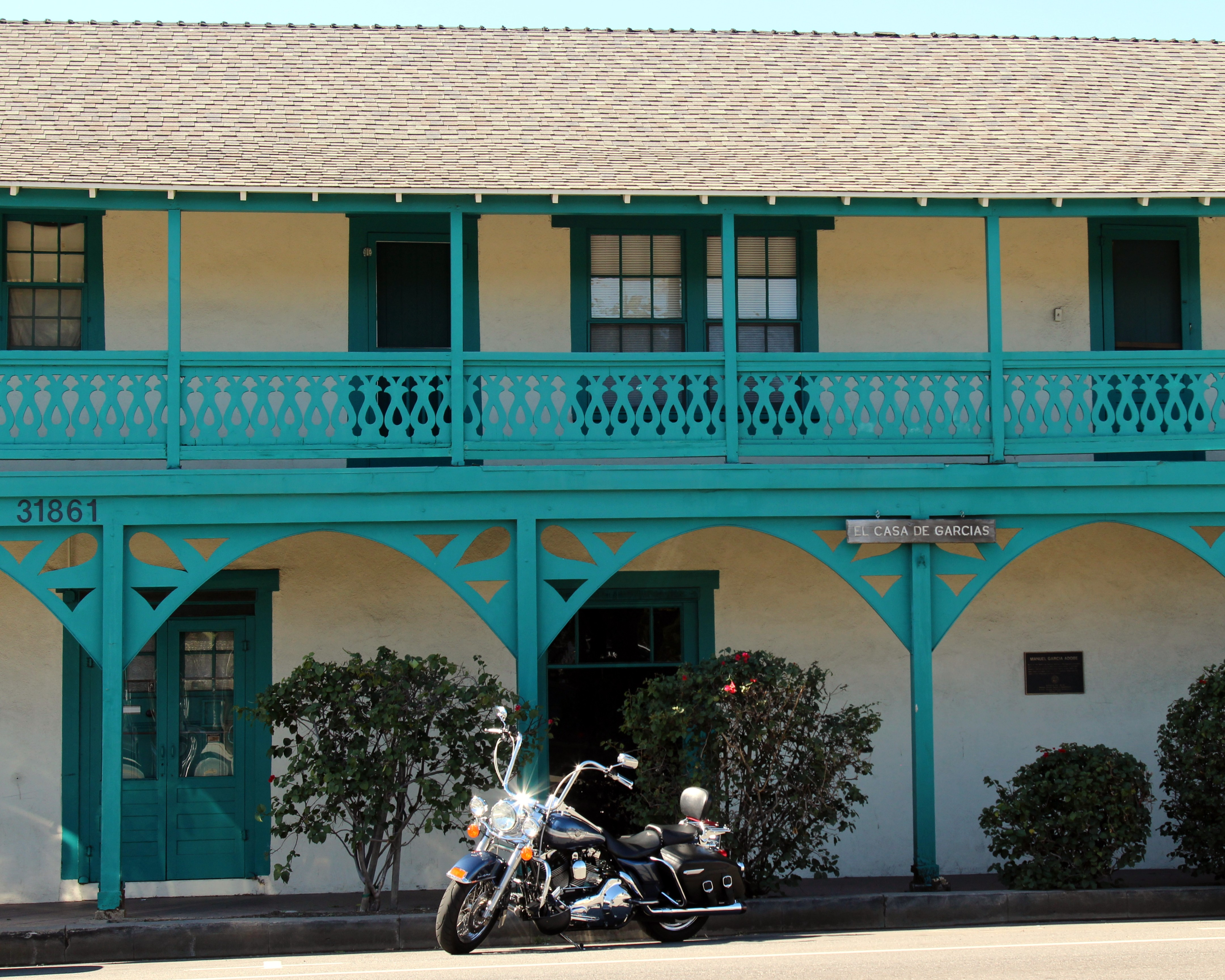
The historic Casa Manuel García.

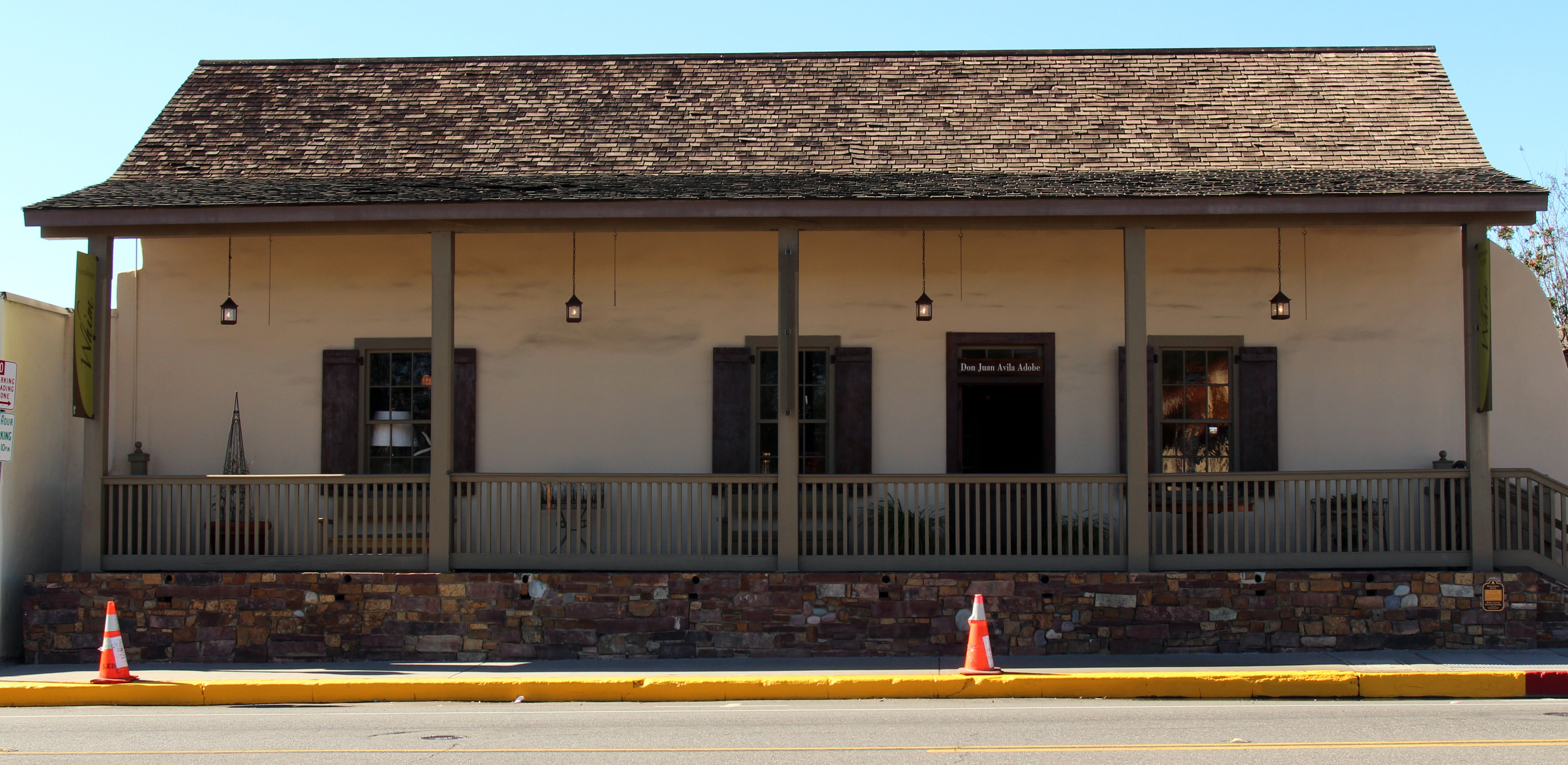
The historic Juan Ávila Adobe.

As of the 2020 census, San Juan Capistrano had a population of 35,196. The population density was 2,439.1 inhabitants per square mile (941.7/km^{2}).

The median age was 44.1 years. 21.4% of residents were under the age of 18 and 21.6% were 65 years of age or older. For every 100 females, there were 96.2 males, and for every 100 females age 18 and over, there were 93.4 males.

The census reported that 99.1% of the population lived in households, 0.5% lived in non-institutionalized group quarters, and 0.4% were institutionalized. 100.0% of residents lived in urban areas, while 0.0% lived in rural areas.

There were 11,849 households, of which 32.3% had children under the age of 18 living in them. Of all households, 59.1% were married-couple households, 4.8% were cohabiting couple households, 12.6% had a male householder with no spouse or partner present, and 23.5% had a female householder with no spouse or partner present. About 19.5% of households were made up of individuals, and 13.0% had someone living alone who was 65 years of age or older. The average household size was 2.94. There were 8,901 families (75.1% of all households).

There were 12,319 housing units at an average density of 853.7 units per square mile (329.6 units/km^{2}), of which 11,849 (96.2%) were occupied. Of the occupied units, 75.8% were owner-occupied and 24.2% were occupied by renters. The homeowner vacancy rate was 0.9%, and the rental vacancy rate was 4.0%.

=== 2023 ACS estimates ===
In 2023, the US Census Bureau estimated that the median household income was $127,893, and the per capita income was $60,670. About 4.8% of families and 7.3% of the population were below the poverty line.

=== 2010 census ===
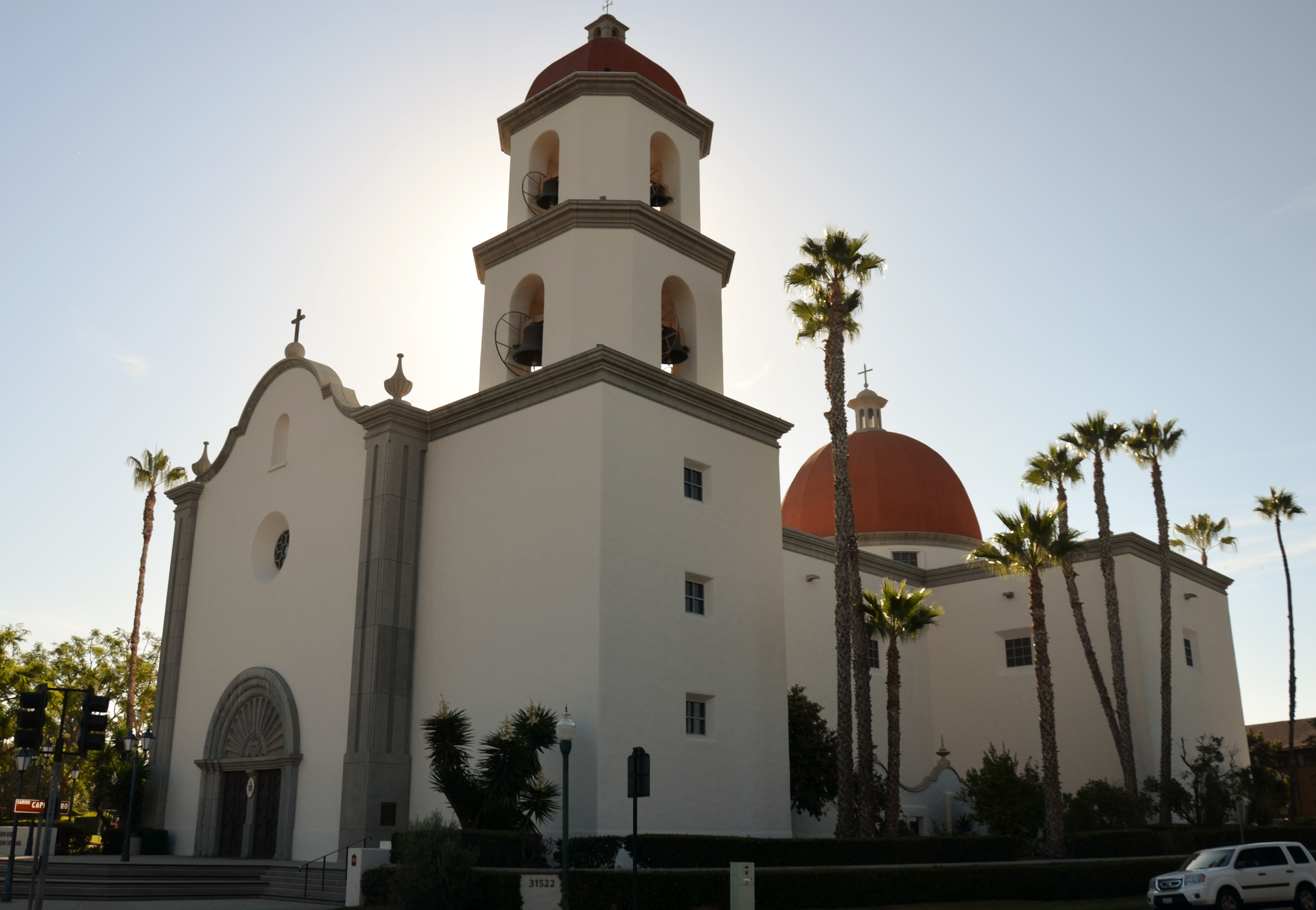
The 85-foot (26 m) tall Mission Basilica is the tallest building in San Juan. Pope John Paul II conferred it the rank of Basilica in 2000.

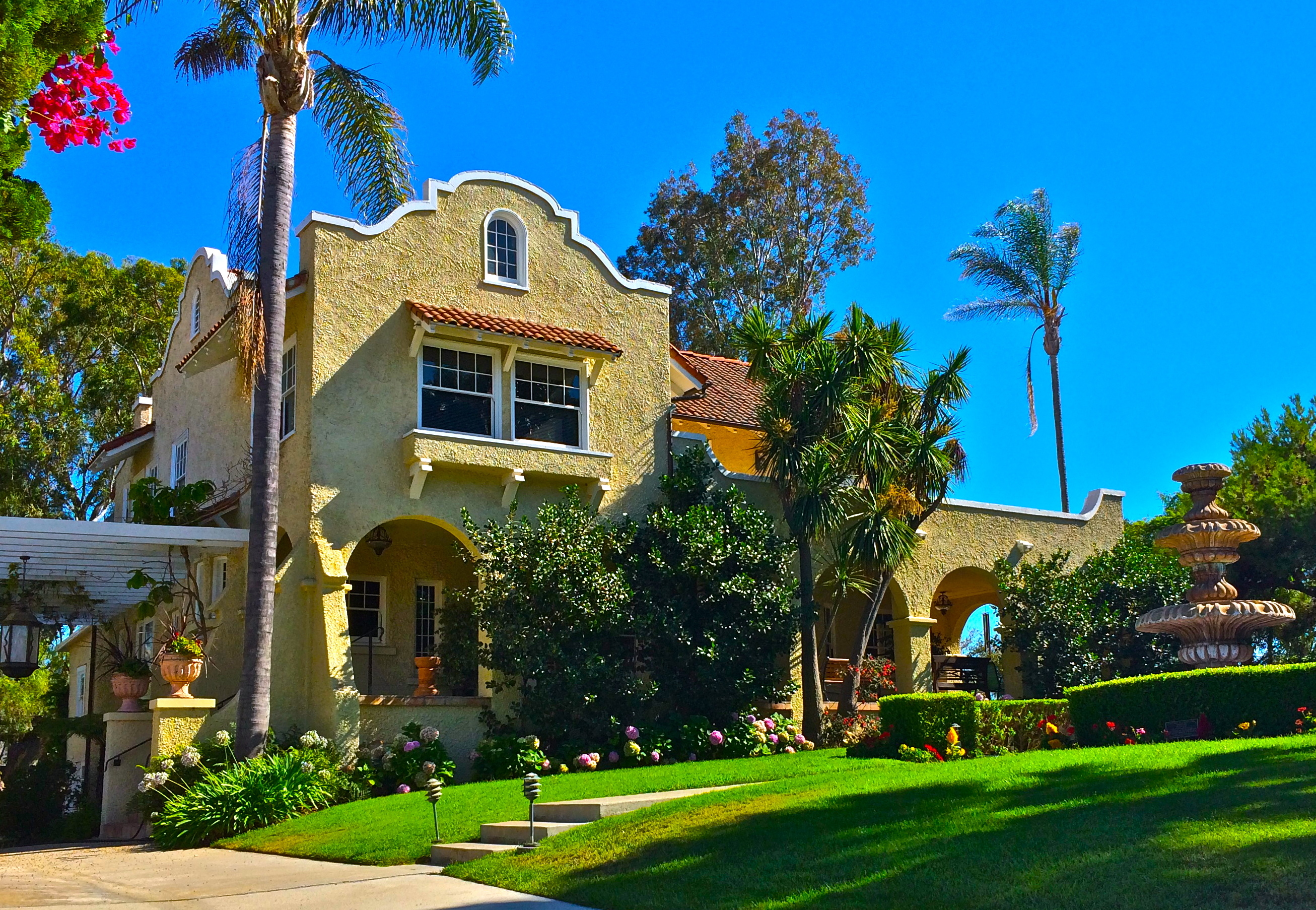
The historic Frank A. Forster House, a Mission Revival estate built by the grandson of Don Juan Forster.

At the 2010 Census San Juan Capistrano had a population of 34,593. The population density was 2,419.9 inhabitants per square mile (934.3/km^{2}). The racial makeup of San Juan Capistrano was 26,664 (77.1%) White (55.8% Non-Hispanic White), 193 (0.6%) African American, 286 (0.8%) Native American, 975 (2.8%) Asian, 33 (0.1%) Pacific Islander, 5,234 (15.1%) from other races, and 1,208 (3.5%) from two or more races. Hispanic or Latino of any race were 13,388 persons (38.7%).

The census reported that 34,506 people (99.7% of the population) lived in households, and 87 (0.3%) lived in non-institutionalized group quarters.

There were 11,394 households, 4,030 (35.4%) had children under the age of 18 living in them, 6,706 (58.9%) were opposite-sex married couples living together, 1,089 (9.6%) had a female householder with no husband present, 526 (4.6%) had a male householder with no wife present. There were 456 (4.0%) unmarried opposite-sex partnerships, and 87 (0.8%) same-sex married couples or partnerships. 2,381 households (20.9%) were one person and 1,407 (12.3%) had someone living alone who was 65 or older. The average household size was 3.03. There were 8,321 families (73.0% of households); the average family size was 3.44.

The age distribution was 8,518 people (24.6%) under the age of 18, 3,066 people (8.9%) aged 18 to 24, 7,804 people (22.6%) aged 25 to 44, 9,792 people (28.3%) aged 45 to 64, and 5,413 people (15.6%) who were 65 or older. The median age was 40.2 years. For every 100 females, there were 98.3 males. For every 100 females age 18 and over, there were 96.7 males.

There were 11,940 housing units at an average density of 835.2 per square mile, of the occupied units 8,462 (74.3%) were owner-occupied and 2,932 (25.7%) were rented. The homeowner vacancy rate was 1.3%; the rental vacancy rate was 4.7%. 24,052 people (69.5% of the population) lived in owner-occupied housing units and 10,454 people (30.2%) lived in rental housing units.

According to the 2010 Census, San Juan Capistrano had a median household income of $75,356, with 12.7% of the population living below the federal poverty line.

== Economy ==
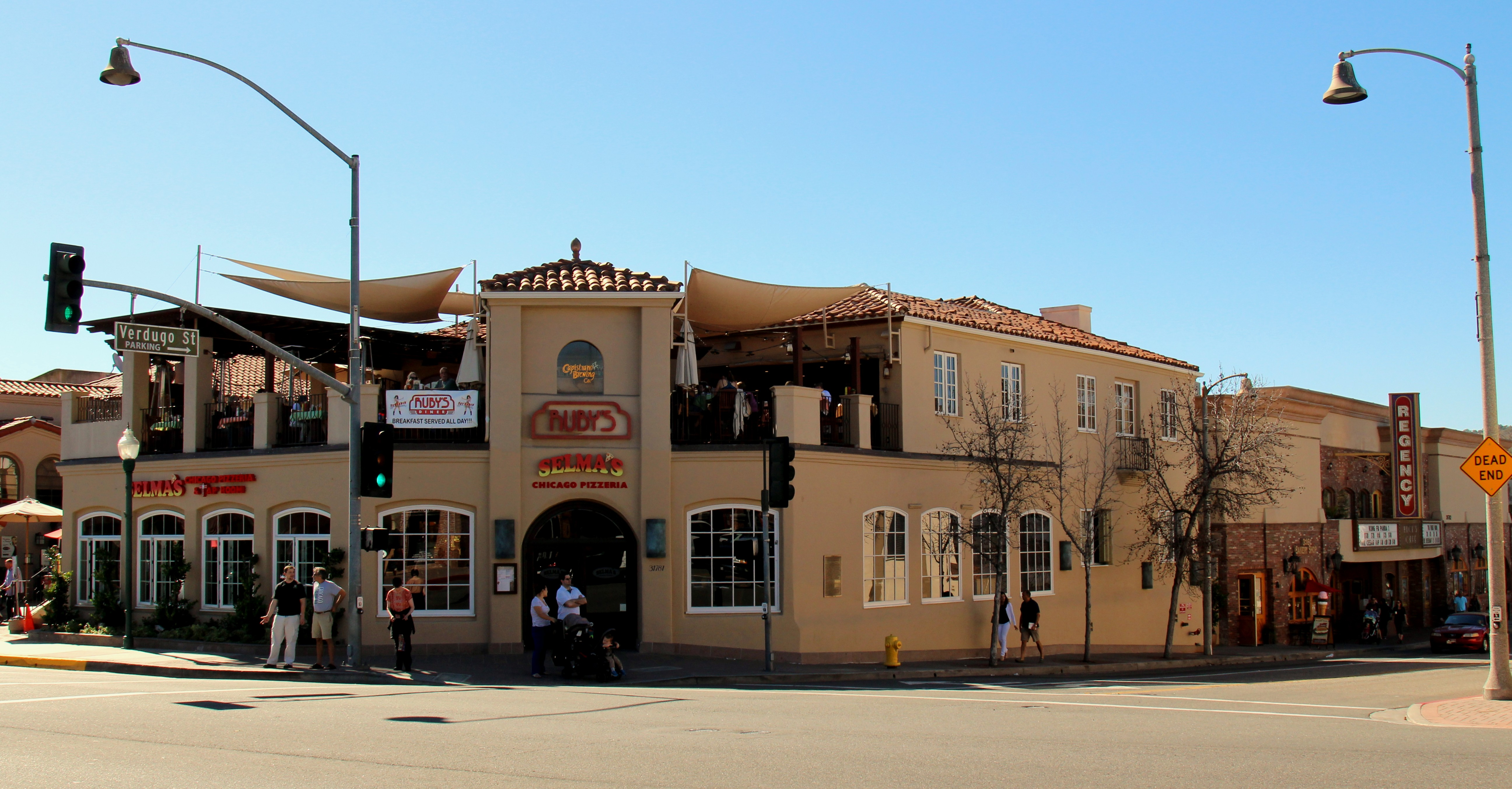
Shops in downtown San Juan.

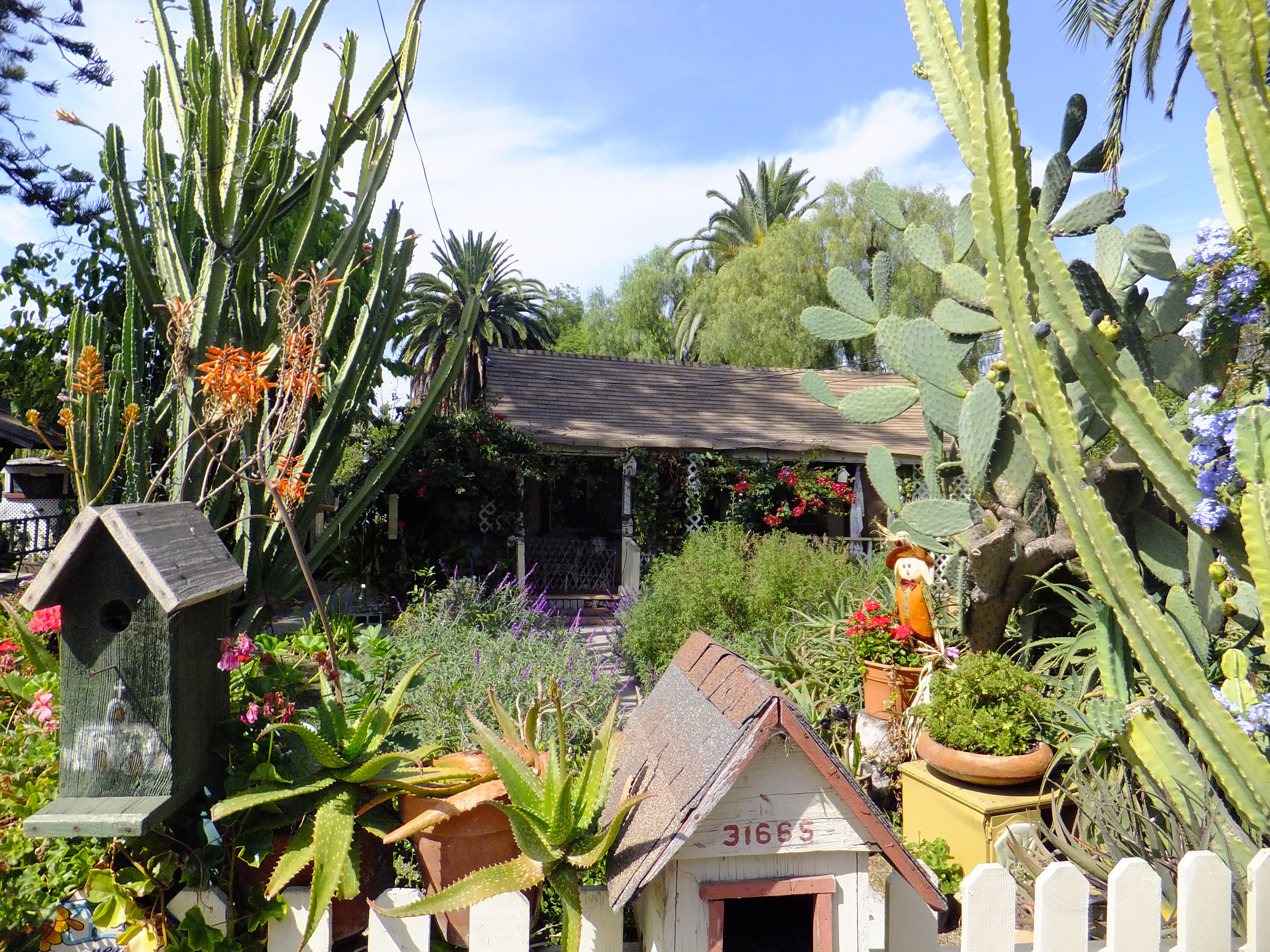
Los Rios Historic District is a National Register Historic District.

San Juan Capistrano is home to approximately 2,000 businesses. The city's unemployment rate was at 3.2% as of December 2025.

=== Top employers ===
According to the city's Comprehensive Annual Financial Report from June 30, 2025, the largest employers in the city are:

#	Employer	# of employees
1	Capistrano Unified School District	3,992
2	St. Margaret's Episcopal School	429
3	Costco	340
4	Ensign Services	185
5	JSerra Catholic High School	145
6	Fluidmaster Inc. HQ	130
7	ASRV, LLC	124
8	Inn at the Mission San Juan Capistrano	118
9	Marbella Country Club	106
10	Capistrano Connections Academy	100

== Arts and culture ==
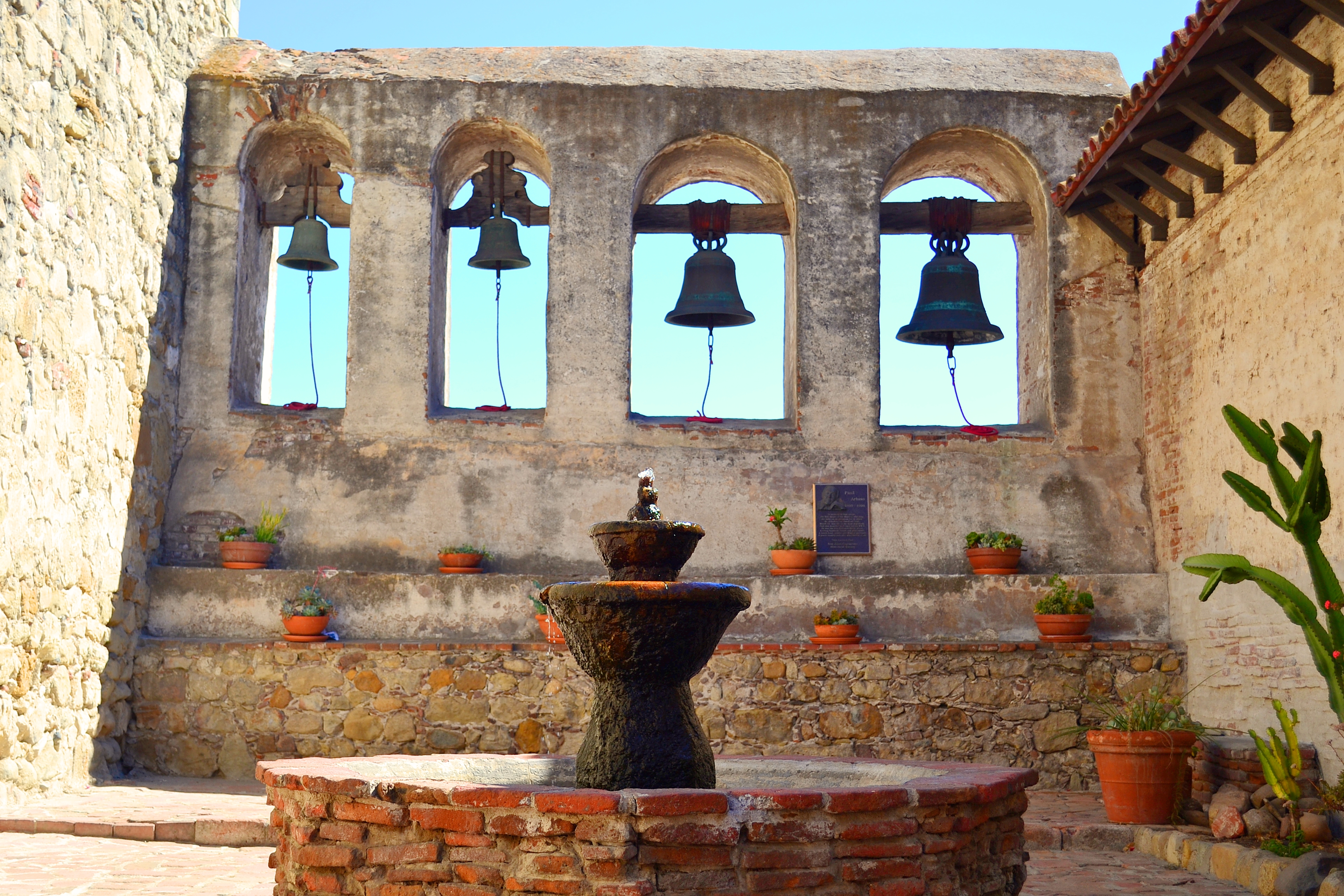
Cliff swallows make their home at Mission San Juan Capistrano during their yearly migration from Argentina.

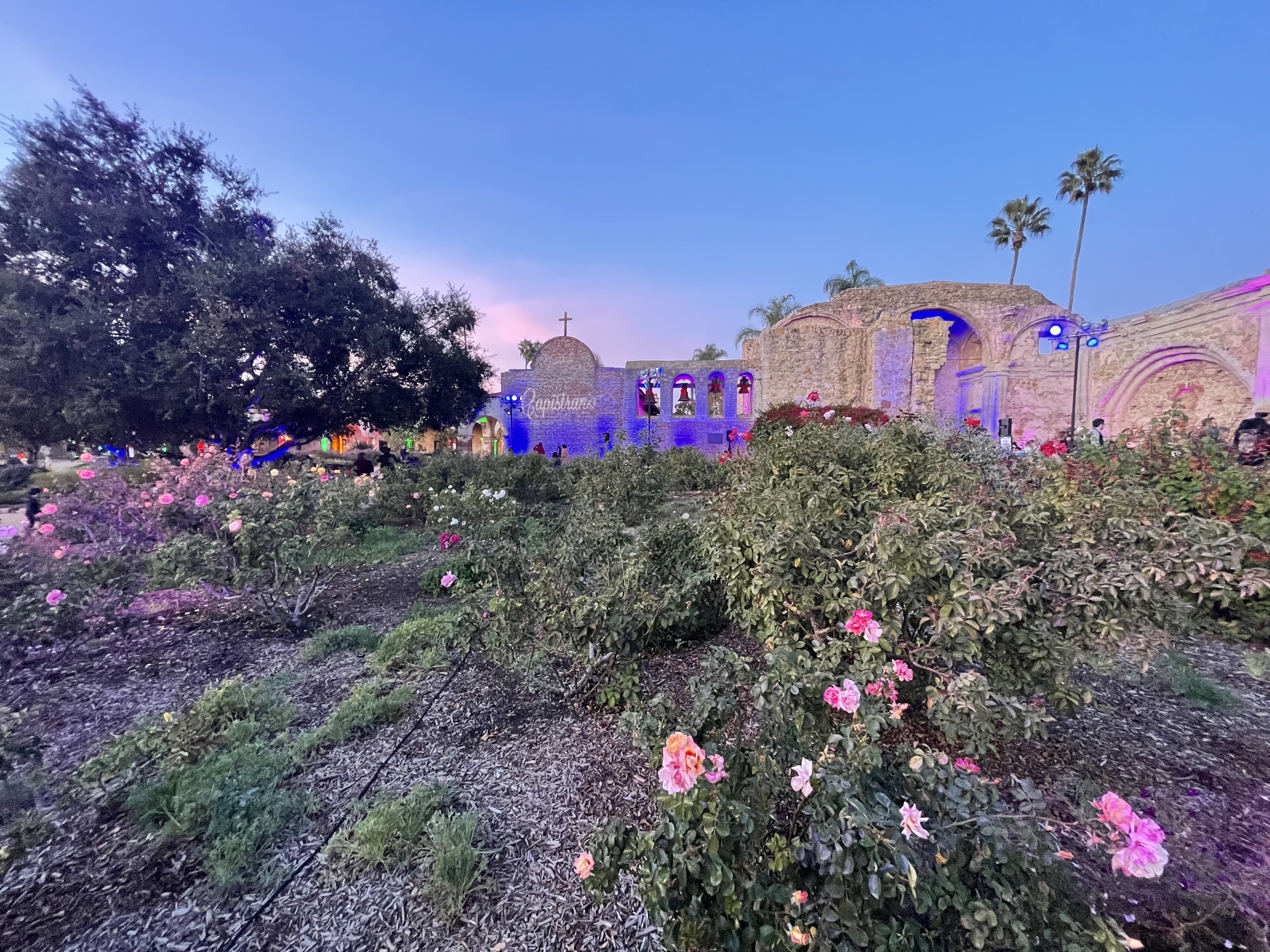
Community Christmas festival at Mission San Juan Capistrano, Dec 2023

San Juan Capistrano is also known for its cliff swallows. The protected birds return during migration, which originates in the town of Goya, Argentina, around Saint Joseph's Day (March 19) each year. The day is celebrated by the city's annual Swallows' Day Parade and other festive events. The swallows leave around October 23, the former feast day of Saint John of Capistrano. The 1940 hit song "When the Swallows Come Back to Capistrano", written by Leon René, is a love song inspired by this annual event. Another birdwatching place is the Arroyo Bird House Park, containing many colorful birdhouses.

The Serra Chapel at the mission is the oldest in-use building in California. San Juan was also the site of one of the first places to produce Californian wine.

Putuidem Village, a 1.5-acre park (0.61 ha), is part of the original lands of the Acjachemen (Juaneño). Completed in 2021, it commemorates the history of the Acjachemen by the Spanish colonizers.

== Registered Historic Places ==
- Carl Stroschein House
- Casa de Esperanza
- Domingo Adobe and Casa Manuel Garcia
- Esslinger Building
- Frank A Forster House
- Harrison House
- Joel R Congdon House
- Los Rios Street Historic District
- Miguel Parra Adobe- San Juan
- Mission San Juan Capistrano
- Montanes Adobe
- Richard Egan House
- Roger Y Williams House

== Government ==
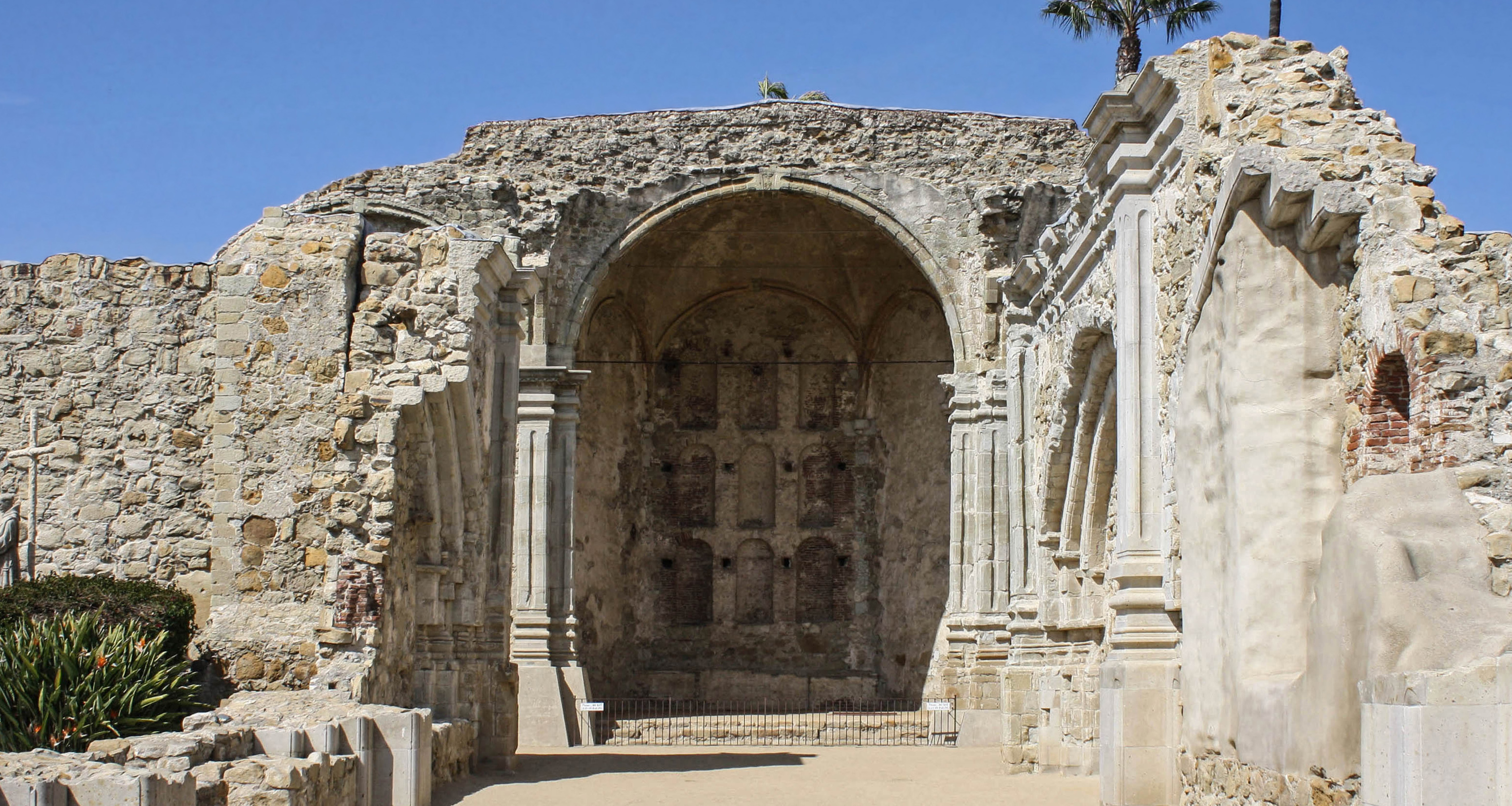
Ruins of the Great Stone Church

As of December 2025, the City Council members are John Campbell (Mayor), John Taylor (Mayor Pro Tem), Troy A. Bourne, Sergio Farias, and Howard Hart.

The current city manager is Benjamin Siegel.

In the California State Legislature, San Juan Capistrano is in the 38th senatorial district, represented by Democrat Catherine Blakespear, and in the 74th Assembly district, represented by Republican Laurie Davies.

In the United States House of Representatives, San Juan Capistrano is in California's 49th congressional district, represented by Democrat Mike Levin.

Additionally, in the Orange County Board of Supervisors, San Juan Capistrano is in the fifth district, represented by Katrina Foley since 2023.

=== Crime ===
The Uniform Crime Report (UCR), collected annually by the FBI, compiles police statistics from local and state law enforcement agencies across the nation. The UCR records Part I and Part II crimes. Part I crimes become known to law enforcement and are considered the most serious crimes including homicide, rape, robbery, aggravated assault, burglary, larceny, motor vehicle theft, and arson. Part II crimes only include arrest data. The 2023 UCR Data for San Juan Capistrano is listed below:

2025 UCR Data
	Aggravated Assault	Homicide	Rape	Robbery	Burglary	Larceny Theft	Motor Vehicle Theft	Arson	All Other Larceny
San Juan Capistrano	48	1	5	5	44	168	39	1	45

== Education ==
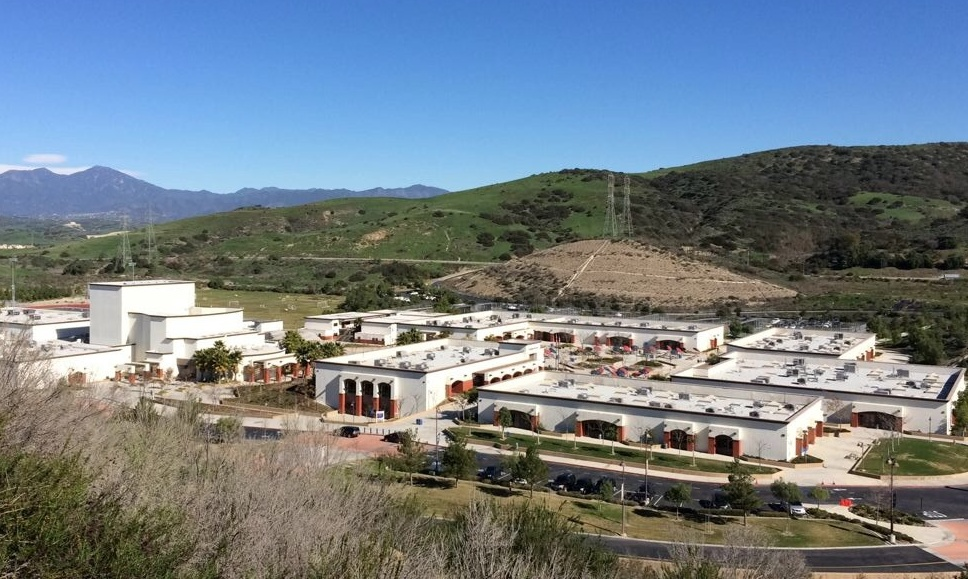
San Juan Hills High School

San Juan Capistrano is served by the Capistrano Unified School District. In the 2007–08 academic year, San Juan Hills High School opened with about 600 freshman students. It is the city's only public high school, although a sizable portion of San Juan Capistrano's residents attend high schools in neighboring cities since many of those schools are also part of the Capistrano Unified School District.

San Juan has four public elementary schools (grades K–5): Del Obispo Elementary School, Harold Ambuehl Elementary School, Kinoshita Elementary School, and San Juan Elementary School. The local public middle school (grades 6–8) is Marco Forster Middle School. Capistrano Valley High School (grades 9–12) lies just outside of the city's borders, but serves many of the city's students. A public continuation high school, Junipero Serra High School, also serves the area.

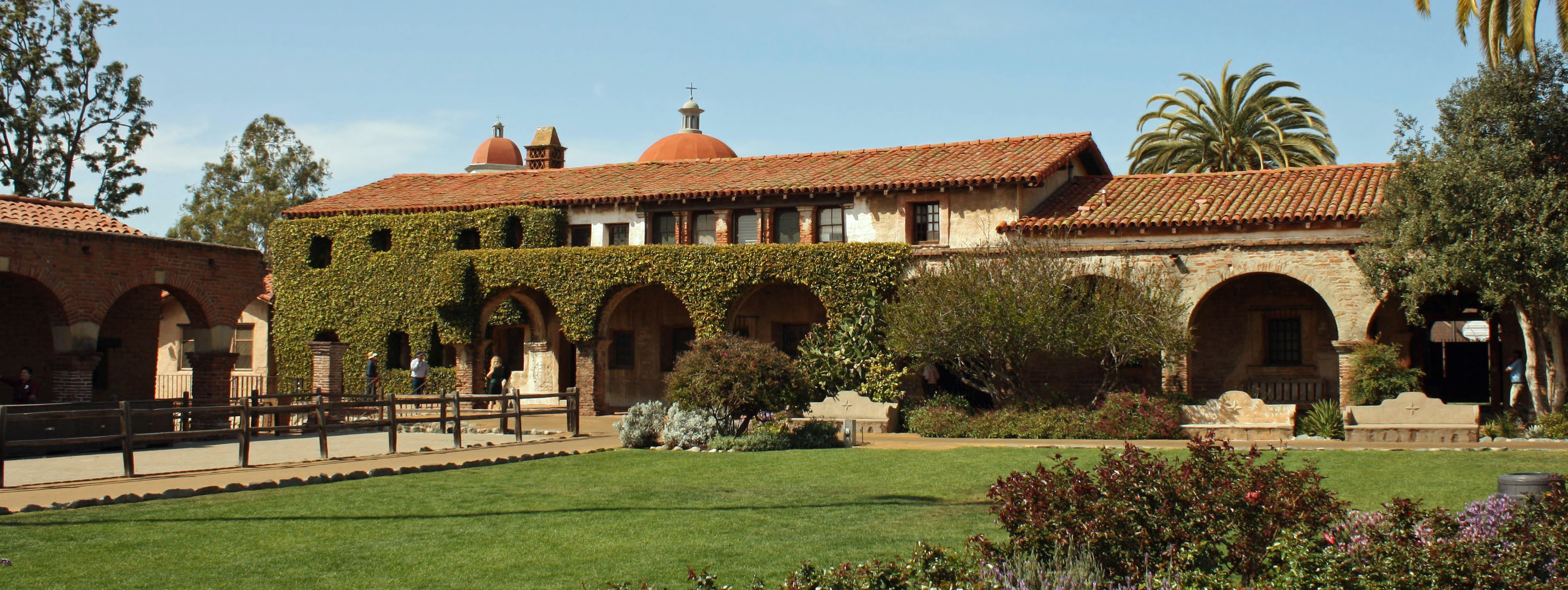
View of the north wing of the mission from the central patio.

San Juan also has six private, non-secular schools. Capistrano Valley Christian Schools (grades pre-K – 12), Saddleback Valley Christian School (grades pre-K – 12), St. Margaret's Episcopal School (grades pre-K – 12), and JSerra Catholic High School (grades 9–12). Mission Basilica School (grades K–8) is located on the historic Mission grounds, utilizes some of the historic buildings as classrooms, and is part of Mission Basilica San Juan Capistrano. The other is Rancho Capistrano Christian School (grades K–8), located off Interstate 5 on Saddleback Church's south campus.

San Juan also has a private, secular school, Fairmont School (grade K - 12), located close to San Juan Capistrano Mission.

== Media ==
San Juan Capistrano is served by two newspapers, the Capistrano Valley News (owned by the Orange County Register) and The Capistrano Dispatch. The Capistrano Valley News runs once weekly on Thursdays and The Dispatch runs on the second and fourth Fridays of each month.

The San Juan Capistrano Patch, an online-only news website, also serves the city.

== Transportation ==
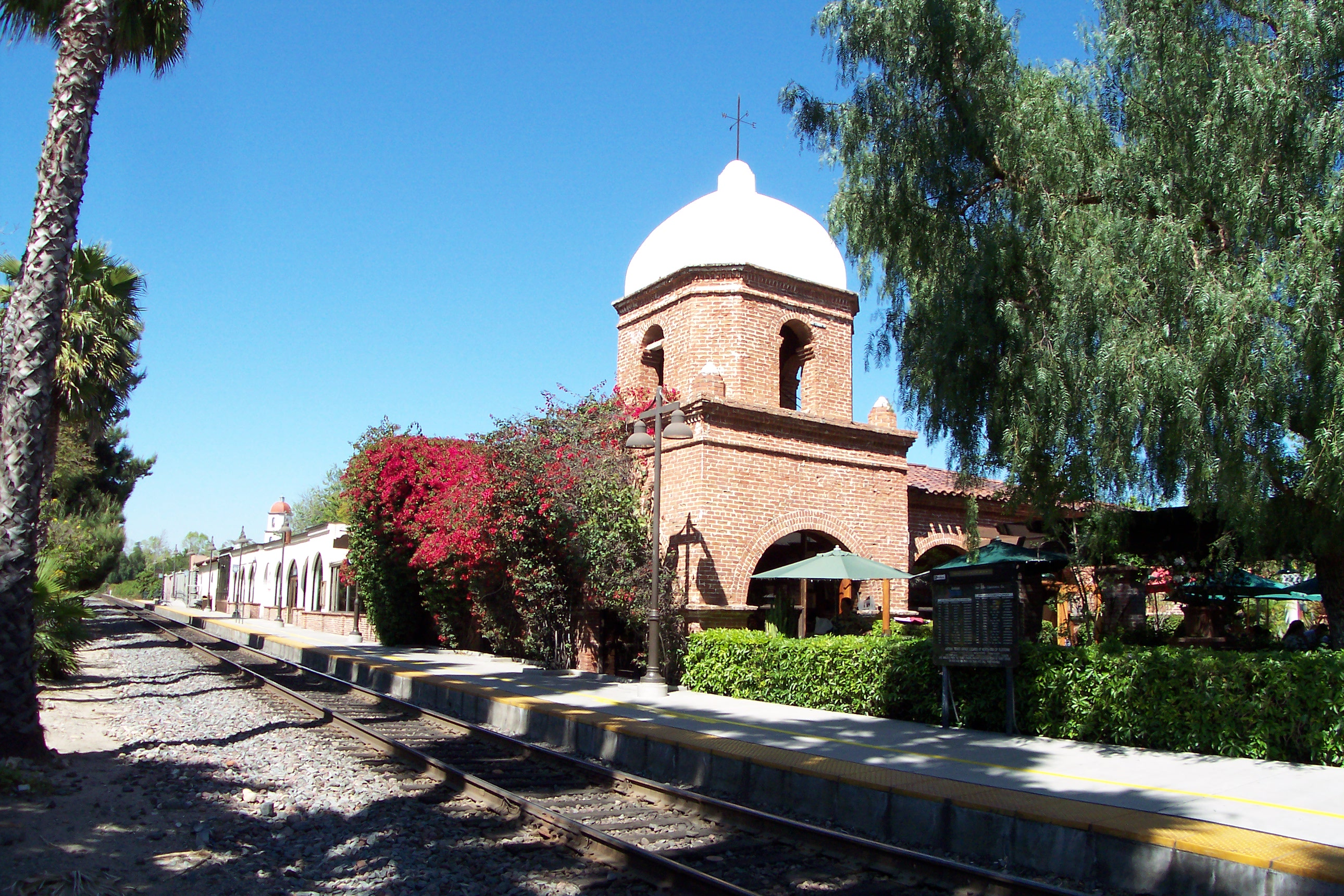
San Juan Capistrano station is served by Amtrak and Metrolink.

The Orange County Transportation Authority (OCTA) operates bus routes within the city, connecting it to other parts of Orange County. 1 bus route runs through the city crossing 35 different bus stops: Route 91 via Paseo de Valencia/Camino Capistrano/Del Obispo Street.

=== Rail ===
The San Juan Capistrano station is served by Amtrak and Metrolink. The station is located one block away from the historic San Juan Capistrano Mission next to Los Rios Street in downtown San Juan Capistrano. Its proximity to the city's tourist attractions makes it a popular stop during the summer months.

=== Highways ===
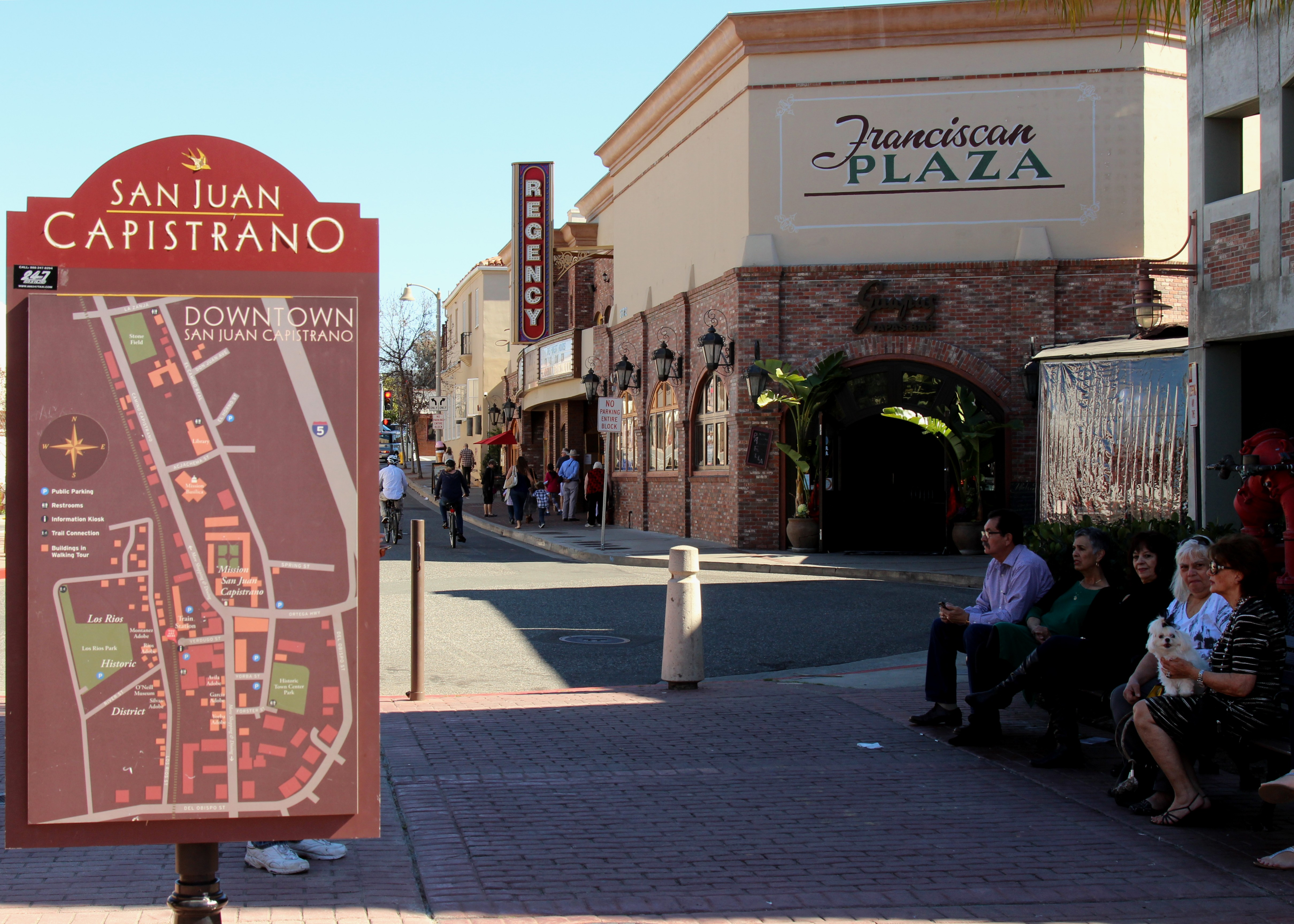
Shops in downtown San Juan.

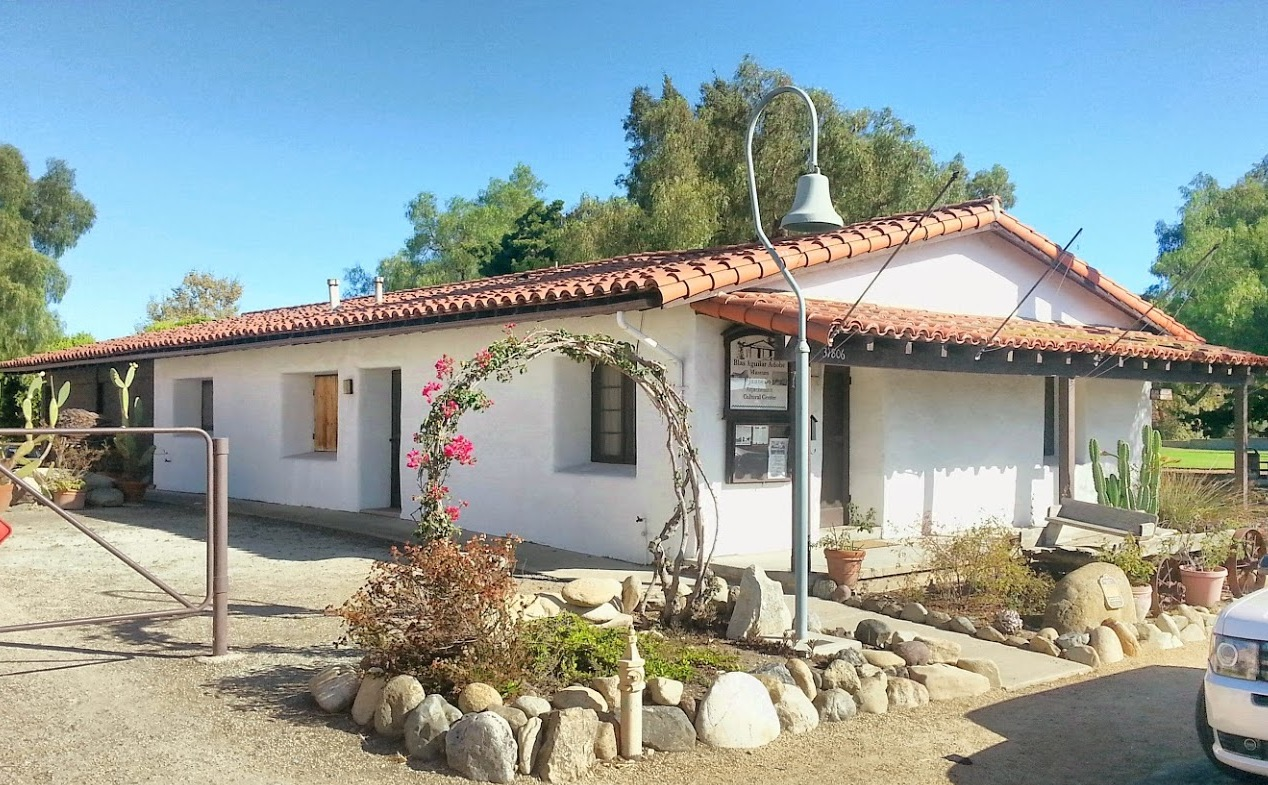
The Casa de Esperanza is on the National Register of Historic Places.

I-5 (San Diego Freeway) has three interchanges completely located in the city (at Camino Capistrano, SR 74/Ortega Highway, and Junipero Serra Road), two interchanges partially located within the city (at SR 1/Camino las Ramblas (which is partially within Dana Point) as well as SR 73 (which is partially within Mission Viejo), and an additional northbound entrance ramp from Stonehill Drive and Camino Capistrano.

Pacific Coast Highway is one of the most notable state routes in California. It is often incorrectly referenced that SR 1 terminates in nearby Dana Point because the city borders the Pacific Ocean (unlike San Juan Capistrano). In reality, SR 1 terminates shortly after it junctions with Interstate 5, crossing within San Juan Capistrano city limits (although this is a few hundred feet away from the city limits of Dana Point). There is an official SR 1 terminus sign on a traffic light pole along the southbound lanes on SR 1 shortly after crossing under I-5 which is within San Juan Capistrano city limits.

SR 73 (San Joaquin Hills Toll Road) has its southern terminus at I-5 in San Juan Capistrano. There are no exits along SR 73 in San Juan Capistrano other than its junction with Interstate 5.

SR 74 has its official western terminus at Interstate 5 in San Juan Capistrano. The city-maintained road that continues west as Ortega Highway originally terminated at Camino Capistrano in front of Mission San Juan Capistrano; however, interchange reconstruction that was completed in 2015 brought Ortega Highway to continue onto Del Obispo Street towards Dana Point, with a right turn required to stay on the older portion of Ortega Highway.

The original route of US 101 ran through Downtown San Juan Capistrano on what is now Camino Capistrano. It was decommissioned when I-5 was completed in the 1950s.

== Water Services ==
Water in San Juan Capistrano is provided by the Santa Margarita Water District. The district sources its water primarily from the Metropolitan Water District of Southern California, which imports water from the Colorado River and the State Water Project, drawing from the Sacramento-San Joaquin River Delta. Additionally, water is supplied through the Irvine Ranch Water District's Baker Water Treatment Plant, which treats water from both the Metropolitan Water District of Southern California and the Santiago Reservoir.

== Sister cities ==
- Capestrano, Italy
- Ensenada, Mexico
- Petra, Spain
- Goya, Argentina

== Notable people ==
- Modesta Ávila (1867–1891), Californio ranchera and protester
- Anthony Cumia, radio host and podcaster
- Austin Hedges, MLB catcher
- Kyle Hendricks, MLB pitcher
- Mike Levin, U.S. representative
- Billy May, Arranger, Orchestrator, trumpet player
- Norm Sherry (1931–2021), catcher, manager, and coach in Major League Baseball
