= Mission Basilica San Juan Capistrano =

Catholic parish in San Juan Capistrano, California

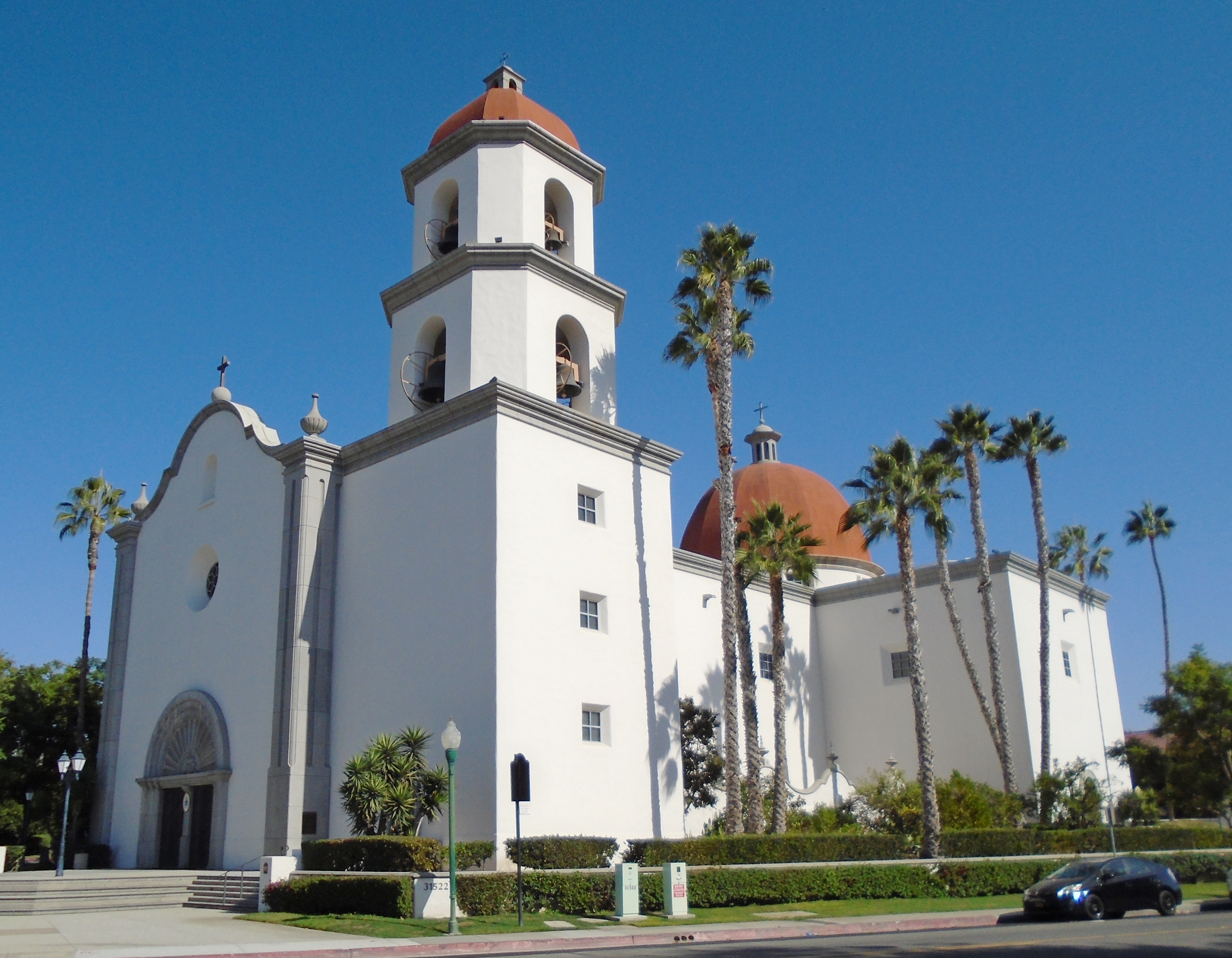
- (2019)

Religion
- Affiliation: Roman Catholic Church
- Ecclesiastical or organizational status: Minor basilica National shrine
- Leadership: Rev. Msgr. J. Michael McKiernen, Pastor Rev. Msgr. Arthur Holquin, Pastor Emeritus
- Year consecrated: 1987

Location
- Location: 31522 Camino Capistrano, San Juan Capistrano, California
- Interactive map of Mission Basilica San Juan Capistrano
- Territory: Diocese of Orange
- Coordinates: 33°30′15″N 117°39′48″W

Architecture
- Architect: John Bartlett
- Style: Mission Revival
- Groundbreaking: 1984
- Completed: 1986

Specifications
- Dome: 1
- Dome height (outer): 85 feet (26 m)
- Spire: 1
- Spire height: 104 feet (32 m)

Website
- www.missionparish.org

Mission Basilica San Juan Capistrano is a Catholic parish in the Diocese of Orange. The parish church is located just northwest of Mission San Juan Capistrano in the city of San Juan Capistrano, California, United States. Completed in 1986, it was designated a minor basilica in 2000 and a national shrine in 2003.

The parish sponsors a number of ministries, notably "Serra's Pantry", a registered food agency distributing food and hygiene supplies to several hundred local families, and the Mission Basilica School, a parochial school for children in grades pre-K through 8.

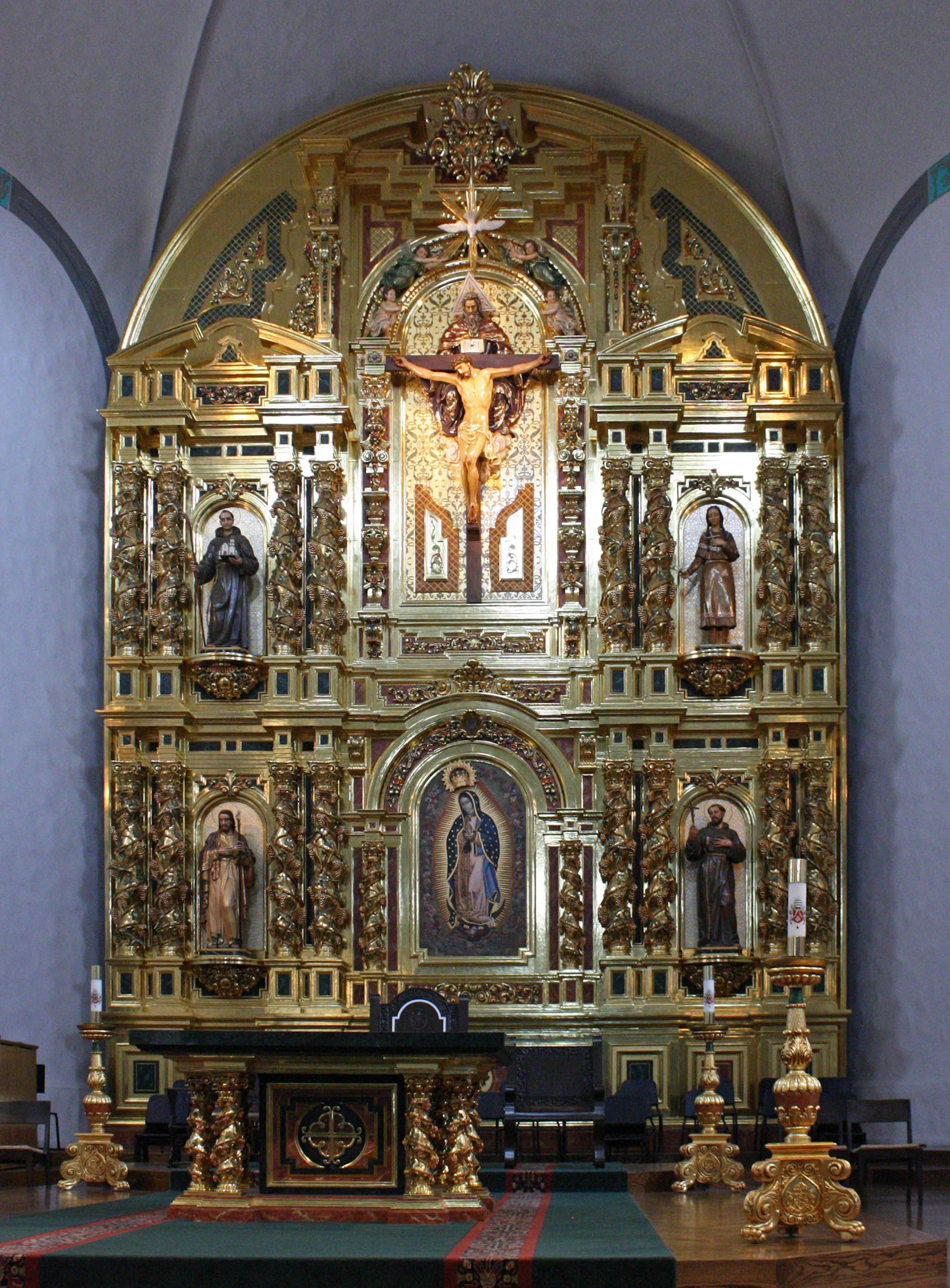
The "Grand Retablo" with the Trinity at top center, St. Junípero Serra top left, St. Kateri Tekakwitha top right, St. Francis bottom right, St. Joseph bottom left and Our Lady of Guadalupe bottom center

== History ==
St. John O'Sullivan was placed in charge of the mission in 1910, at which time its community was scattered and its buildings in ruins. He set about rebuilding the parish community as well as restoring the old facilities. The Mission was accorded full parochial status in 1918 as the Mission Church San Juan Capistrano. The Serra Chapel, the oldest standing church building in California and the only extant building where St. Junipero Serra is known to have said Mass, was used for services, as the Mission's original stone church was destroyed in an 1812 earthquake.

Various efforts had been made to restore the church over the years, but had only caused further damage. O'Sullivan, who would serve as pastor until his death in 1933, had thought to construct a new parish church modeled on the old stone church, but never realized his idea. The modern case for a new parish church was taken up by Fr. Paul Martin, who was named pastor in 1976. By this time, the area Catholic population had grown considerably, and the Serra Chapel was inadequate to the needs of the parish.

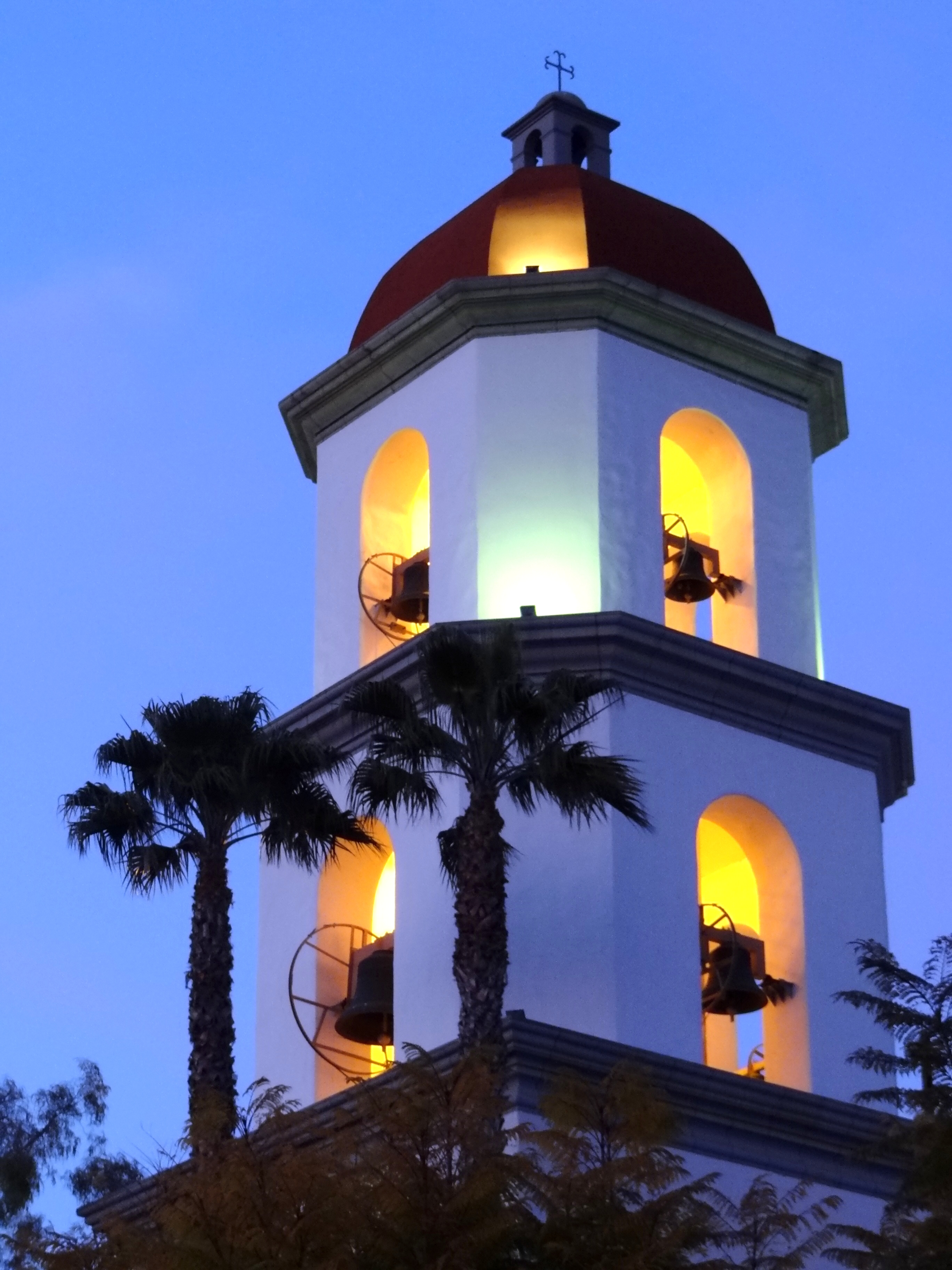
The bell tower at dusk

Fundraising had begun by 1981, encompassing pledge drives and donations from mission visitors. The first Mass in the new building was offered on Christmas 1984, but construction would not be completed for another two years. The first Mass in the new church was celebrated on October 23, 1986, and the building was officially dedicated by Timothy Cardinal Manning on February 8, 1987.

== Design ==
The church is patterned after the Mission's 1806 stone church, but is not a replica of it. It was designed by architect John Bartlett and built by Joseph Byron, Jr. of Alex Sutherland Construction. The interior was designed by historian Norman Neuerberg, who painted much of the decorative and sacred art which adorns the walls.

A prominent feature of the basilica is the Grand retablo, a 42-foot-high (13 m), 30-foot-wide (9.1 m), 16-ton altar-backing carved in cedar and covered in gold leaf which is stylistically reminiscent of 17th- and 18th-century Spanish colonial and Mexican colonial retablos. The retablo's focal point is the Trinity, composed of the crucifix, God the Father depicted as an ancient patriarch, and the Holy Spirit depicted as a dove. Beneath the Trinity is Our Lady of Guadalupe. Four saints included on the retablo are Saint Francis of Assisi — patron of the mission's founding order, Saint Joseph, Saint Junípero Serra — the Mission's founder, and Saint Kateri Tekakwitha — significant for the area's Native American population. The Retablo was designed and created by 84 artisans in numerous parts at the Talleres de Arte Granda in Madrid, Spain.
