= Los Rios Historic District =

Neighborhood in California, United States

- U.S. National Register of Historic Places
- U.S. Historic district
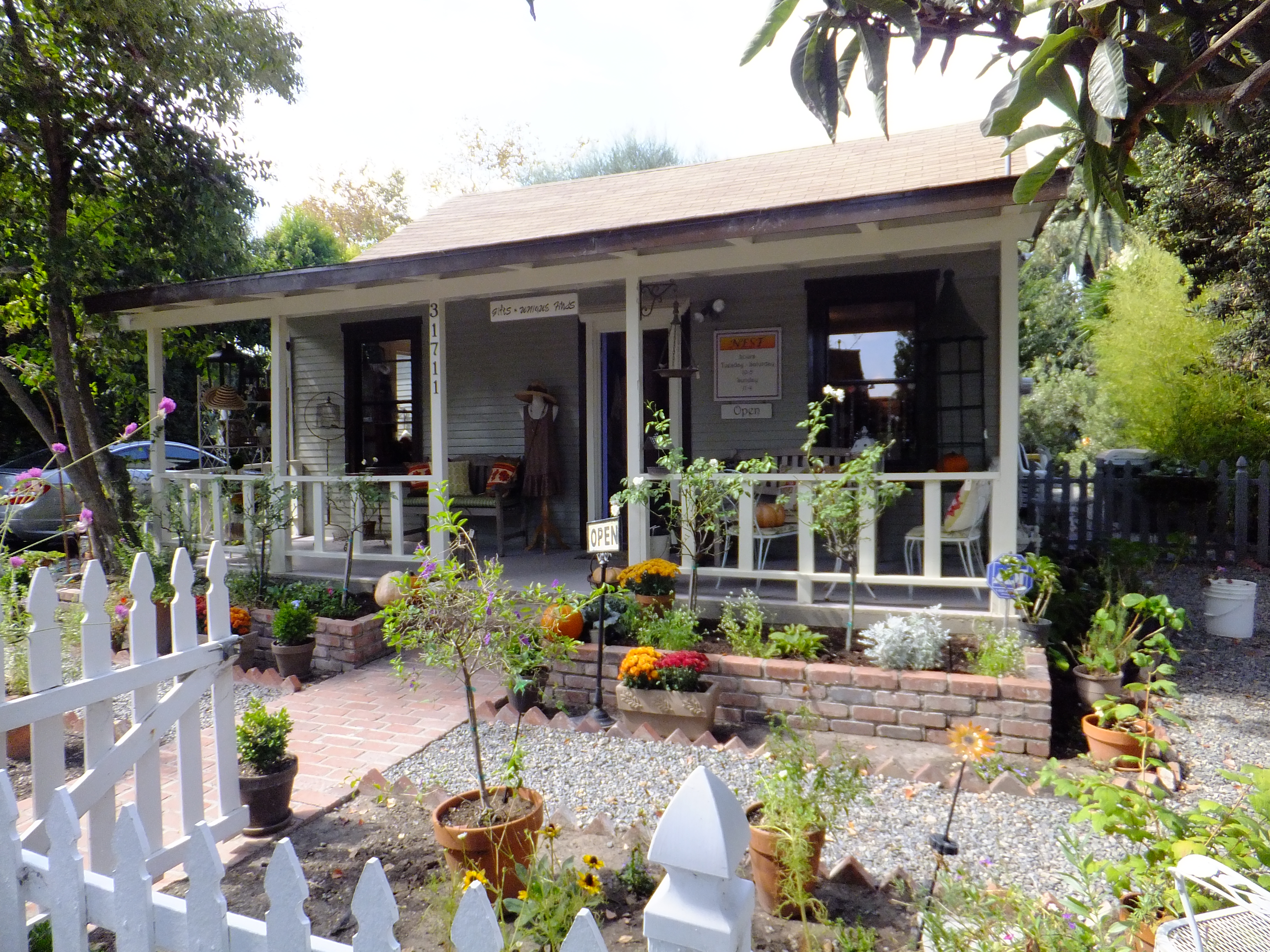
- 31711 Los Rios Street

- Location within California Location within the United States
- Location: 31600–31921 Los Rios St., San Juan Capistrano, California
- Coordinates: 33°30′6″N 117°39′49″W
- Area: 6.2 acres (2.5 ha)
- Architectural style: Late 19th and 20th Century Revivals
- NRHP reference No.: 83001216
- Added to NRHP: April 4, 1983

The Los Rios Historic District is an historic district and neighborhood in the city of San Juan Capistrano, California. The nearby Mission San Juan Capistrano was the first of the 21 California Missions to have Native Americans, soldiers and workers live outside the mission grounds, making it the oldest residential neighborhood in California. Three adobe structures remain in the Los Rios neighborhood itself, although there are a number of others close by which were part of what was once a larger neighborhood.

The neighborhood originally had 40 adobe structures, but most were replaced in the 19th century by wooden board and batten structures. Thirty-one of the buildings on Los Rios Street and the surrounding area are listed on the National Register of Historic Places as of 1983.

== See also ==
- Mission San Juan Capistrano
- El Adobe de Capistrano
- San Juan Capistrano Depot

== Gallery ==
Los Rios Street

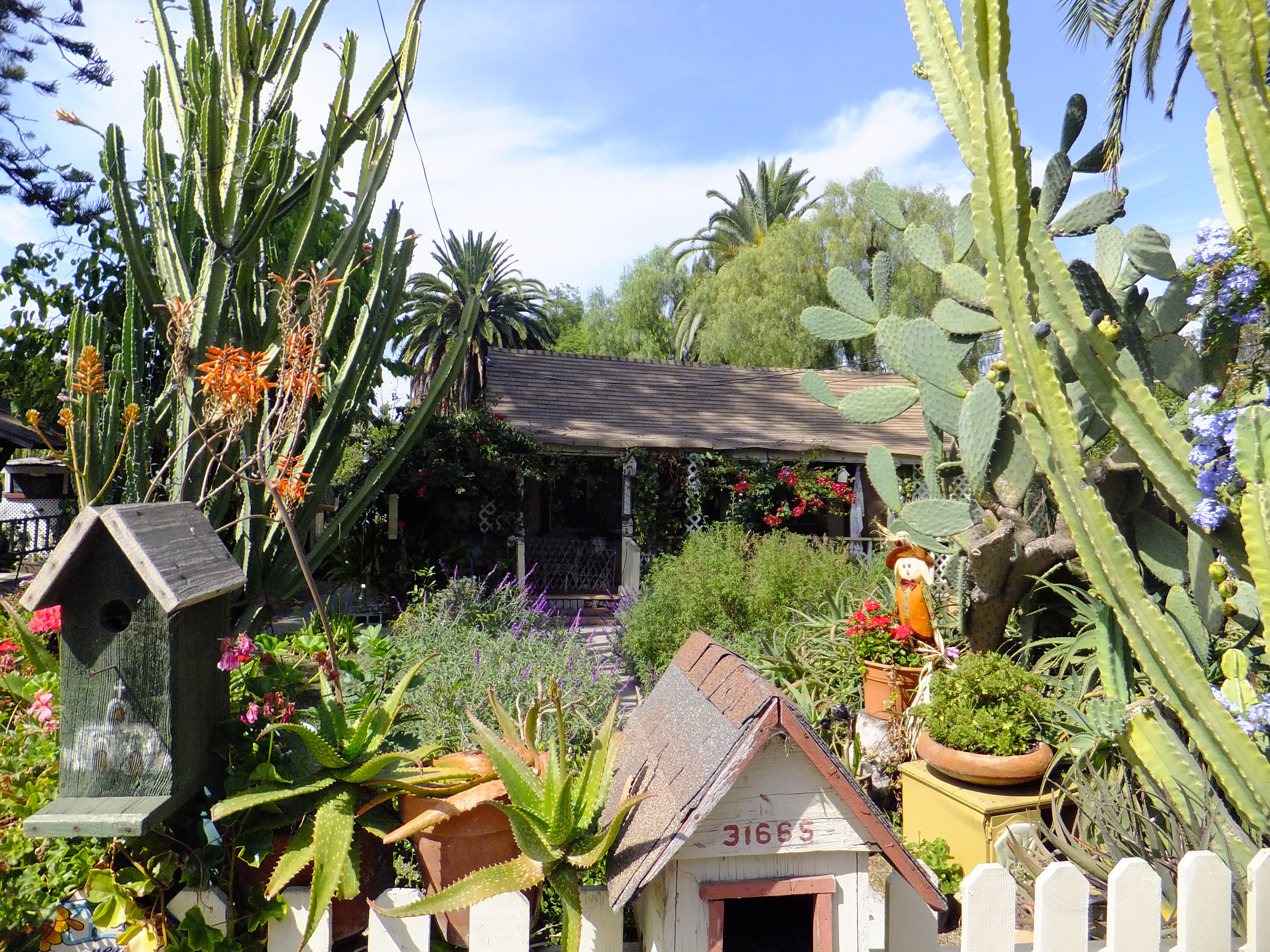
No. 31655

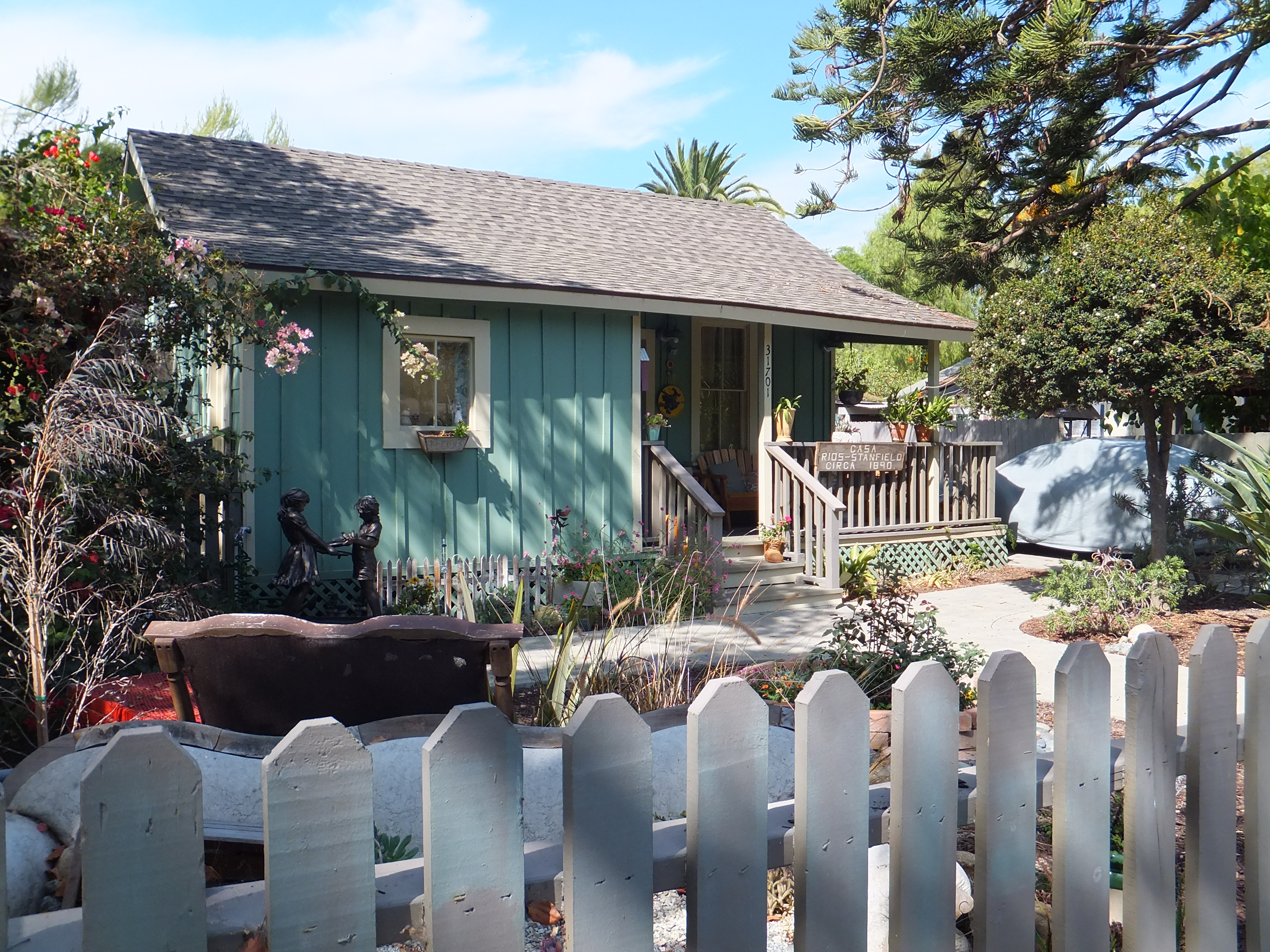
No. 31701

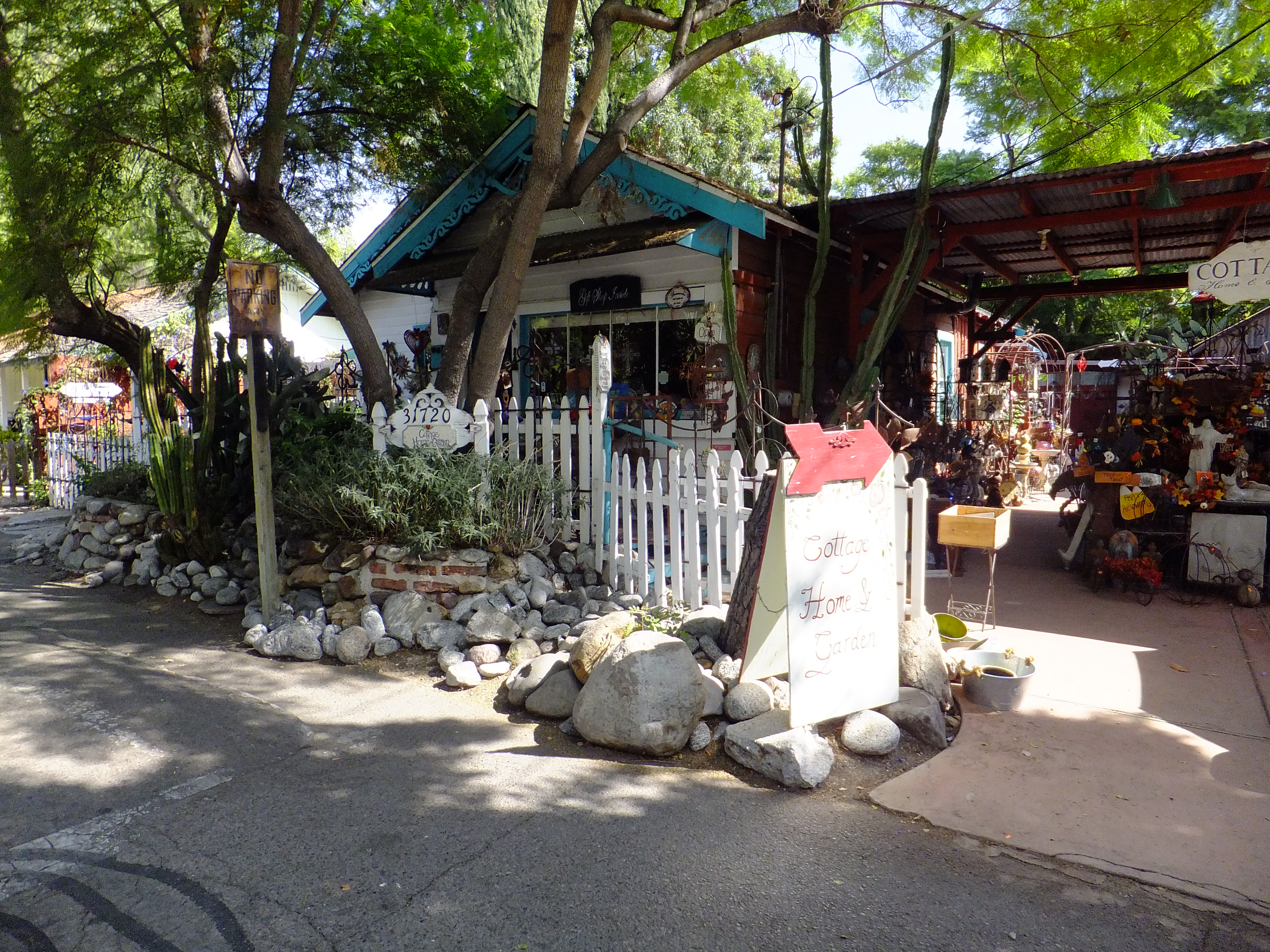
No. 31720

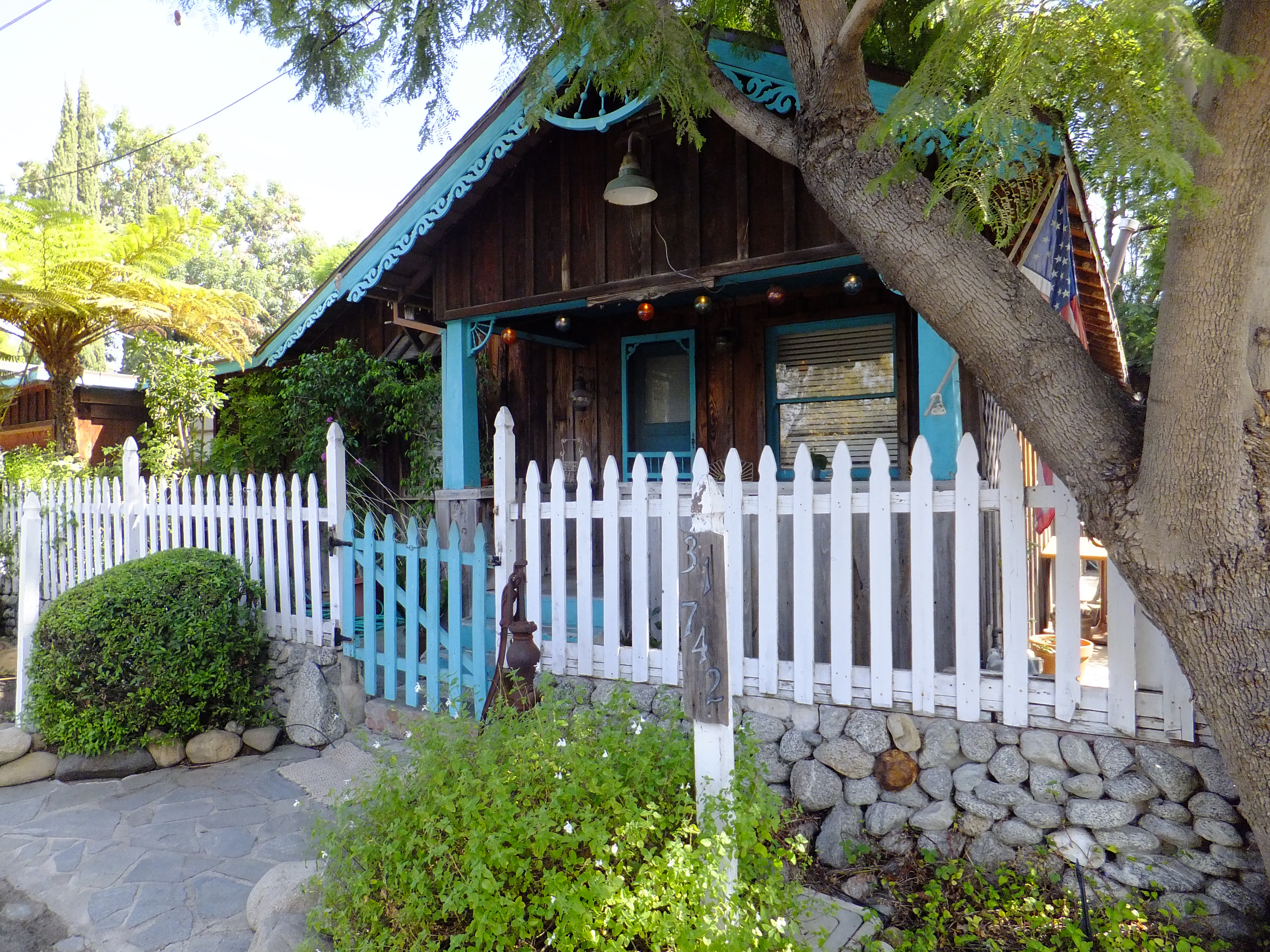
No. 31742

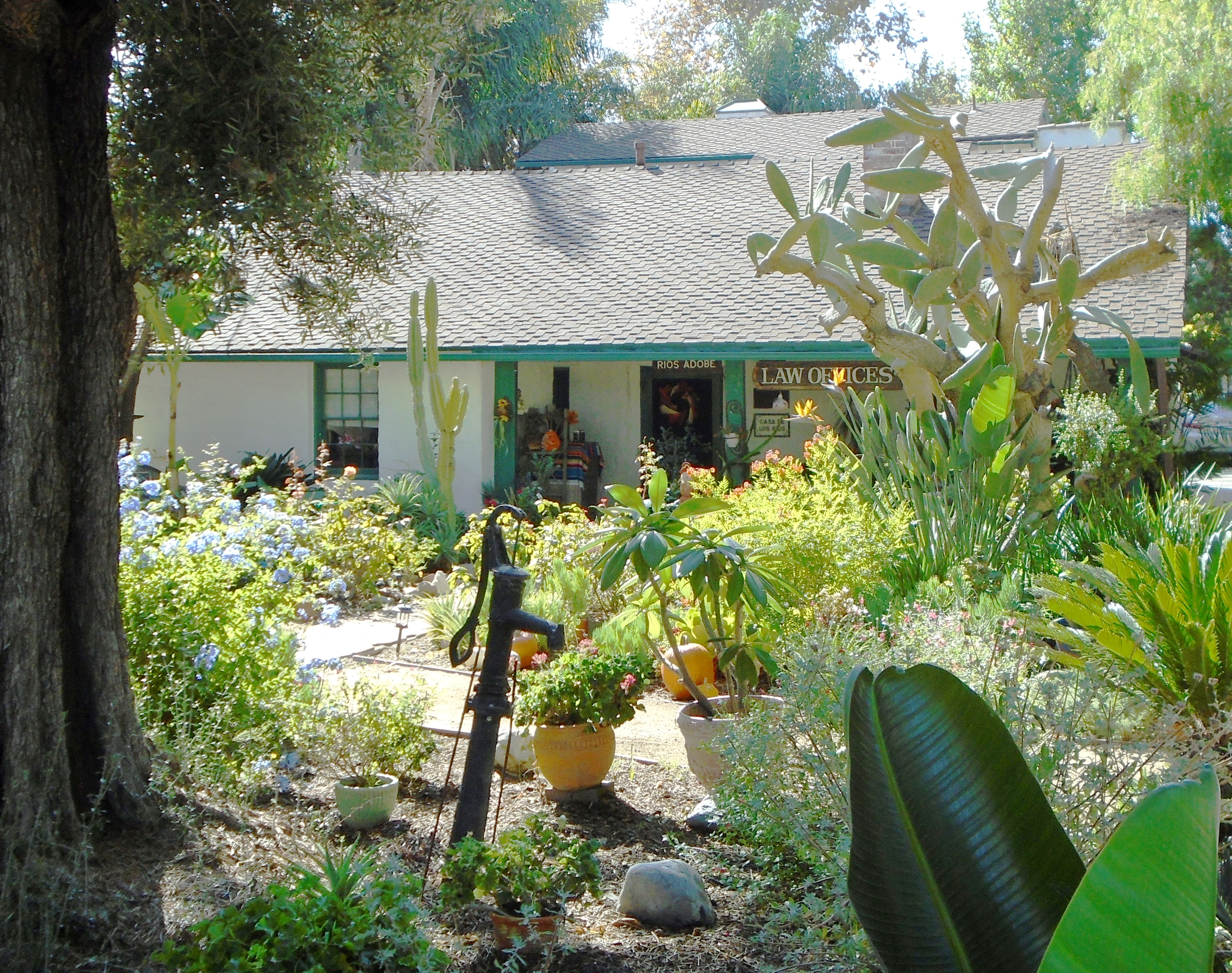
No. 31781

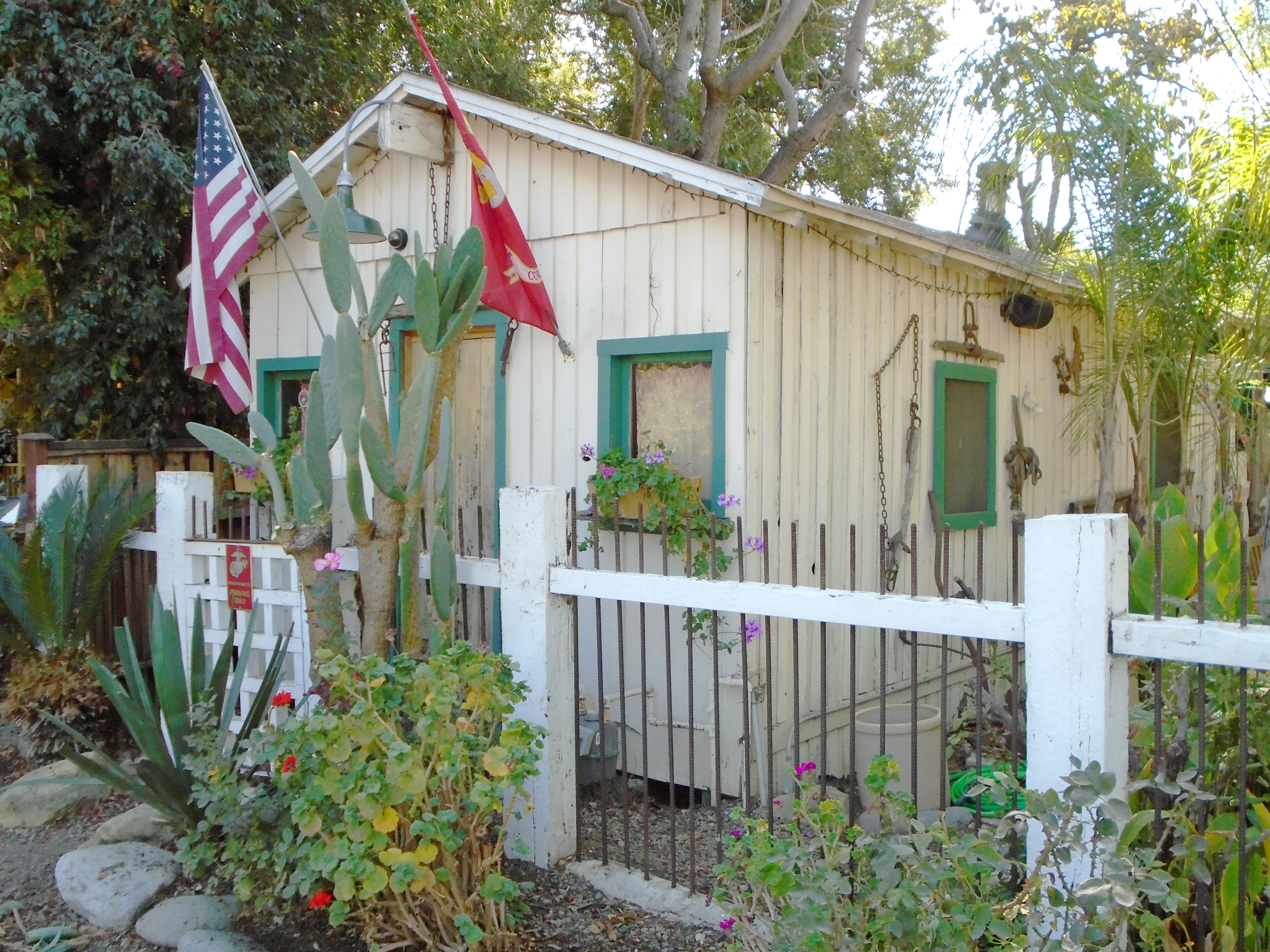
No. 31786

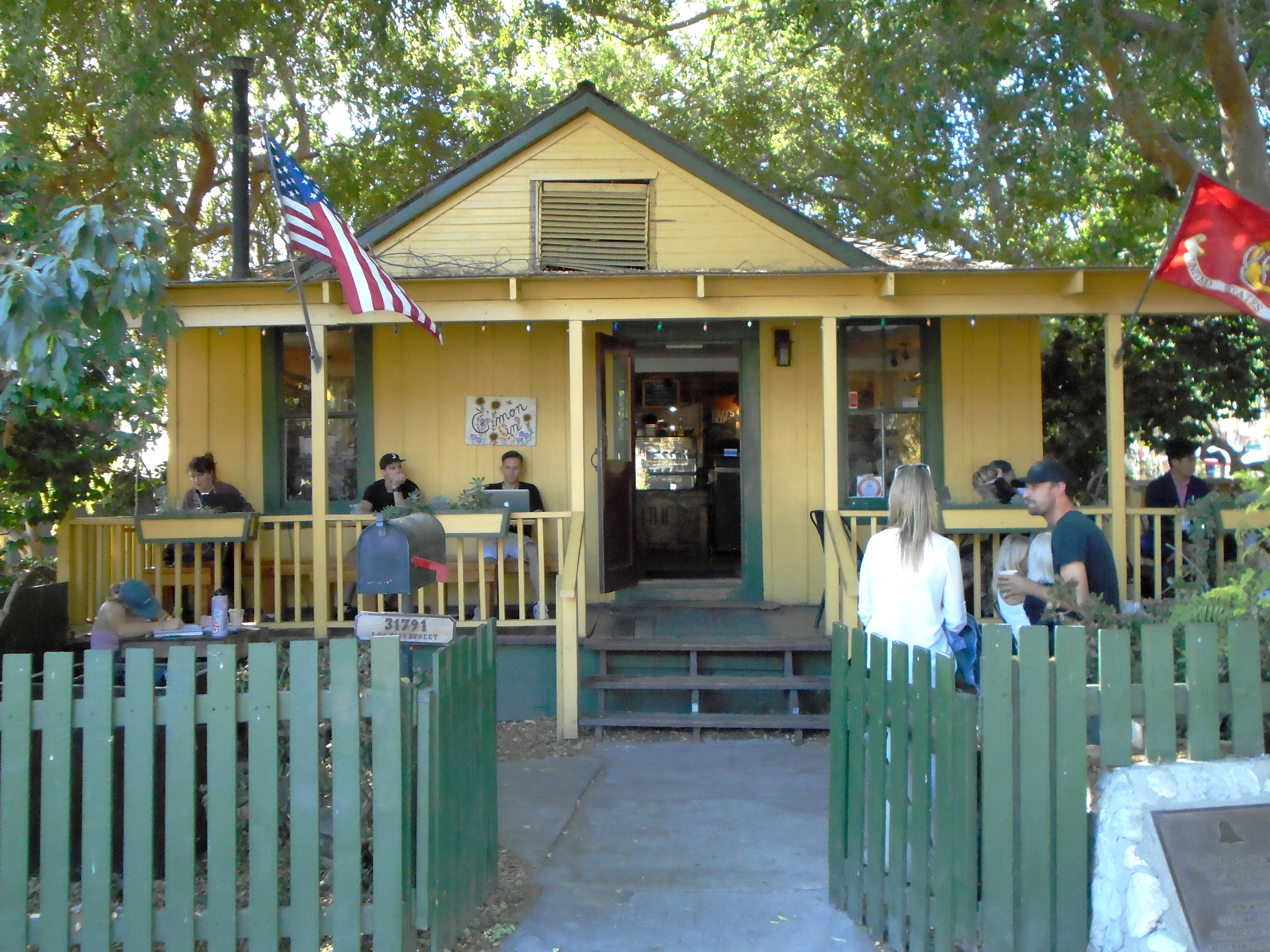
No. 31791

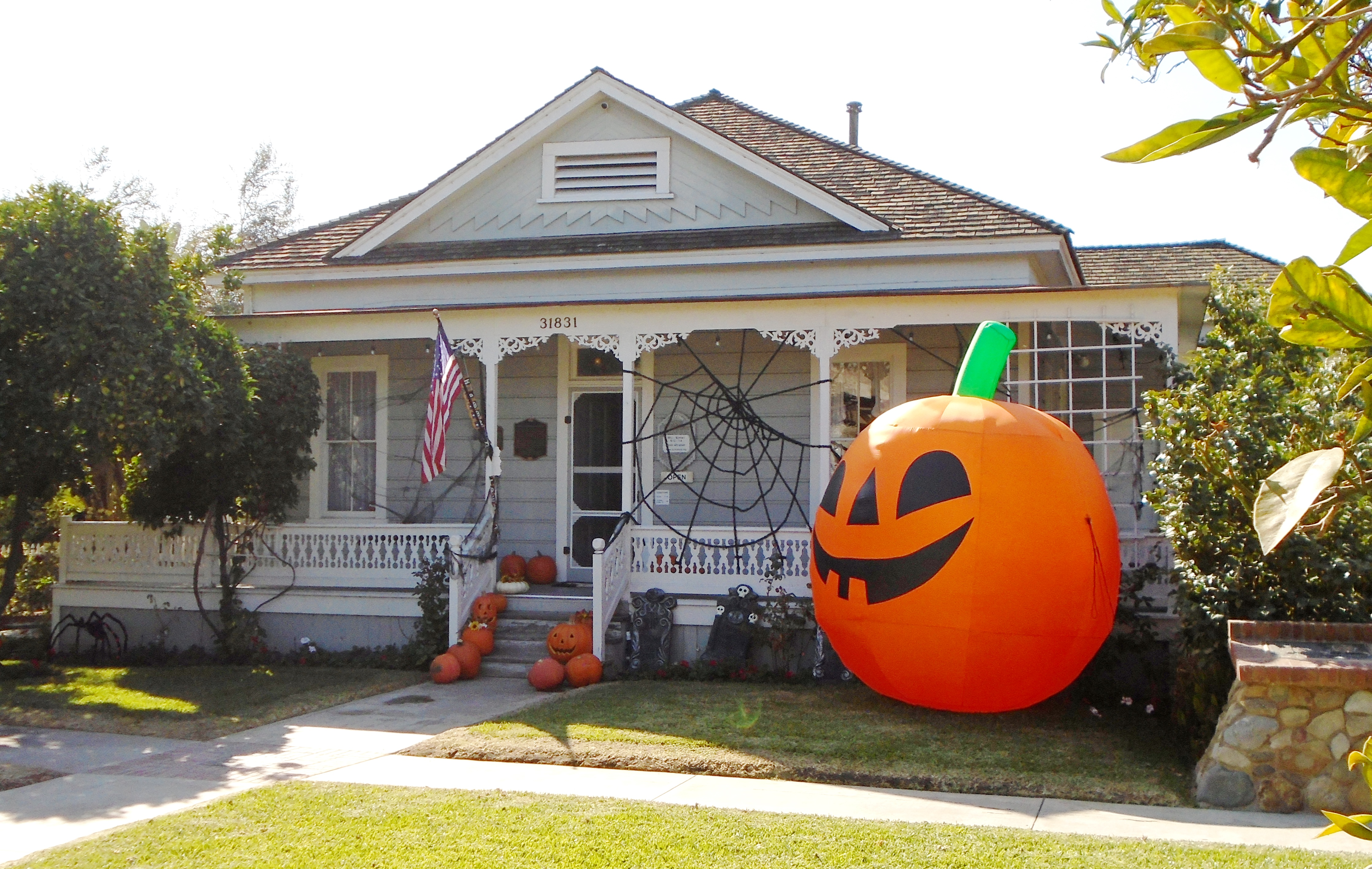
No. 31831, the O'Neill Museum of the San Juan Capistrano Historical Society
