= Arroyo Bird House Park =

Park in California

- Location within the Los Angeles metropolitan area Location within California Location within the United States
- Interactive map of Arroyo Bird House Park
- Type: Urban
- Coordinates: 33.5073°N 117.6425°W

Arroyo Bird House Park is a small urban park next to the San Juan Creek Trail in San Juan Capistrano, California, United States. Community-led, it contains many colorful birdhouses and is managed by the city. Many of the birdhouses are engraved with dedications from the people who added them. Locals have placed statues and handmade ornaments near the houses as well.

== History ==
The community formerly maintained the park, but the San Juan Capistrano City Council took over in November 2023. They had previously begun planning for the acquisition in May, with Howard Hart, the mayor, and Troy Bourne, a council member, meeting with citizens to voice their concerns about the safety of residents utilizing the adjacent trail. The city plans to remove the birdhouses temporarily before planting new vegetation and adding benches and more shade. Construction began in January 2024. The renovation is forecast to cost over $160,000 and be finished by late 2024.
