= Panhe =

Acjachemen village site in Southern California, U.S.

Coordinates: 33°23′50″N 117°35′27″W

Panhe (Acjachemen: "the place at the water") was one of the largest Acjachemen villages in Southern California. It dates back more than 9,600 years ago.

Panhe has been a sacred, ceremonial, cultural, and burial site for the Acjachemen people. The site of Panhe is now within San Onofre State Beach, San Diego County, California, located at the mouth of San Mateo Canyon and Cristianitos Canyon, and approximately 3.7 miles (6.0 km) upstream from the Pacific Ocean. Mission's records have shown evidence of many Acjachemen's ancestry in Panhe.

Panhe village site has received multiple official recognitions including Determination of Eligibility for the National Register of Historic Place by the National Park Service, recognition from the State Historic Preservation Office, and was integrated as part of the San Mateo Archeological District. Additionally, Panhe was recognized as Sacred Lands by the California Native American Heritage Commission in 1989. Serving as an additional layer of protection for Panhe, developers intending to intrude upon the site for construction purposes must undergo scrutiny through the Sacred Lands inventory as part of the California Environmental Quality Act (CEQA) environmental review process. These official acknowledgement serves as a protective mechanism for the Acjachemen in terms of legal issues. One significant recognition that Panhe village site has yet to obtain is the a Traditional Cultural Property, which will grant the Acjachemen tribe further legal protection over the area. Conserving Panhe is part of a significance continuing effort in asserting sovereignty of the Acjachemen land.

The Acjachemen people fished in San Mateo Creek's extensive freshwater marshes and practiced a hunter-gatherer lifestyle. The village of Panhe is estimated to have had a population of about 300 before the first Spanish explorers came to the area and remains a sacred site for the Acjachemen people.

Panhe is the site of the first baptism in California and in 1769 saw the first close contact between Spanish explorers, Catholic missionaries, and the Acjachemen people. The village had the greatest number of baptisms in the records of Mission San Juan Capistrano.

Panhe was nearly destroyed by a planned toll road construction that was meant to connect to Interstate 5, but this was stopped by a coalition of Acjachemen people, environmentalists, and surfer groups.

Acjachemen descendants hosts an annual festival at the site to honor their ancestors and to partake in their culture together. The United Coalition to Protect Panhe and The City Project advocate for the preservation of the site.

== Present day ==
Panhe is currently under the control of Camp Pendleton Marine Base, San Onofre State Beach in San Clemente .

== Toll road ==
Panhe village site was in danger when the proposal for a toll road with six lanes intended to link a recent development to Interstate 5 came out more than a decade ago. Through effort by the Acjachemen activists, environmentalists and surfers groups, in 2016, the decision to conserve the site was mutually reached.

In 2002, local residents became aware of a plan put forth by the Foothill/Eastern Transportation Corridor Agency (TCA) to construct a six-lane toll road linking a proposed new development to Interstate 5. Approximately two miles of this proposed route would closely parallel San Mateo Creek, situated just 20 feet from the existing Panhe site. Environmental organizations, such as the Sierra Club, were already expressing concerns about the toll road's proximity to environmentally sensitive zones within the San Mateo watershed. The potential destruction of San Mateo Creek, which flows into Trestles surf beach, raised additional worries among environmentalists, as it could adversely impact the renowned wave quality of Trestles.

As word spread within the surfing community about the potential threat, a widespread movement emerged in San Clemente with "Save Trestles, Stop the Toll Road" bumper stickers, lawn signs, and T-shirts appearing throughout the area. The international surfing community also took notice once the issue garnered significant concern among surfers.

In 2006, the California Native American Heritage Commission (CNAHC) sued the TCA on behalf of the Acjachemen. The lawsuit contended that the destruction of Panhe would constitute a serious infringement on the religious freedom of the Acjachemen people.

== See also ==
- Indigenous peoples of California
- California mission clash of cultures

Native American villages in Orange County, California:

- Acjacheme
- Ahunx
- Alauna
- Genga
- Hutuknga
- Lupukngna
- Moyongna
- Pajbenga
- Panhe
- Puhú
- Piwiva
- Totpavit
