= History of Orange County, California =

The history of Orange County begins with Acjachemen indigenous peoples who lived sustainably off the land. Spanish colonization starting in this area around 1769 introduced missions and ranchos, which later transitioned to American control after California joined the United States following its gold rush in 1848. The gold rush and railroads spurred economic and population growth throughout the state, leading to the founding of towns like Anaheim and Santa Ana.

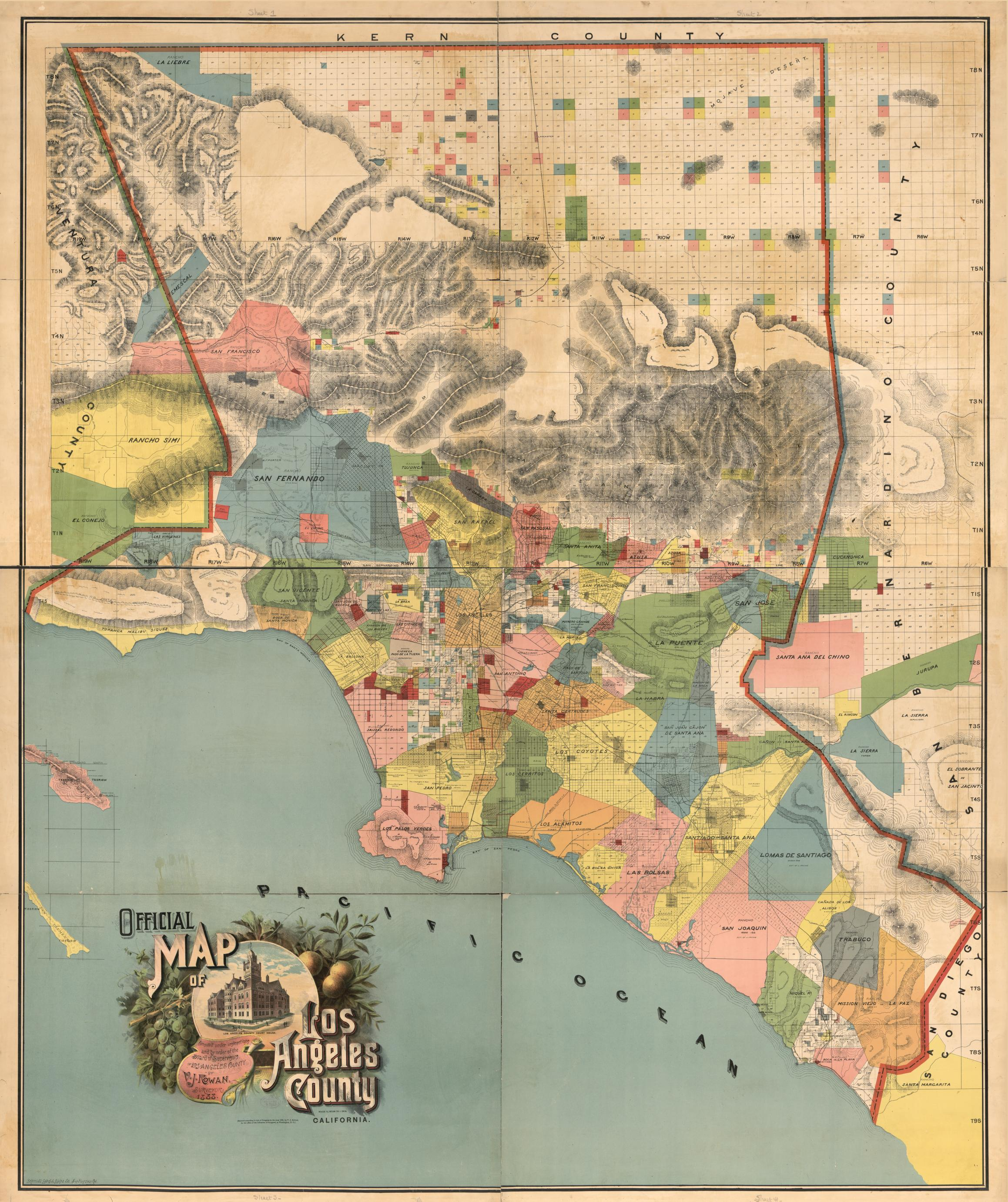
Orange County was part the Ranchos of Los Angeles County before before the separation and establishment in (1888)

In 1889, Orange County separated from Los Angeles County. Agriculture, especially citrus, dominated until the mid-20th century, alongside oil and transportation development. After World War II, suburban expansion replaced farmland, and cities rapidly grew. The 1955 opening of Disneyland marked a shift toward tourism. Today, Orange County is a major urban center with over three million residents and 34 incorporated cities.

== History ==
=== Indigenous ===
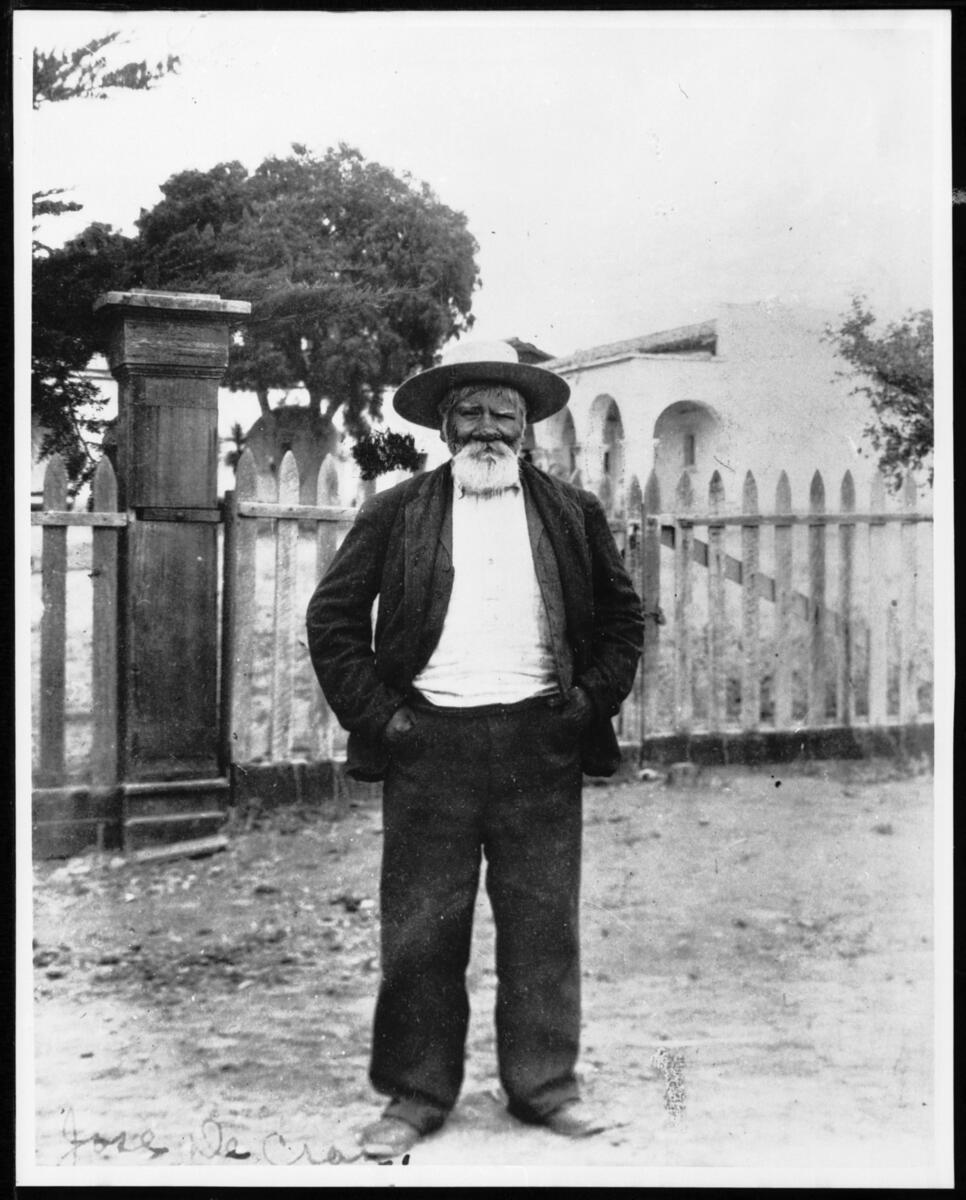
José de Grácia Cruz was a Acjachemen man indigenous to the area that is now Orange County.

Archeological evidence shows the area to have been inhabited beginning about 9,500 years ago. At the time of European contact, the northern area of what is now Orange County was primarily inhabited by the Tongva indigenous people, a part of Tovaangar, while the southern area of the county, below Aliso Creek, was primarily inhabited by the Acjachemen. Both groups lived in villages throughout the area. Large villages were sometimes multiethnic and multilingual, such as Genga, located in what is now Newport Beach. The village was shared by the Tongva and Acjachemen. The village of Puhú was located in what is now Black Star Canyon and was shared by multiple groups, including the Tongva, Acjachemen, Serrano and Payómkawichum.

The mother village of the Acjachemen was Putuidem and is now located in San Juan Capistrano underneath JSerra Catholic High School. For the Tongva, north Orange County was at the southern extent of their village sites. In coastal villages like Lupukngna, at least 3,000 years old located in what is now Huntington Beach, villagers likely used te'aats or plank boats to navigate the coastline, with fish and shellfish being more central to the diet. In inland villages such as Hutuknga, rabbit and mule deer were more central, in addition to acorns from oak trees and seeds from grasses and sage bushes common everywhere.

=== Spanish mission period ===
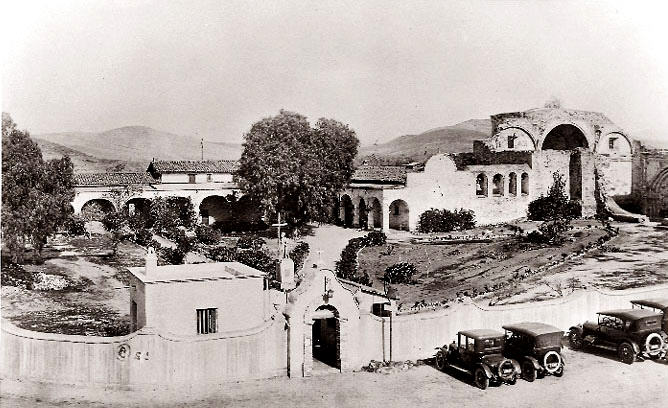
From 1776 to 1833, there were 4,317 baptisms and 3,153 deaths of native people recorded at Mission San Juan Capistrano (pictured in 1921).

After the 1769 expedition of Gaspar de Portolà, a Spanish expedition led by Junipero Serra named the area Valle de Santa Ana (Valley of Saint Anne). On November 1, 1776, Mission San Juan Capistrano became the area's first permanent European settlement. Among those who came with Portolá were José Manuel Nieto and José Antonio Yorba. Both these men were given land grants—Rancho Los Nietos and Rancho Santiago de Santa Ana, respectively.

The Nieto heirs were granted land in 1834. The Nieto ranches were known as Rancho Los Alamitos, Rancho Las Bolsas, and Rancho Los Coyotes. Yorba heirs Bernardo Yorba and Teodosio Yorba were also granted Rancho Cañón de Santa Ana (Santa Ana Canyon Ranch) and Rancho Lomas de Santiago, respectively. Other ranchos in Orange County were granted by the Mexican government during the Mexican period in Alta California.

Saint Junípero Serra y Ferrer and the early components of the Portolá Expedition arrived in modern-day San Diego, south of present-day Orange County, in mid-late 1769. During these early Mission years, however, the early immigrants continued to rely on imports of both Mexican-grown and Spanish-grown wines; Serra repeatedly complained of the process of repeated, labored import. The first grape crop production was produced in 1782 at San Juan Capistrano, with vines potentially brought through supply ships in 1778.

=== 19th century ===
Viticulture became an increasingly important crop in Los Angeles and Orange Counties through the subsequent decades. By the 1850s, the regions supported more than 100 vineyards. In 1857, Anaheim was founded by 50 German-Americans (with lineage extending back to Franconia) in search of a suitable grape-growing region. This group purchased a 1,165 acres (4.71 km^{2}) parcel from Juan Pacifico Ontiveros's Rancho San Juan Cajon de Santa Ana for $2 per acre and later formed the Anaheim Vineyard Company. With surveyor George Hansen, two of the wine colony's founders, John Frohling and Charles Kohler, planted 400,000 grapevines along the Santa Ana River; by 1875, "there were as many as 50 wineries in Anaheim, and the city's wine production topped 1 million gallons annually." Despite later afflictions of both Phylloxera and Pierce's Disease, wine growing is still practiced.

A severe drought in the 1860s devastated the prevailing industry, cattle ranching, and much land came into the possession of Richard O'Neill Sr., James Irvine and other land barons. In 1887, silver was discovered in the Santa Ana Mountains, attracting settlers via the Santa Fe and Southern Pacific Railroads. High rates of Anglo migration gradually moved Mexicans into colonias, or segregated ethnic enclaves.

==== County establishment ====
Los Angeles County before the secession of Orange County in 1889

After several failed attempts in previous sessions, the California State Legislature passed a bill authorizing the portion of Los Angeles County south of Coyote Creek to hold a referendum on whether to remain part of Los Angeles County or to secede and form a new county to be named "Orange" as directed by the legislature. The county is said to have been named for the citrus fruit in an attempt to promote immigration by suggesting a semi-tropical paradise – a place where anything could grow. James William Towner, a large landowner in Santa Ana and former member of the Oneida Community, was appointed by the then governor to hold the referendum. The referendum required a 2/3 vote for secession to take place, and on June 4, 1889, the vote was 2,509 to 500 in favor of secession. After the referendum, Los Angeles County filed three lawsuits to prevent the secession, but their attempts were futile.

On July 17, 1889, a second referendum was held south of the Coyote Creek to determine if the county seat of the new county would be Anaheim or Santa Ana, along with an election for every county officer. Santa Ana defeated Anaheim in the referendum. With the referendum having passed, the County of Orange was officially incorporated on August 1, 1889. Much of the land around the future county courthouse were owned by members of the Oneida Community, and Towner would become the county's first Superior Court judge. Since the incorporation of the county, the only geographical changes made to the boundary was when the County and Los Angeles County traded some parcels of land around Coyote Creek to conform to city blocks. In 1919, the California State Legislature redefined the county's boundary with Los Angeles County to no longer follow Coyote Creek but instead along Public Land Survey System township lines instead.

=== 20th century ===
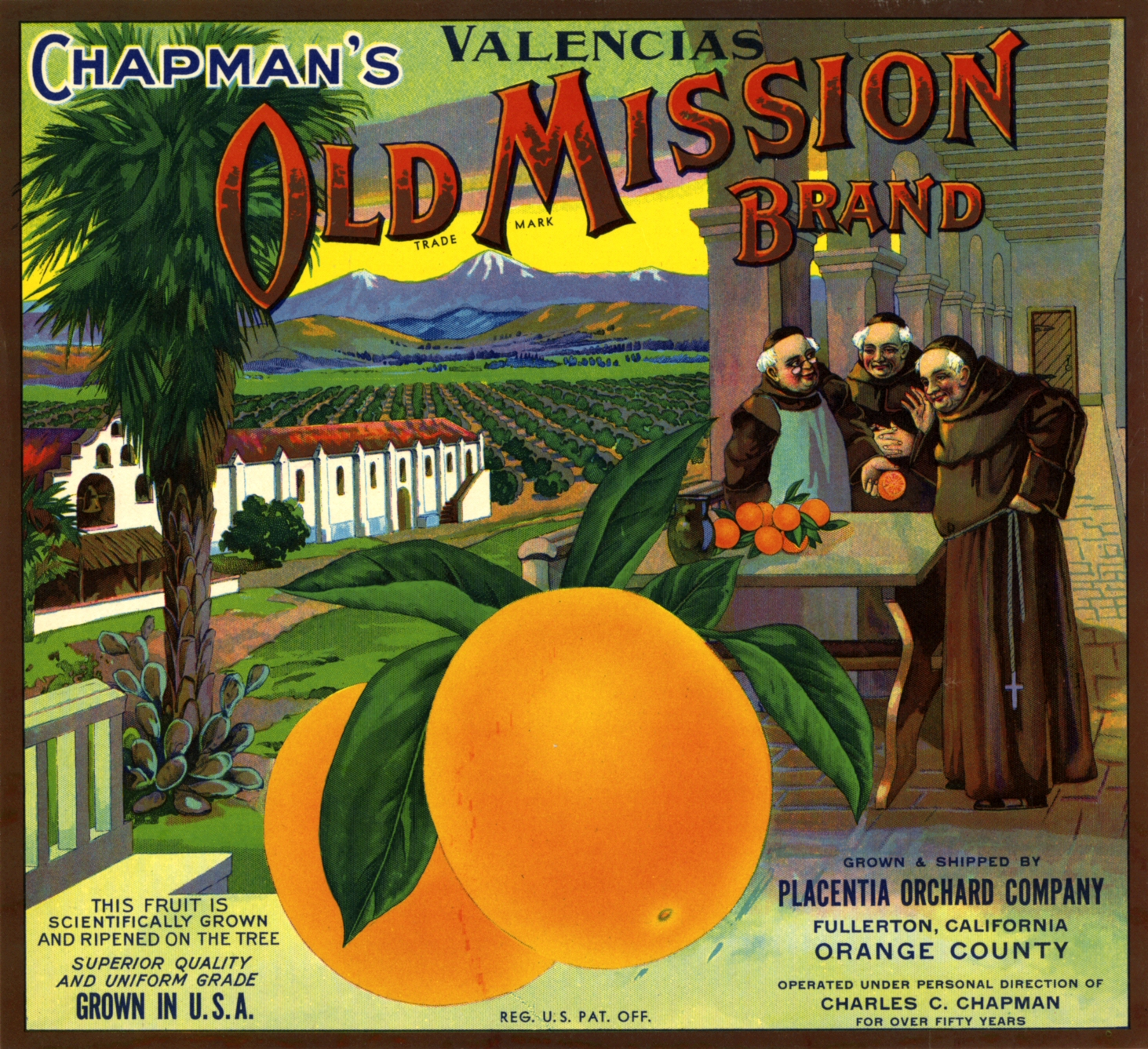
Advertisement for the Valencia orange, which became the major industrial crop by the 1920s

Other citrus crops, avocados, and oil extraction were also important to the early economy. Orange County benefited from the July 4, 1904, completion of the Pacific Electric Railway, a trolley connecting Los Angeles with Santa Ana and Newport Beach. The link made Orange County an accessible weekend retreat for celebrities of early Hollywood. It was deemed so significant that Pacific City changed its name to Huntington Beach in honor of Henry E. Huntington, president of the Pacific Electric and nephew of Collis Huntington. Transportation further improved with the completion of the State Route and U.S. Route 101 (now mostly Interstate 5) in the 1920s.

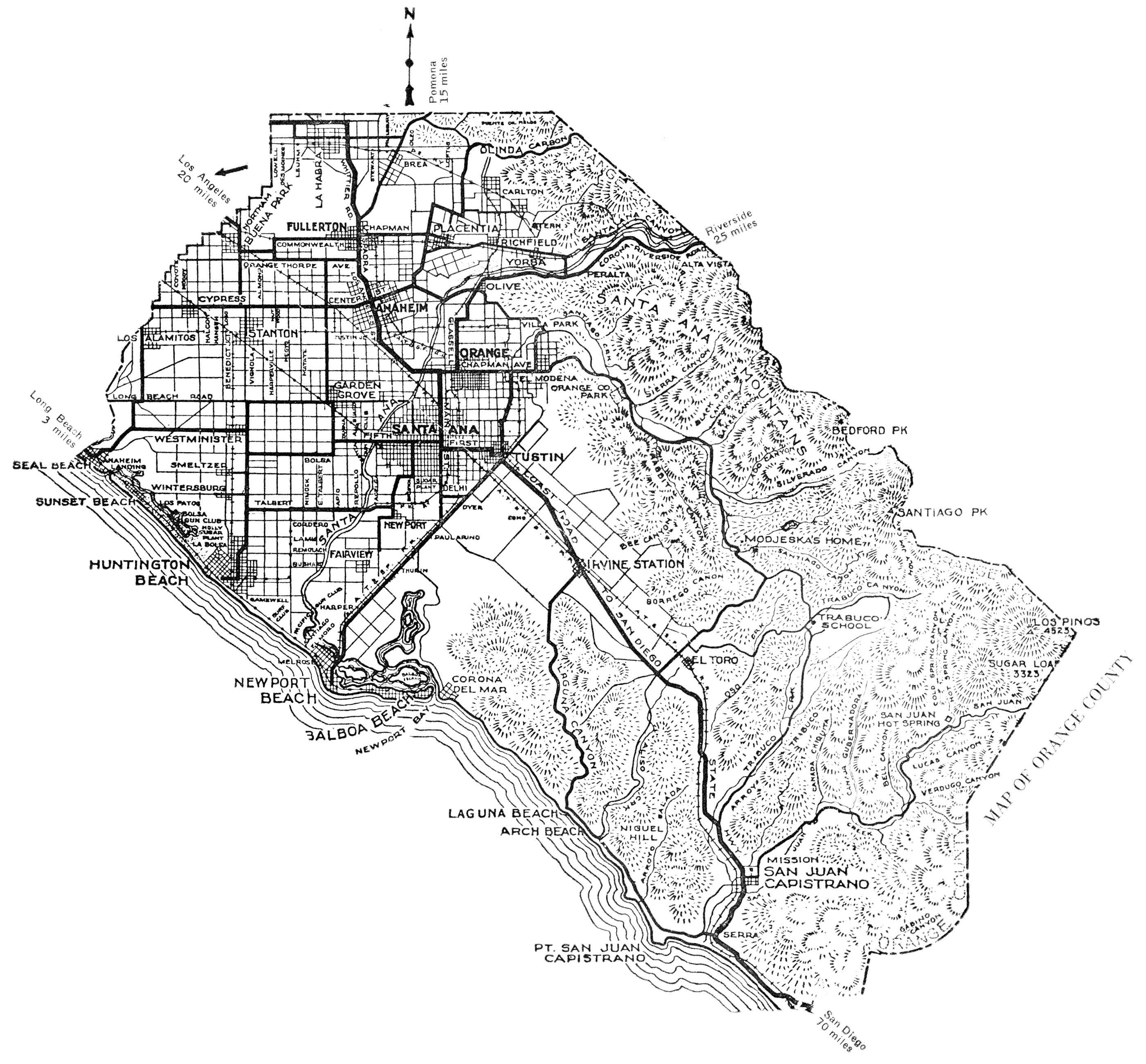
Orange County map, 1921

In the 1910s, agriculture in Orange County was largely centered on grains, hay, and potatoes by small farmers, accounting for 60% of the county's exports. The Segerstroms and Irvines once produced so many lima beans that the county was called "Beanville". By 1920, fruit and nut exports exploded, which led to the increase of industrialized farming and the decline of family farms. For example, by 1917, William Chapman came to own 350,000 acres in northeastern Orange County from the Valencia orange. Around the 1910s and 1920s, most of the barrios of Orange County, such as in Santa Ana, further developed as company towns of Mexican laborers, who worked in the industrial orange groves. Poor working conditions resulted in the Citrus Strike of 1936, in which more than half of the orange industry's workforce, largely Mexican, demanded better working conditions. The strike was heavily repressed, with forced evictions and state-sanctioned violence being used as tactics of suppression. Carey McWilliams referred to the suppression as "the toughest violation of civil rights in the nation."

The Los Angeles flood of 1938 devastated some areas of Orange County, with most of the effects being in Santa Ana and Anaheim, which were flooded with six feet of water. As an eight-foot-high rush of water further spilled out of the Santa Ana Canyon, forty-three people were killed in the predominately Mexican communities of Atwood and La Jolla in Placentia. The devastation from this event, as well as from the 1939 California tropical storm, meant that Orange County was in need of new infrastructure, which was supported by the New Deal. This included the construction of numerous schools, city halls, post offices, parks, libraries, and fire stations, as well as the improvement of road infrastructure throughout Orange County.

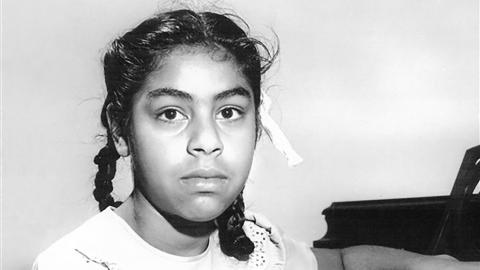
Mendez v. Westminster (1947) overturned racial segregation in California schools. The case was initiated when Sylvia Mendez (pictured) was turned away from enrolling at a primary school in Westminster.

School segregation between Mexican and white students in Orange County was widespread in the mid-1940s, with 80% of Mexican students attending 14 segregated schools. These schools taught Mexican children manual education – or gardening, bootmaking, blacksmithing, and carpentry for Mexican boys and sewing and homemaking for girls – while white schools taught academic preparation. The landmark case Mendez vs. Westminster (1947) desegregated Orange County schools, after the Mendez family were denied enrollment into the 17th Street School in Westminster in 1944, despite their cousins with lighter skin being admitted, and were instead told to enroll at the Hoover Elementary School for Mexican children.

In the 1950s, agriculture, such as that involving the boysenberries made famous by Buena Park native Walter Knott, began to decline. However, the county's prosperity soared during this time. The completion of Interstate 5 in 1954 helped make Orange County a bedroom community for many who moved to Southern California to work in aerospace and manufacturing. Orange County received a further economic boost in 1955 with the opening of Disneyland.

In 1969, Yorba Linda-born Orange County native Richard Nixon became the 37th President of the United States. He established a "Western White House" in San Clemente, in South Orange County, known as La Casa Pacifica, and visited throughout his presidency.

In the late 1970s, Vietnamese and Latino immigrants began to populate central Orange County.

In the 1980s, Orange County had become the second most populous county in California as the population topped two million for the first time.

In the 1990s, red foxes became common in Orange County as a non-native mesopredator, with increasing urban development pushing out coyote and mountain lion populations to the county's shrinking natural areas.

In 1994, an investment fund meltdown led to the criminal prosecution of treasurer Robert Citron. The county lost at least $1.5 billion through high-risk investments in bonds. The loss was blamed on derivatives by some media reports. On December 6, 1994, the County of Orange declared Chapter 9 bankruptcy, from which it emerged on June 12, 1996. The Orange County bankruptcy was at the time the largest municipal bankruptcy in U.S. history.

Land use conflicts arose between established areas in the north and less developed areas in the south. These conflicts were over issues such as construction of new toll roads and the repurposing of a decommissioned air base. El Toro Marine Corps Air Station was designated by a voter measure in 1994 to be developed into an international airport to complement the existing John Wayne Airport. But subsequent voter initiatives and court actions caused the airport plan to be permanently shelved. It has developed into the Orange County Great Park and housing.

=== 21st century ===

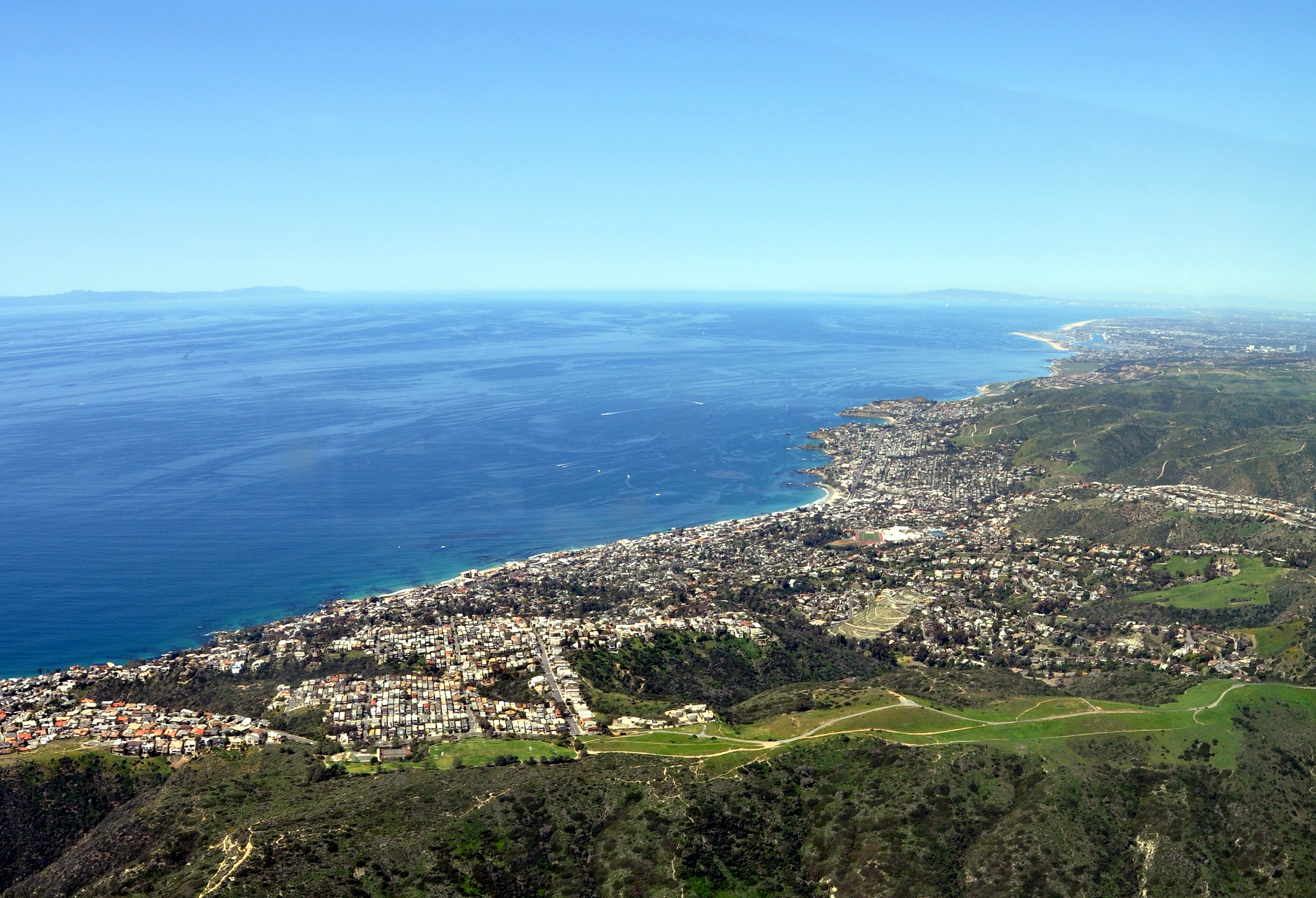
Laguna Beach in 2010 (with Newport Beach in background)

In the 21st century, the social landscape of Orange County has continued to change. The opioid epidemic saw a rise in Orange County, with unintentional overdoses becoming the third highest contributor of deaths by 2014. As in other areas, the deaths disproportionately occurred in the homeless population. However, deaths were widespread among affluent and poorer areas in Orange County, with the highest at-risk group being Caucasian males between the ages of 45–55. A 2018 study found that supply reduction was not sufficient to preventing deaths.

In 2008, a report issued by the Orange County Superior Court found that the county was experiencing a pet "overpopulation problem," with the growing number of pets leading to an increase in euthanasias at the Orange County Animal Shelter to 13,000 for the year alone.

Following the 2016 presidential election, Santa Ana become a sanctuary city for the protection of those immigrants who worked around the legally established process of becoming a legal resident in Orange and other California counties. This created an intense debate in Orange County surrounding politics toward unlawful immigration, with many cities opposing pro-immigration policies.

The COVID-19 pandemic in Orange County disproportionately affected lower income and Latino residents.

Implementation of renewable energy and climate change awareness in Orange County increased, with the city of Irvine pledging to be a zero-carbon economy by 2030 and Buena Park, Huntington Beach, and Fullerton pledging to move to 100% clean energy. Residential solar panel installation has rapidly increased, even among middle-income families, as a result of the state's residential solar program which began in 2006.

In the 2010s, campaigns to conserve remaining natural areas gained awareness. By the early 2020s, some success was found, with the conservation of 24 acres in the West Coyote Hills of a total 510 acres and the Genga/Banning Ranch project moving forward, conserving some 385 acres, which was part of the Tongva village area of Genga. In 2021, the commemorative 1.5 acre Putuidem village opened after years of delays and campaigning by the Acjachemen.
