= Moyongna =

Former Tongva village or landmark site in Newport Beach, California

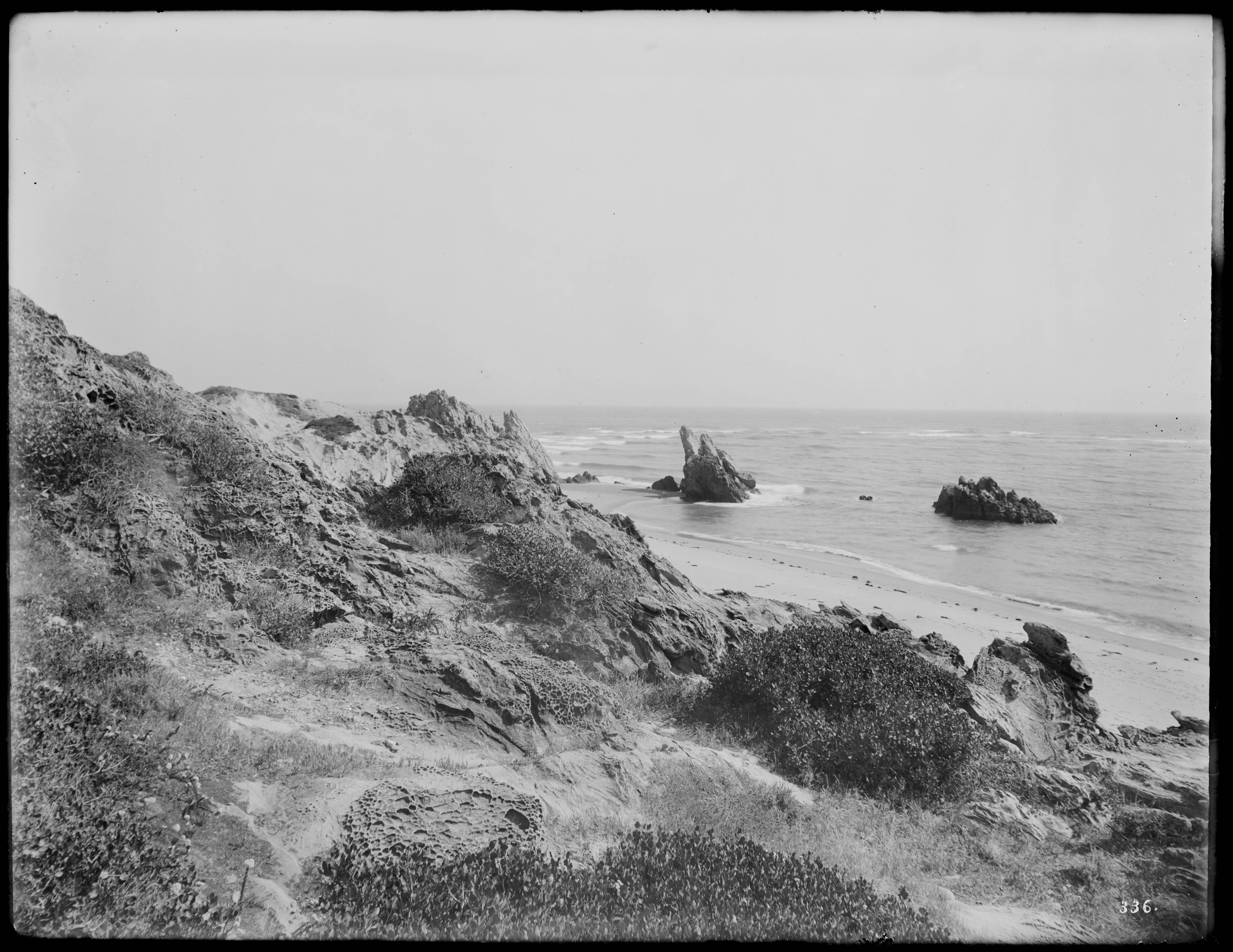
Moyongna was located in the area of Corona del Mar (pictured 1910).

Moyongna, alternatively spelled Moyonga, was a coastal Tongva village or landmark site located near the entrance of Newport Bay in Newport Beach, California near Corona del Mar. As a coastal village, the usage of te'aats was likely important to the village's people. Nearby coastal villages included Genga, located on Newport Mesa, and Lupukngna, located near the mouth of the Santa Ana River.

The root word Moyo in the Tongva language has been linked with Corona del Mar, similar to Lupuk being linked with Bolsa Chica. The site may have been too disturbed by urbanization to note any precise location. Some researchers have placed the location at the Newporter Inn in Corona Del Mar, which was built in the early 1960s, although others have referred to this as based on scanty evidence.

As noted in 1962, signs of Indigenous inhabitance along this area of the coast was common: "Almost every ridge that ends at the sea between Corona del Mar and Dana Point has its soil flecked with charcoal, marine shells, and bits of bone."

In one map of the area published in 1978, the village was incorrectly labeled as Mocuachem, a Payómkawichum village that was otherwise recorded in most other sources as located in the Las Pulgas area.

== See also ==
Other Native American villages in Orange County, California:

- Acjacheme
- Ahunx
- Alume
- Genga
- Hutuknga
- Lupukngna
- Pajbenga
- Piwiva
- Puhú
- Putiidhem
- Totpavit
