= Pajbenga =

Former Tongva village in Santa Ana, California

Pajbenga, alternative spelling Pagbigna and Pasbengna, was a Tongva village located at Santa Ana, California, near the El Refugio Adobe, which was the home of José Sepulveda (now located near the intersection of Raitt Street and Myrtle Street). It was one of the main villages along the Santa Ana River, including Lupukngna, Genga, Totpavit, and Hutuknga. People from the village were recorded in mission records as Pajebet, Pajbet, Pajbebet, and Pajbepet.

Pajbenga may have had a population between 100 and 250 residents. Like many surrounding villages, Pajbenga's residents likely subsisted on oak trees for acorns and seeds from various grasses and sage bushes. Rabbit and mule deer were also likely consumed for meat. The village also presumably had deep trade connections with coastal villages and those further inland.

Between 1776 and 1807, 13 people were baptized from the village, including 2 men, 4 women, and 7 children as part of the larger colonial project of Christian conversion of Indigenous peoples at Spanish missions in California. Like surrounding villages, residents were most likely baptized at Mission San Gabriel and Mission San Juan Capistrano.

Some maps have placed Pajbenga on the eastern bank of the Santa Ana River at the center of Santa Ana, while others place it right across the western bank at the confluence of the Santa Ana River and the Santiago Creek.

== See also ==
Native American villages in Orange County, California:

- Acjacheme
- Ahunx
- Alauna
- Genga
- Hutukngna
- Lupukngna
- Moyongna
- Piwiva
- Puhú
- Putiidhem
- Totpavit
