= Putuidem =

Former Acjachemen village in San Juan Capistrano, California

- Village
- Location of the former village in California
- Coordinates: 33°31′08″N 117°40′05″W
- Country: United States
- State: California
- County: Orange
- City: San Juan Capistrano
- Time zone: UTC-8
  - Summer (DST): UTC-7
- ZIP: 92675
- Area code: 949

Putuidem (Acjachemen: "belly" or "the navel"), alternative spelling Putiidhem or Putuidhem, was a large Native village of the Acjachemen people, also referred to as Juaneño after the relocation of the Acjachemen to Mission San Juan Capistrano. Putuidem was a mother village, a community that spawned other villages of the tribe.

The site is situated in what is currently San Juan Capistrano, California just off Interstate 5, about a mile north of the mission. It is now buried underneath the sports field and performing arts center of JSerra Catholic High School, which began construction with approval from the city in 2003 after protest and lawsuits to preserve it.

In 2021, the Putuidem Village Park was opened in the city to commemorate the village.

== History ==
=== Indigenous ===
The village sat at the site of a spring, and was founded by Chief Oyaison, also spelled Oyison, who left Sejat after an extreme drought, and his daughter Coronne. In a story of the village, Coronne led a migration to a spring, near the confluence of Oso Creek and Trabuco Creek. Coronne died suddenly and her body became a mound of earth. The grieving people returned to Putuidem and slept in a pyramid shape, referred to as acjachema, which gave the Acjachemen their name. Coronne, who had a lump at her navel, gave the village its name.

In one source citing Gerónimo Boscana, it is stated that the village "was later ruled by a relative called Choqual who also ruled Atoum-pumcaxque" (the nearby village of Acjacheme). Putuidem was located upstream from the coastal village of Toovunga and downstream from the villages of Alume (via Trabuco Creek), Sajavit (via San Juan Creek), Piwiva (via San Juan Creek), and Huumai (via San Juan Creek).

=== Mission period ===
In 1776, Mission San Juan Capistrano was constructed adjacent to Putuidem as well as the nearby village of Ahachmai, which significantly affected the village, depleting its population to serve the mission. The village soon became depleted with the increased arrival of Europeans. At the same time, the mission expanded and grew, with 383 converts by 1783, many of which were likely from Putuidem, and 741 converts by 1790.

Recent converts or neophytes did the vast majority of labor on the mission, taking care of the herds and grain crops. After nine years of construction, a stone church at the mission was completed in 1806, with a high tower and five interior arches of stone "all the work of the neophytes." By 1810, there were 1,138 neophytes, peaking at 1,361 in 1812, and declining thereafter. The stone church was destroyed in the 1812 San Juan Capistrano earthquake, which killed nearly 50 native people who were attending mass. After the secularization of the mission in 1833, a total of 4,317 natives had been baptized at the mission, 1,689 of whom were adults and 2,628 of whom were children. The number of deaths at the mission was 3,158. Many of the people who survived the mission period settled in the surrounding areas.

=== American occupation ===
In 1933, it was noted that the nearby Putuidem spring, referred to by the Spanish as El Aguagito or El Aguajito could be found 0.8 miles north of Highway 101 at a spot where an old sycamore tree stood. The land was owned by Aaron Buchheim in 1933, whose descendant sold it to Junipero Serra High School. Approximately five hundred descendants of the villagers continued to live in the San Juan Capistrano area.

Evidence of ceremonial burials and cremations, sacred artifacts, golden eagle and condor bone fragments, which have been linked to and are sacred to Chinigchinich, were found in the soil around the village site. Archaeologists estimated that two hundred burials occurred around Putuidem, with sites thousands of years older being located closer to the sacred spring of the village.

==== Burial under Junípero Serra Catholic High School ====
A new Catholic high school, JSerra Catholic High School, was slated to serve south Orange County in 1998. After a deal to acquire the original location fell through, they selected a parcel on Junipero Serra Road, part of which they knew was sacred to the Acjachemen. They met with tribal leader David Belardes, who was designated as the MLD (most likely descendant) for the project, a requirement under California state law. Anthropologist Alma Gottlieb reported that Belardes had told her that he had lost many battles against development for years, and had given up on opposing development.

Belardes led only the smallest of three Acjachemen groups, and two larger groups, led by Damien Shilo and Sonia Johnston, rejected the agreement, demanding the land be reserved for a cultural center. They formed a coalition known as Spirit of Capistrano, joined by environmentalists and the residents of a neighboring condominium complex. Patricia Martz, a professor at California State University, Los Angeles who joined the opposition, estimated as many as 175 bodies could be buried on the site. Others, like local archaeologist Henry Koerper at Cypress College, cast doubt on those estimates, noting that only seven burial plots had been discovered.

Two lawsuits were filed, and opponents attempted to hold a public referendum on the project, but they failed to gather enough signatures, and the city eventually approved construction of the gymnasium, athletic facilities, and performing arts complex. Construction began in 2003 to much protest. There were concerns that additional artifacts and ancestor remains were unearthed during the construction process and buried in a location only known to Belardes. The Acjachemen people who opposed development protested and organized to stop construction prior to and during its construction. Other Indigenous peoples of California, including the Tongva, MeXica (Mexican Indigenous activists) and pro-Aztlán activists from Santa Ana, as well as low-income Mexican immigrants from nearby cities came to oppose development.

Critics of the development observed that the high school was to be named after Junípero Serra, the founder of the same local mission that originally displaced the residents of the Putuidem village. Other critics have called the development an extension of America's removal of Indigenous people and an erasure of Acjachemen culture. The high school itself has addressed the history of the site in their student newspaper, The Paw Print. Custodians of the high school made claims of paranormal activity at the complex.

==== Putuidem Village Park ====
In 2015, the Acjachemen and city of San Juan Capistrano began working toward constructing a 1.3-acre park (0.53 ha) north of the high school. The park was to feature a statue of Coronne, a small amphitheater, traditional style buildings, interpretative displays, and a cultural center. In late 2021, the park was opened after many delays and is listed as The Village of Putuidem.

The Northwest Open Space, in which the village park is located, continues to be eyed for additional development, despite opposition. The 65-acre space (26 ha) was originally bought by the city in the 1990s with money raised "by the sale of bonds approved by voters with the purpose of acquiring more open space."

== See also ==
- Indigenous peoples of California
- California mission clash of cultures

Other Native American villages in Orange County, California:

- Acjacheme
- Ahunx
- Alume
- Genga
- Hutuknga
- Lupukngna
- Moyongna
- Pajbenga
- Panhe
- Puhú
- Piwiva
- Totpavit
