= Acjacheme =

Indigenous settlement in California

Coordinates: 33.5032°N 117.6610°W

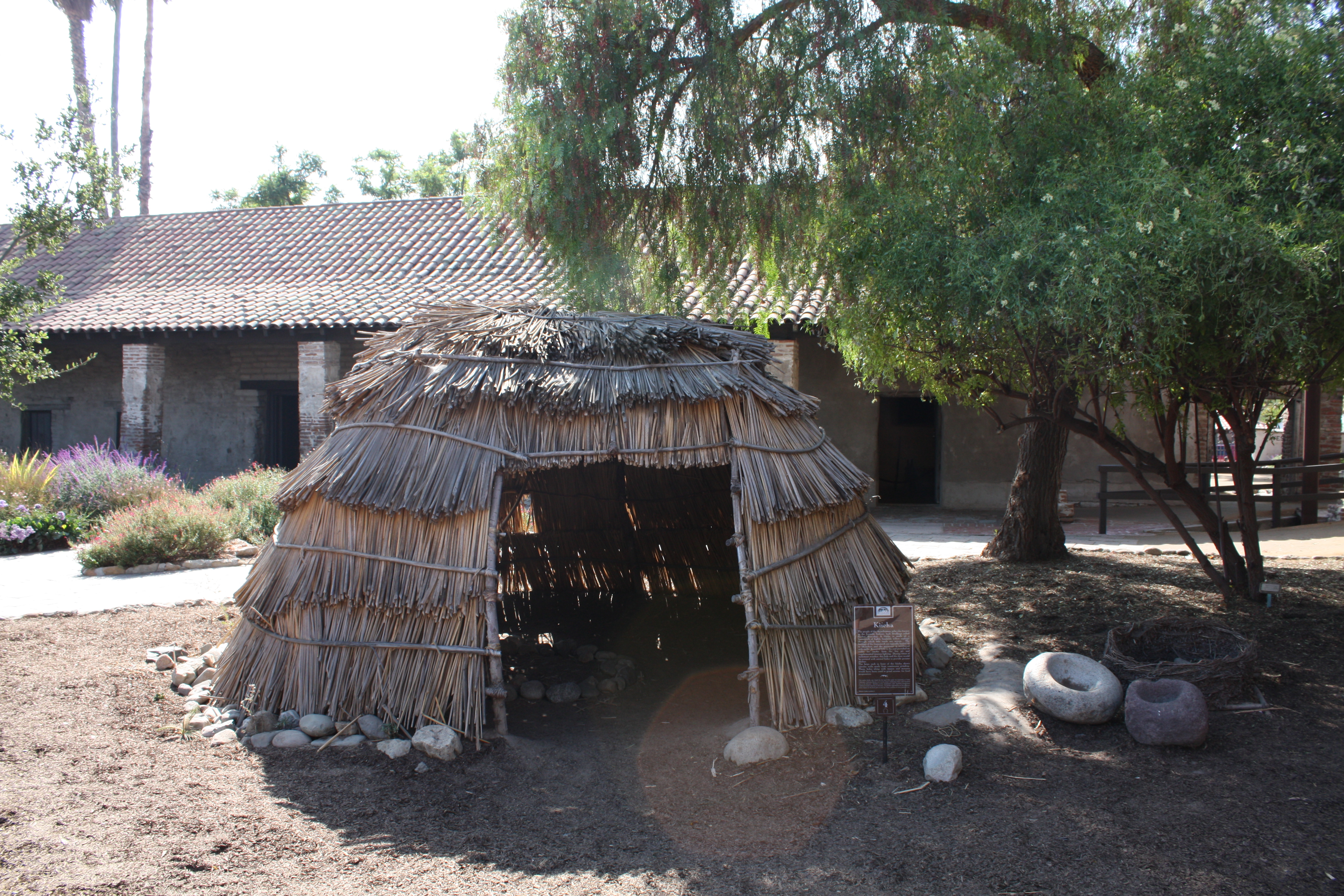
An Acjachemen dwelling replica located on the grounds of Mission San Juan Capistrano (Photo taken in 2008).

Acjacheme ("a heap of animated things") was an Acjachemen village that was closely situated to the mother village of Putuidem in what is now San Juan Capistrano, California. The Spanish missionaries constructed Mission San Juan Capistrano less than 60 yards from the village in 1776. Acjachemen is a pluralization of the word Acjacheme, and became the moniker for the people overall after the mission period.

The village has also been referred to as Akhachmai, Ahachmai, Akagchemem, Acágcheme, and Axatcme. The village site has been identified as being at an elementary school east of the Mission San Juan Capistrano by José de Grácia Cruz, who was one of the last native people born at the mission in the 1840s. Ahachmai has been referred to as a dialect or variety of the Acjachemen language and is used, although less commonly, to refer to the people as a whole.

== History ==
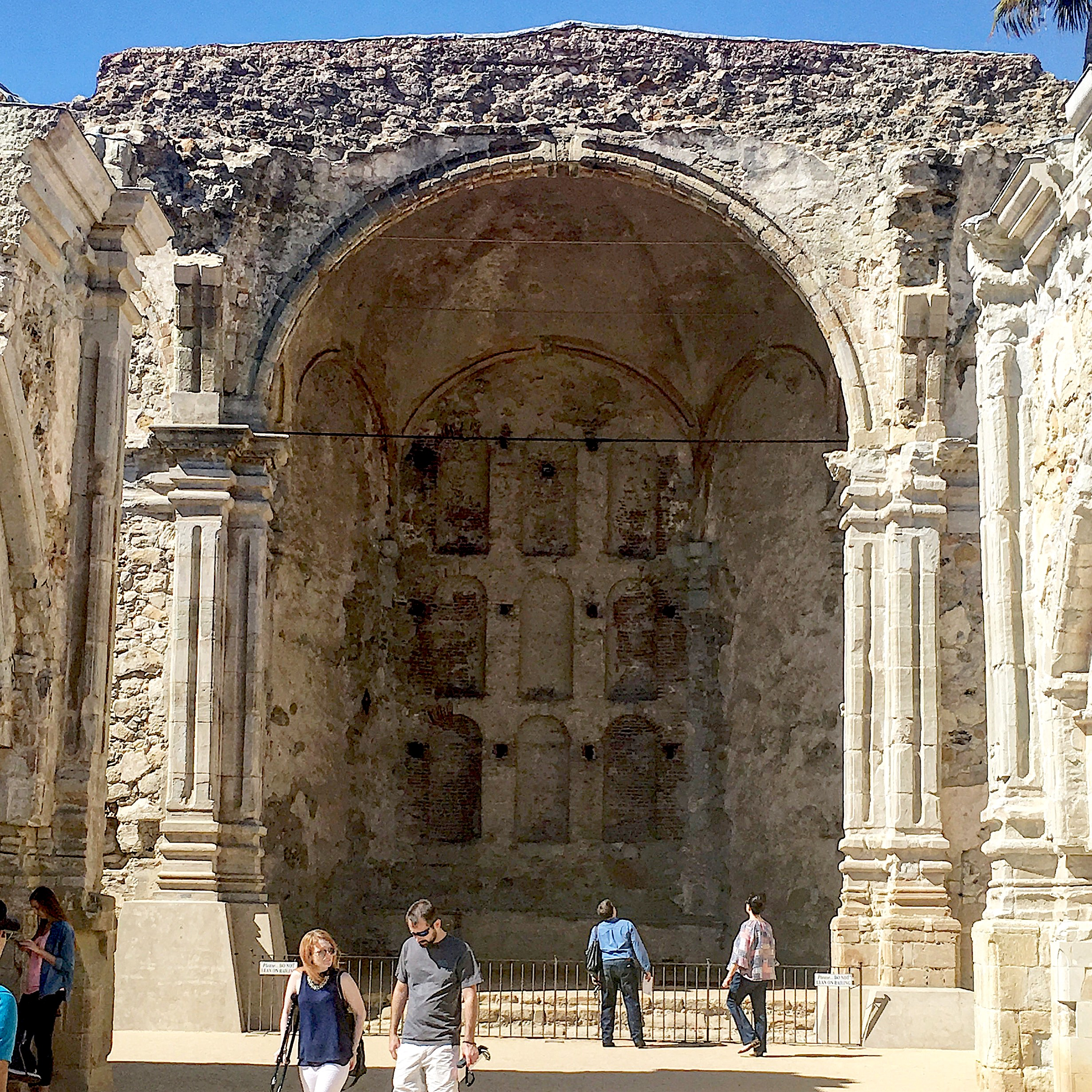
The ruins of the stone church that collapsed in the 1812 San Juan Capistrano earthquake. Thirty-nine Acjachemen people, thirty-one of whom were women, were killed.

Gerónimo Boscana noted that the village "was later ruled by a relative called Choqual," who also was the leader of Putuidem. The village here was referred to as Atoum-pumcaxque, which was the village of Ahachmai. Choqual was a relative of Chief Oyaison, who came from Sejat, and his daughter Coronne.

=== Colonial encounters ===
The Portolá expedition encountered the village in 1769. With the establishment of Mission San Juan Capistrano in 1778 next to the village, the mission was dependent on local villagers for labor.

Boscana, who was stationed at Mission San Juan Capistrano between 1814 and 1826, noted the following of the village:

...the Indians, on returning home, arrived and put up for the night at a place called Acagchemen, distant from where the mission now stands only about sixty yards. From this time, the new colony assumed the name corresponding to the place. Acagchemen signifies a pyramidal form of anything that moves, such as an anthill or place of resort for other insects.

=== Mission San Juan Capistrano ===
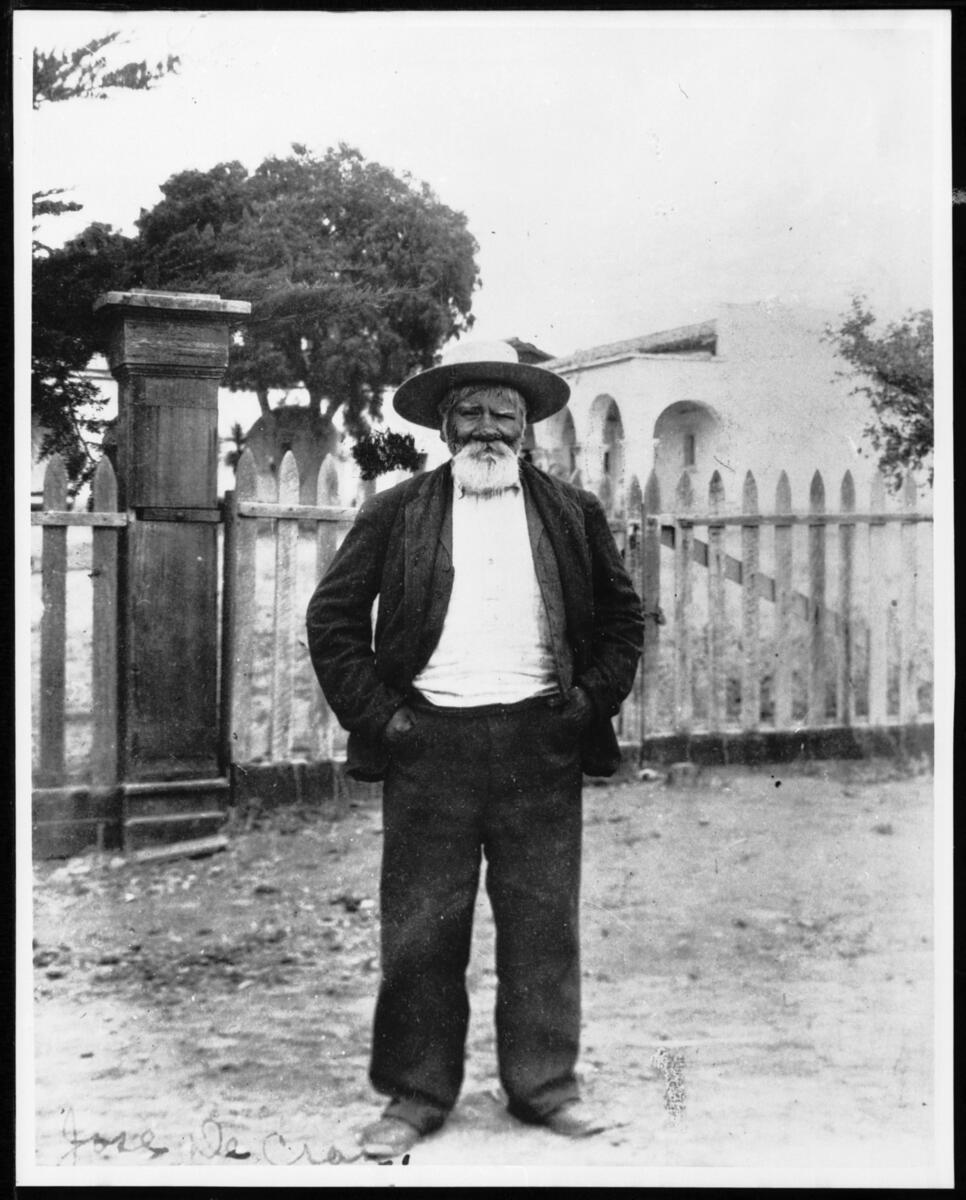
Portrait of José de Grácia Cruz, who was the bell ringer at San Juan Capistrano Mission (June 1909), who identified the site of the village. Source: University of Southern California. Libraries and California Historical Society.

The population of Acjacheme may have declined after the establishment of Mission San Juan Capistrano in 1776. Many of the villagers were likely converted to Christianity shortly after the mission's founding. By 1810, there were 1,138 native converts at the mission. The San Juan Capistrano earthquake of 1812 collapsed a stone church built by "neophytes," with most of the casualties being Acjachemen women, likely from nearby villages.

By the time of the secularization of the mission in 1833, 4,317 Acjachemen and other native people had been baptized at the mission (1,689 adults and 2,628 children). The number of deaths at the mission was 3,158—probably mostly Acjachemen. Those who survived living at the mission often settled in the surrounding area afterward, possibly including Acjacheme.

=== Further identification ===
José de Gracia Cruz who was one of the last native people from Mission San Juan Capistrano (born in the 1840s), identified the village site as being at an elementary school east of the mission.

In 1980, some artifacts on the school grounds were still being found by native people, including "a fire pit or ring, some stone artifacts, and a quantity of shell." Two authors of a 1980 study stated that this site was, as a result, in need of more archaeological investigation.

== Popular culture ==
Eleanor Coerr's The Bell Ringer and the Pirates (1983) narrativizes the story of the attack on San Juan Capistrano by a group of pirates led by the French Hippolyte de Bouchard in 1818, with characters from Ahachmai. The book follows eight-year-old boy Pio from the village, who warns his family and friends of the attack.

== See also ==
- Indigenous peoples of California

Native American villages in Orange County, California:

- Acjacheme
- Ahunx
- Alauna
- Genga
- Hutuknga
- Lupukngna
- Moyongna
- Pajbenga
- Panhe
- Puhú
- Piwiva
- Sejat
- Totpavit

Sites of other Spanish colonial missions in adjacent Native homelands:

- Achooykomenga (the site of Mission San Fernando)
- Toviscanga (the site of Mission San Gabriel)
- Yaanga (the site of Pueblo de Los Ángeles)
