= Lupukngna =

Former Tongva village in Huntington Beach, California

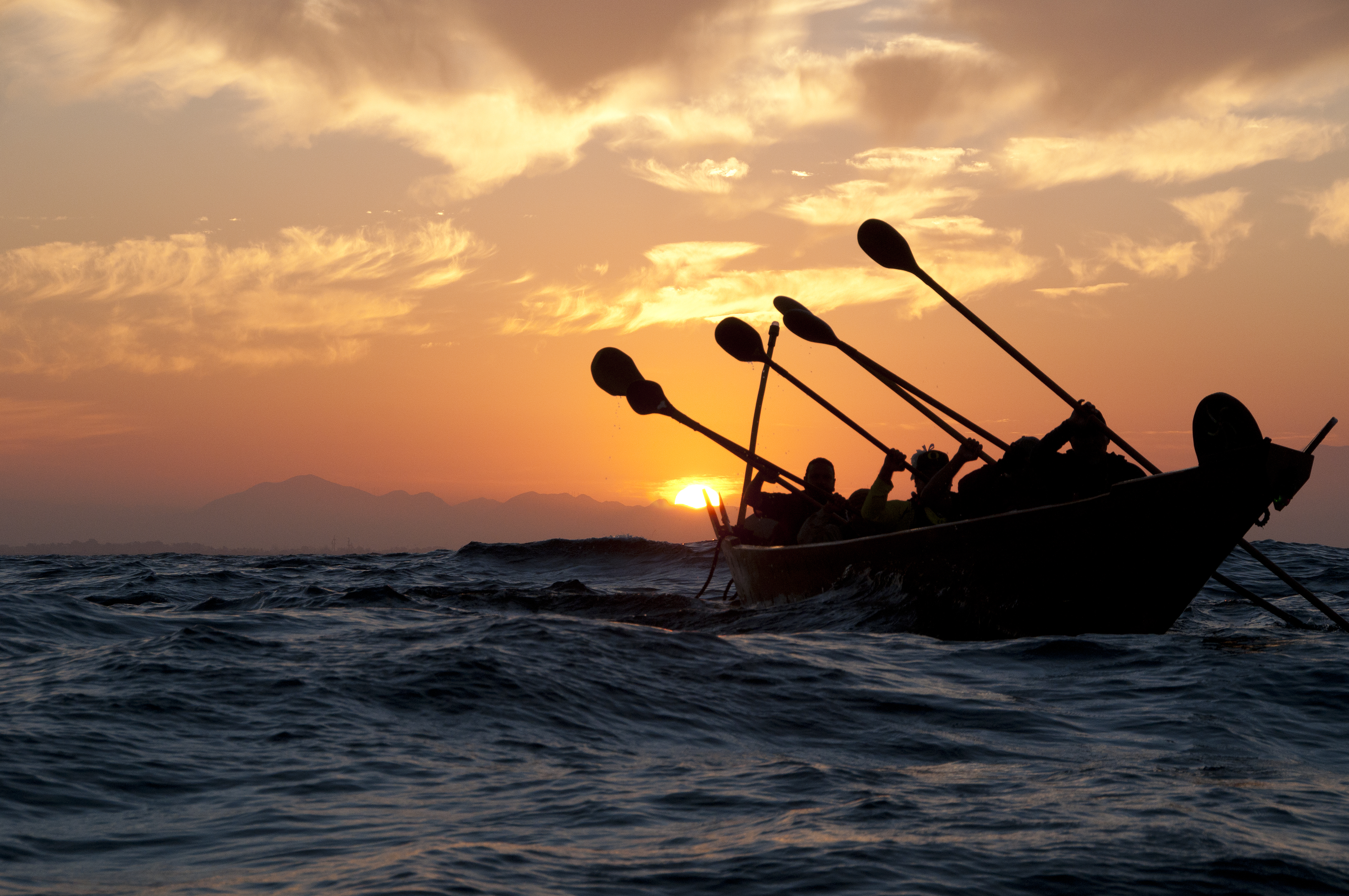
As a coastal site, villagers likely used te'aats (pictured) to navigate the coastline.

Lupukngna was a coastal Tongva village that was at least 3,000 years old located on the bluffs along the Santa Ana River in Huntington Beach near the Newland House Museum. Other nearby coastal villages included Genga, located in West Newport Beach, and Moyongna, located down the coast near Corona del Mar. The village has also been referred to as Lukup and Lukupa. The village has been chronicled in the history of Costa Mesa, California.

== History ==
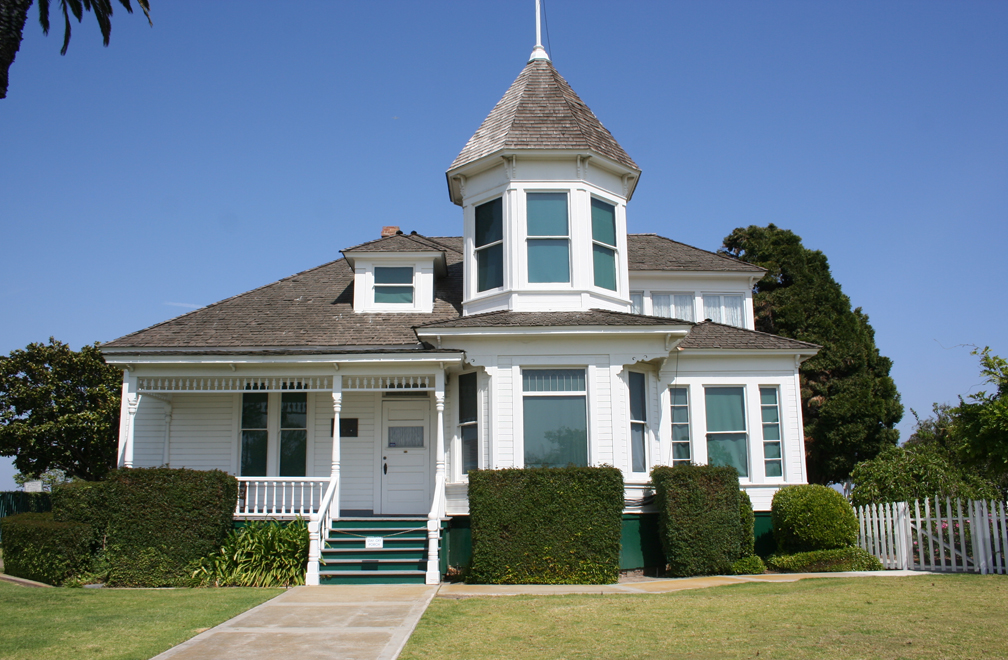
Lupukngna has been located at the Newland House in Huntington Beach (photo taken in 2009).

As a coastal village, the usage of te'aats were likely important to the village's people. In the late eighteenth century, padres from Mission San Juan Capistrano reportedly visited the village as part of a colonial project of Christian conversion at Spanish Missions in California.

The Diego Sepúlveda Adobe was built overlooking Lupukngna and Genga from between 1817 and 1823 as an outpost "to watch over cattle and Indians." In 1827, missionaries considered whether to move their entire operation to the location.

In 1935, archaeologists found evidence of a village along the Santa Ana River near contemporary Adams Avenue. It was found that villagers primarily subsisted on acorns, seeds, berries, small game, fish and shellfish, similar to surrounding Tongva villages. Shell mounds were also found.

The Newland House Museum was identified as a likely site of the village. This is because the house was constructed on one of a few knolls in the area that rises above the Santa Ana River's floodplain. Numerous Tongva villages in the area were established on other similar knolls, making the location more probable. Additionally, several archaeological investigations have been done at the house since the 1930s, which have yielded various Tongva artifacts.

A small residential street in Costa Mesa near the Diego Sepúlveda Adobe is named Lukup Lane in reference to the village.

== See also ==
Other Native American villages in Orange County, California:

- Acjacheme
- Ahunx
- Alume
- Genga
- Hutuknga
- Moyongna
- Pajbenga
- Piwiva
- Puhú
- Putiidhem
- Totpavit
