= Hutuknga =

Former Tongva village in Yorba Linda, California

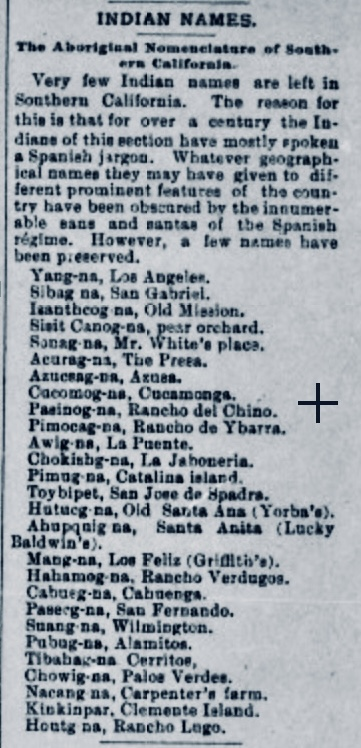
Hutuknga, spelled Hutucg-na, listed as being located in Old Santa Ana (Yorba's) in an early mention of the village's name in the Los Angeles Herald in 1893.

Hutuknga (alternative spellings: Hotuuknga or Hutuukuga) was a large Tongva village located in the foothills along the present channel of the Santa Ana River in what is now Yorba Linda, California. People from the village were recorded in mission records as Jutucabit. Hutuknga was part of a series of villages along the Santa Ana River, which included Lupukngna, Genga, Pajbenga, and Totpavit. The Turnball Canyon area is sometimes falsely associated with Hutuknga.

== Village life ==
The village may have had a population of about 250 at the time of contact, and has been described as one of the largest Tongva villages. It was linked to the downstream village of Genga through marriage ties.

It is likely that villagers primarily subsisted on oak trees for acorns and seeds from various grasses and sage bushes. Rabbit and mule deer were likely consumed for meat. Like other surrounding villages, it likely had deep trade connections with coastal villages and those further inland.

== History ==
The Portolá expedition (1769–1770) may have come into contact with the village, in which a recount of the encounter recalled that residents brought gifts of food to the Spaniards. The chief then made a speech. Friar Juan Crespí noted "they are all very well-behaved tractable folk, who seem somewhat lean – though the men very strongly built – and food must be in short supply with them."

People from the village were primarily baptized at Mission San Gabriel as part of a larger colonial project of Christian conversion of Indigenous peoples at Spanish missions in California. One of the earliest converts at the mission was a boy from the village, who was converted in 1772. 240 people from Hutuknga were baptized in at Mission San Gabriel from between 1773 and 1790. It was recorded in San Gabriel mission records as a large village, along with Totabit, Pasinonga, and Wapijangna.

== See also ==
Native American villages in Orange County, California:

- Acjacheme
- Ahunx
- Alauna
- Genga
- Lupukngna
- Moyongna
- Pajbenga
- Piwiva
- Puhú
- Putiidhem
- Totpavit
