= Newland House =

Historic house in California, United States

- U.S. National Register of Historic Places
- U.S. National Historic Landmark
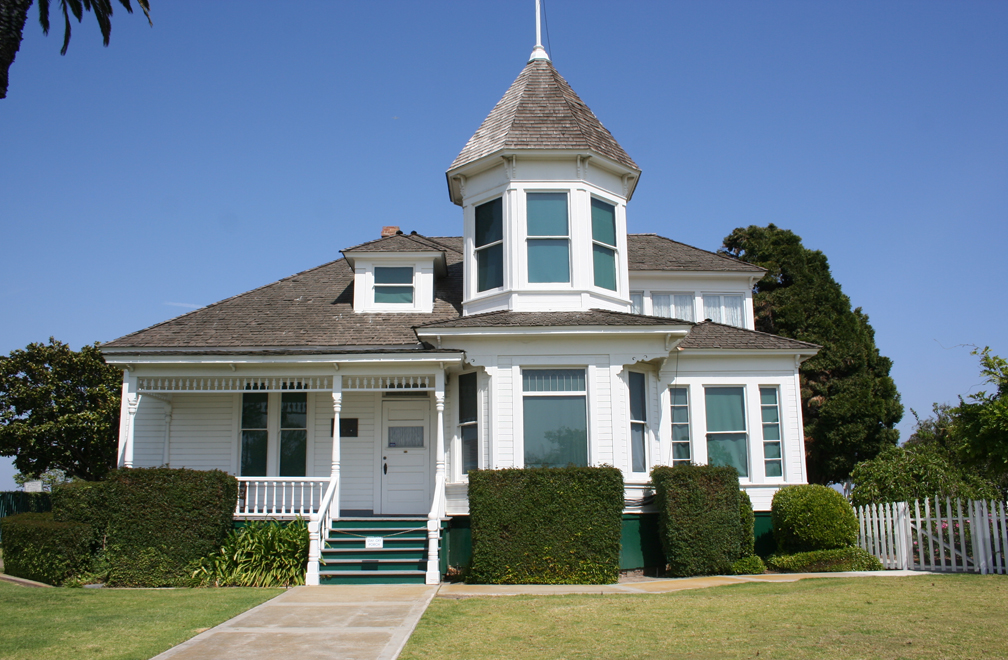

- Location within California
- Location: 19820 Beach Boulevard, Huntington Beach, California
- Coordinates: 33°40′35″N 117°59′14″W
- Built: 1898
- Architect: Dawes & Kuechel
- Architectural style: Queen Anne style
- NRHP reference No.: 85003374
- Added to NRHP: 24 October 1985

Newland House is an 1898 farmhouse in a midwestern adaptation of a Queen Anne architectural style in Huntington Beach, California, United States. Listed on the National Register of Historic Places, it is one of 123 historic places and districts on the National Register of Historic Places in Orange County, California. The Newland House is listed as the ninth historic place to receive a historical plaque from the Orange County Historical Commission in cooperation with the Orange County Board of Supervisors. The house has been identified as the site of the Tongva village of Lupukngna.

== Newland House Museum ==
The Newland House Museum is located at 19820 Beach Boulevard in Huntington Beach, California, 92648 (33°40′35″N 117°59′14″W), and is managed by the Huntington Beach Historical Society. Constructed in 1898 by William Taylor Newland and Mary Juanita DeLapp Newland, it was listed on the National Register of Historic Places in 1985 and is a historical pioneer museum. The house was built by Dawes & Kuechel of Santa Ana, California. One of the first homes constructed in the area, lumber for its construction was transported from McFadden's Wharf in Newport Beach, California, by horse-drawn wagon. The gravel for the cement foundation was hauled from the beach at what is now Huntington Beach.

The Newland ranch contained vegetable gardens, orchards, a variety of farm animals, and pet peacocks; it covered more than 500 acres of land. Celery and sugar beets were the main product of the ranch's gardens, though other crops were also grown. The outbuildings contained a large barn, stables, corrals and bunkhouses for ranch hands. During the early years, water was obtained from a natural spring near the present day intersection of Adams Avenue and Beach Boulevard. William Newland later developed a water well closer to the Newland House and constructed a water tower. The water tower was reproduced in the 21st Century by the Huntington Beach Historical Society in the back yard of the Newland House. The Tongva village of Lupukngna has been identified as the site where the house was constructed, with artifacts from the village being subsequently found on the grounds.

The property came under the control of the Signal Oil & Gas after Mary Juanita Newland's death in 1952. Signal Oil used the home for workers for approximately 20 years. Signal Oil originally planned to use the property for an oil refinery, but later dropped those plans due to community objections. Signal Oil formed the Signal Landmark development company and began planning for a commercial shopping center on the former Newland Rancho. A community effort to preserve the Newland House as a local landmark and museum initiated in 1964. In 1974, Signal Landmark Homes donated the Newland House and associated land to the City of Huntington Beach for a historic park.

A community-based historic preservation group organized with leadership from the Huntington Beach Junior Women's Club in 1976. The Newland House first opened for public tours in 1978. The historic preservation project was supported financially by the City of Huntington Beach in 1983, investing in the construction of the Newland Barn to provide event space. The Huntington Beach Historical Society continues to work cooperatively with the City of Huntington Beach regarding use of the property, ongoing maintenance, and community events.

In 1998, the Newland House marked its 100-year anniversary. The Huntington Beach Historical Society attempted to obtain the Native Californian basketry collection of Mary Juanita Newland, lent to the Bowers Museum in Santa Ana, California, in 1935. A variety of prehistoric stone artifacts, such as mortars and pestles, were unearthed in 1898 during construction of the house, built on the site of a Native American settlement. A majority of those artifacts reportedly also are in the Bowers Museum collection. The dispute was not resolved and the Mary Juanita Newland collection, as well as artifacts unearthed at the Newland Rancho in the late 19th and early 20th centuries, remain in the collection of the Bowers Museum.

== William Taylor and Mary Juanita DeLapp Newland ==
William Taylor Newland was born in Camp Point, Illinois, in October 1850. He was one of the developers involved in the sale of the first lots at Huntington Beach. William Taylor Newland was eleven years of age when his father, John Newland, enlisted for service in the Civil War in 1862. His father was killed in Little Rock, Arkansas, in 1865. His mother died in 1869, leaving him orphaned at age 19. He went to work on the farm of John M. DeLapp, whose daughter, Mary Juanita DeLapp, he married six years later.

A biographical account of William Taylor Newland in 1933 noted,

He wrested much of the fine Newland Ranch from the tulle swamps and drained and cultivated the land for nearly half a century. Before draining “Gospel Swamp,” Mr. Newland came near to being drowned within a few rods of his own house. Three years prior to his death he leased his entire farm, spending the remainder of his life in well earned retirement. He joined in the promotion of the beet sugar plant at the beach city, the establishment of the railroads and beet dumps. Later he was the chief financial backer of the linoleum plant, now converted into a profitable producing oil lease. Up to the day of his death he was active in public affairs. His good judgment and sound doctrines led to the seeking of his counsel in almost every public project of unusual importance, according to his friends. He was always active in politics and took a keen interest in all civic movements. He was one of the most popular men in the city, loved by all classes.

Mary Juanita DeLapp was born in Jacksonville, Illinois, in 1859, and was married to William Taylor Newland in 1875. She served on the local school board for sixteen years, founding the Huntington Beach Township's first parent-teacher organization in 1908. She was a charter member of the Huntington Beach Woman's Club and in 1939 was named "Woman of the Year" in recognition of her community service.

The Newlands moved from Illinois to California during the land boom of the 1880s. William purchased five-hundred acres of the former Rancho La Bolsa Chica in 1897, paying carpenters $2.50 per day to clear the land and begin construction of the Newlands' home. The Newlands moved into their home in the summer of 1898.

William Newland died of a heart attack on his ranch in 1933 at age 83. Mary Juanita DeLapp Newland continued to live in the home until her death in 1952, at the age of ninety-three. Ten Newland children were raised in the house and two born in the house.

== Huntington Beach Historical Society ==
The Huntington Beach Historical Society is responsible for the maintenance and improvements of the Newland House Museum. The Huntington Beach Historical Society's mission is to protect local history, and to promote and facilitate historical education and awareness. The Society annually awards the Order of the Newland Rose to honor a person who has been active in preserving heritage of Huntington Beach.

The Huntington Beach Historical Society organizes several annual events, including The Revolution, in Huntington Beach Central Park, an American Revolution reenactment; Civil War Days, an American Civil War reenactment in Huntington Beach Central Park, an annual joint event with the Historic Wintersburg Preservation Task Force, Holidays in Huntington Beach, an event that each year turns back the clock to reenact community holiday celebrations of 100 years ago.

The 2022 Board of Directors for the Huntington Beach Historical Society are President, Kelly Rivers; Vice President, Darrell Rivers; 2nd Vice President, Patrick Kreeger; Recording Secretary, David Kerner; Treasurer, Cindy Carr.
