= Puhú =

Historical native American village in California, US

Coordinates: 33.8025°N 117.6558°W

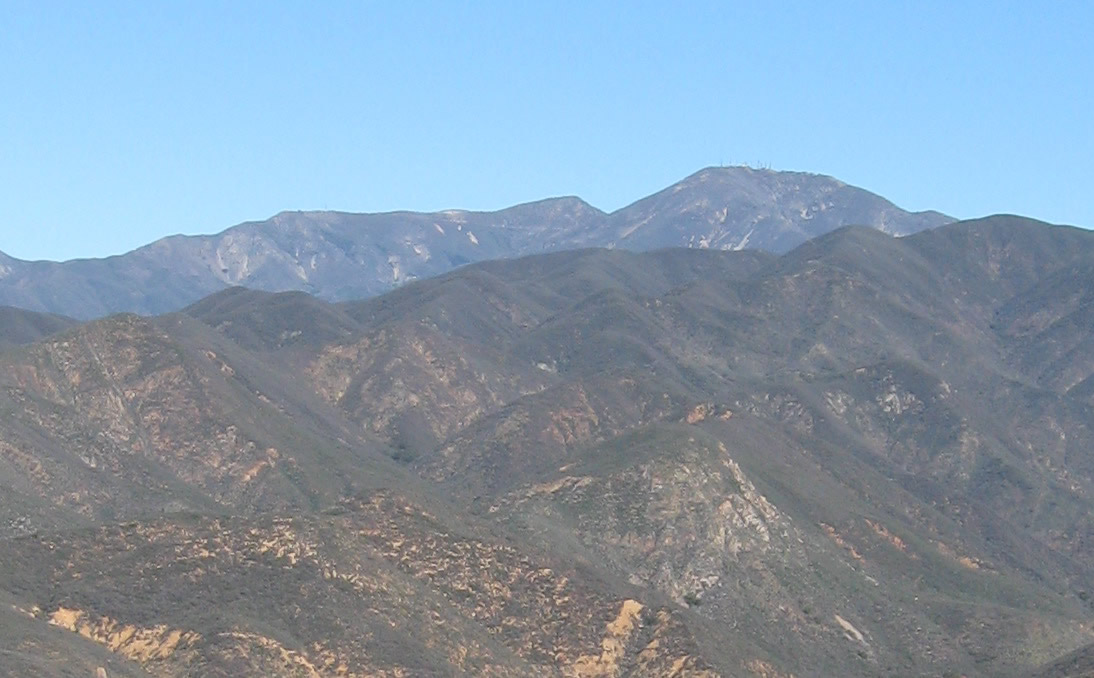
The village was located in the area of Santiago Peak in the Santa Ana Mountains.

Puhú (Payómkawichum: “its arrow place”) was a major residential village in the Santa Ana Mountains shared by the Tongva, Acjachemen, Payómkawichum, and Serrano near Santiago Peak. The village resided approximately 600m above sea level in the upper areas of the Black Star Canyon. The village was at its height from the years 1220–1770. The village retained its multi-seasonal occupancy and economic and political systems up until its destruction and a communal massacre in 1832.

The Puhú site is listed as a California Historical Landmark as the Black Star Canyon Indian Village Site, registered in 1935 and named after the Black Star Coal Mining Company that operated in the area in the late nineteenth century. The village site is north of the town of Silverado.

== Village life ==
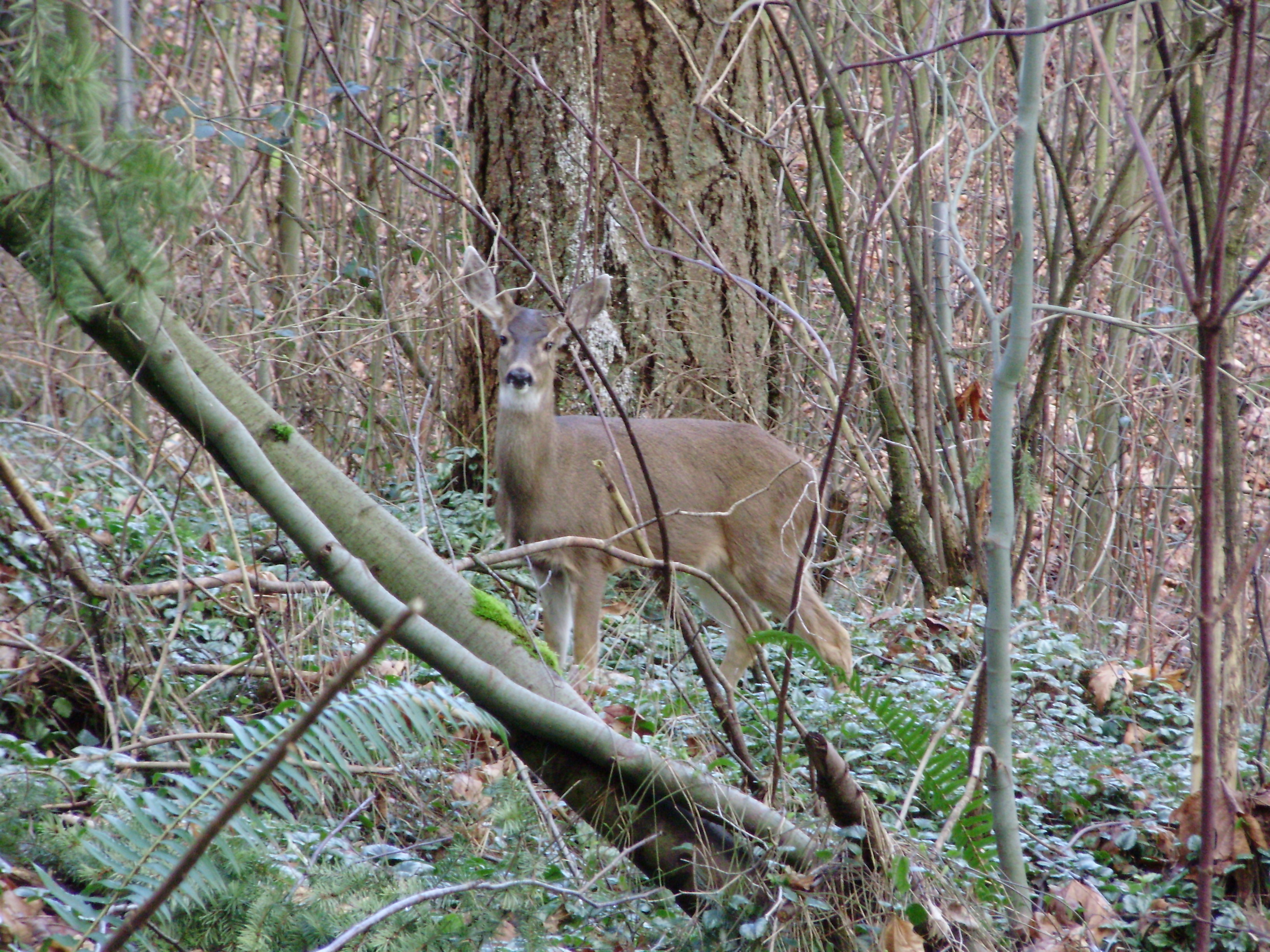
Mule deer were likely an important food source for the village.

Several archaeological excavations of Puhú were conducted from the 1930s onward and found that it featured "17 bedrock milling/rock art features surrounding a single mounded habitation midden." The nearby Tongva village of Pamajam was located near Puhú in a meadow in a small valley with a body of water and marsh, or cinega, with a view of the Channel Islands. San Gabriel Mission records referred to Christian converts of this village as Pamaibit, which was derived from the word pa'ajvar, meaning "above." This village was located near what is now referred to as Corona, California.

For meat supply, the village primarily subsisted on mule deer. Other animals, such as bears, ravens, and mountain lions were not consumed, likely because of their position as "animal ancestors/deities within Chinigchinich religion." Shell ornaments were likely an important crafting resource for the village. The village had trade connections with the San Joaquin Valley, Great Basin, and Colorado River regions.

== Destruction ==
By 1810, the village was becoming closer to private ranch allotments, such as Rancho Santiago de Santa Ana, given out by Spanish colonial authorities.

After a claim that the village residents had stolen horses and other livestock (cattle, sheep, goats, pigs) for a period of several months to subsist on due to alleged food shortages in 1832, the village was massacred by American and Mexican fur trappers, led by William Wolfskill.

In a recount of the event, it was claimed that "the Indians were very fond of horseflesh" and that they were "feasting on juicy horseflesh" at the time of the raid on the village. According to the account, only a few villagers survived the raid by escape.

== Memorialization ==
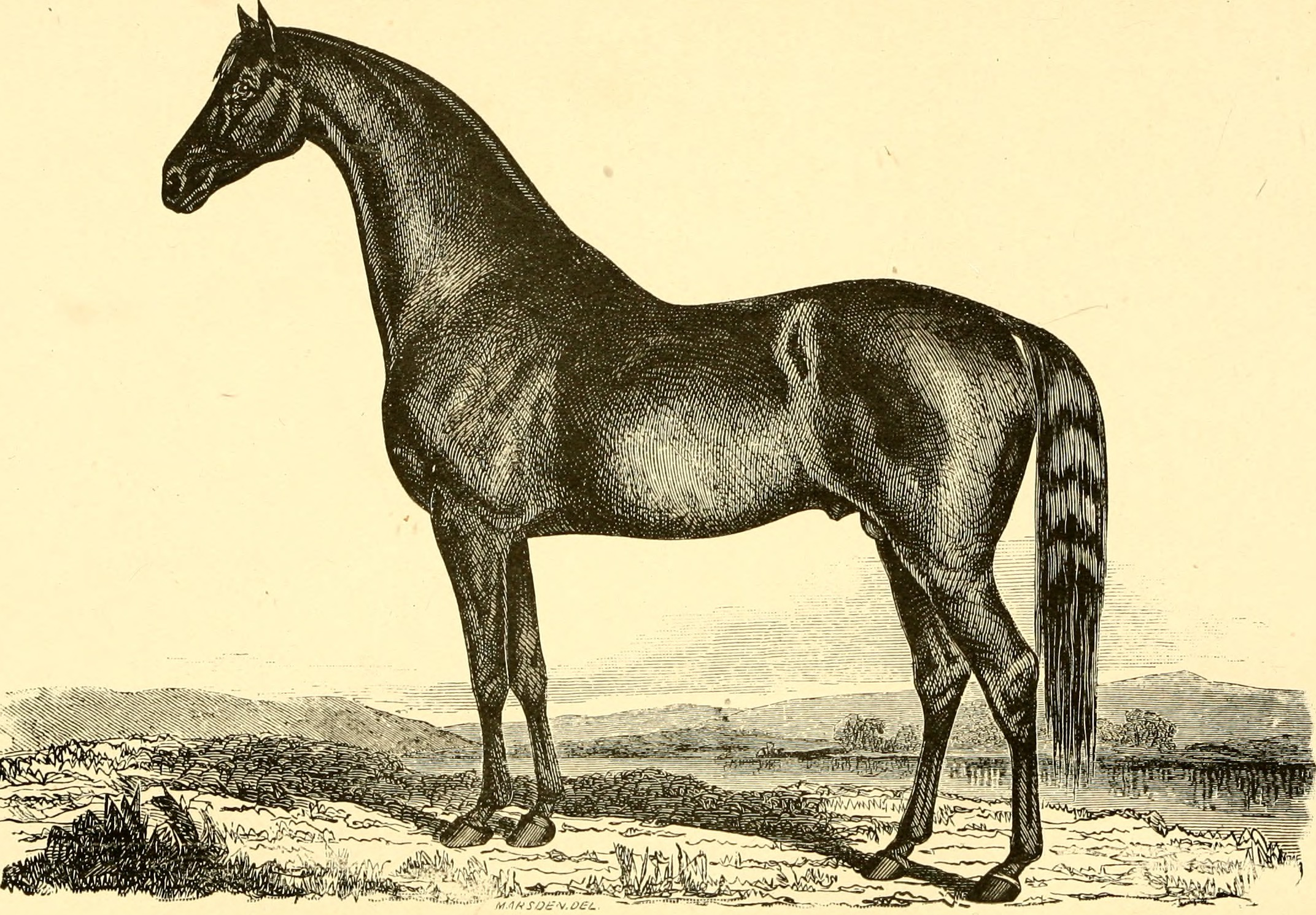
Authorities claimed that villagers were feasting on horse flesh, a common trope used by the Spanish in Alta California of native people.

After a publication of the story in 1931, the story of the massacre became part of Orange County folklore and textual history.

As a result, this memorialization urged interest in excavation of the area. From 1936 to 1937, the village site was poorly excavated by the Works Progress Administration (WPA), which took 200 kg of artifacts from the site without cataloguing or analyzing them. The artifacts were spread throughout various museums, while others were cast off as too fragmented to preserve or study. The WPA mischaracterized the village as a small hunting and acorn-processing camp, rather than a large village.

The narrative of the villagers memorialized has since been critiqued based on in-depth research, both in relation to the size of the village and the activities of the villagers. The claim that villagers were consuming horse flesh has been identified as a common trope promoted by Spanish colonial authorities, particularly in the Alta California region. Scientific analysis of the village's midden in 2021 found that no horse or European livestock remains were present.

== See also ==
Native American villages in Orange County, California:

- Acjacheme
- Ahunx
- Alauna
- Genga
- Hutuknga
- Lupukngna
- Moyongna
- Pajbenga
- Piwiva
- Putiidhem
- Totpavit
