= Alume =

Former Acjachemen village in California

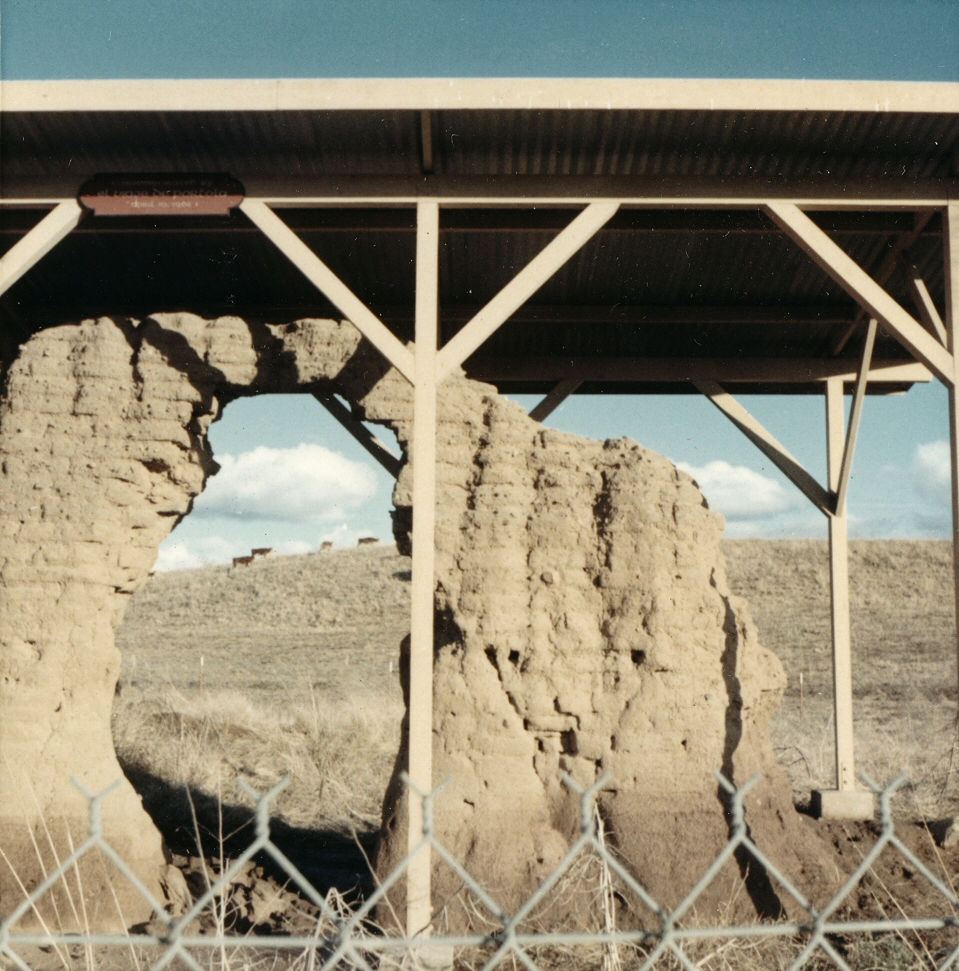
Trabuco Adobe, Rancho Santa Margarita (Nov 1967). Photo courtesy Orange County Archives.

Alume (Acjachemen: "raising the head in looking upward") was a large Acjachemen village located at the foot of Santiago Peak, upstream from the village of Putiidhem, within what is now O'Neill Regional Park near the Trabuco Adobe, which was built in 1810 as an outpost of Mission San Juan Capistrano. The village was also recorded as Alaugna and as El Trabuco in San Juan Capistrano mission records, and is also referred to as Alauna, Aluna, and Alona. The village was also acknowledged by the Payómkawichum.

== History ==
A map of a Acjachemen villages. The village is recorded here as Alume.

On July 24–25, 1769, the Portolá expedition passed by the village. Juan Crespí noted that "there is a stream in this hollow [Trabuco Creek] with the finest and purest running water we have come upon so far," further writing "we made camp close to a village of the most tractable and friendly heathens we have seen upon the whole way; as soon as we arrived they all came over weaponless to our camp... and have stayed almost the whole day long with us."

60 people from the village were baptized as part of the colonial project Christian conversion of Indigenous peoples at Spanish missions in California between 1777 and 1787.

Tecla María Huinauhuegen of Zoucche Tecla María Huinauhuegen, who was the seventh person baptized at San Juan Capistrano when she was fourteen years old in April 1779 was the daughter of a man named Chaquel. In 1780, she would go on to marry José Ygnacio Paichi of Tobani from Doheny Beach in August. Only one child of this couple would go on to reach adulthood. This was common during the mission period as a result of colonialism, where, for example, a missionary during this period recorded that three out of four children died at Mission San Gabriel before reaching the age of two. This child was recorded as Manuel Romano in San Juan Capistrano mission records, who married Antonina Ayanequit of the village of Alauna in 1801.

In 1810, the Trabuco Adobe was constructed near the village site as an outpost of San Juan Capistrano. Similar to other Acjachemen villages, Alume likely became depleted by the expansion of Mission San Juan Capistrano. In 1810, the mission already had a native or "neophyte" population of 1,136. By 1833 over 4,317 native people (1,689 adults and 2,628 children), largely from surrounding Acjachemen villages, had been baptized at the mission. That same year it was recorded that 3,158 had died in that same period, indicating the disastrous effects of the mission system on native people's lives.

== See also ==
Native American villages in Orange County, California:

- Acjacheme
- Ahunx
- Genga
- Hutukgna
- Lupukngna
- Moyongna
- Pajbenga
- Piwiva
- Puhú
- Putiidhem
- Totpavit
