= Yaanga =

Former Tongva village in Los Angeles, California

Coordinates: 34°03′15″N 118°14′17″W

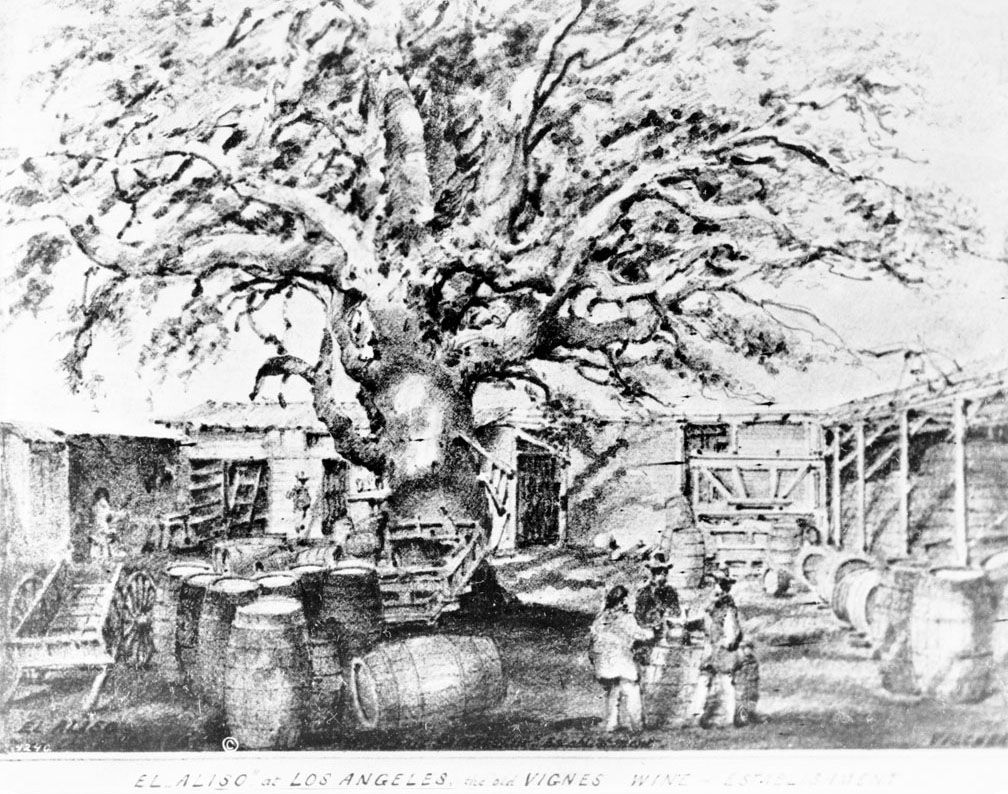
A large sycamore tree, referred to as El Aliso by the Spanish, stood at the center of the village of Yaanga in the mid-18th century and was an important landmark for the Tongva.

Yaanga was a large Tongva (or Kizh) village, originally located near what is now downtown Los Angeles, just west of the Los Angeles River and beneath U.S. Route 101. People from the village were recorded as Yabit in missionary records although they were known as Yaangavit, Yavitam, or Yavitem among the people. It is unclear what the exact population of Yaanga was prior to colonization, although it was recorded as the largest and most influential village in the region.

Yaangavit were treated as slave laborers during the Mission period by Franciscan padres to construct and work at San Gabriel Mission and Nuestra Señora Reina de los Ángeles Asistencia and forced laborers for the Spanish, Mexican, and American settlers to construct and expand Los Angeles. The colonizers' dependency on Yaanga for forced labor is thought to be a reason for its ability to survive longer than most Indigenous villages in the region. However, after the founding of Pueblo de Los Ángeles in 1781, Yaanga increasingly "began to look more like a refugee camp than a traditional community," and following relentless pressure on the inhabitants to assimilate, the community was eventually dispersed.

The original village seems to have only remained intact until about 1813. After being forcibly relocated several times, eventually eastward across the Los Angeles River, it was razed to the ground by the Los Angeles City Council under American occupation in 1847. Buried intact deposits from Yaanga have been found throughout downtown Los Angeles, such as in the vicinity of Alameda Street, Bella Union Hotel, Union Station, Plaza Church, and the Metropolitan Water District Headquarters.

== Etymology ==
Yaanga (alternative spellings: Yangna or iyáangaʼ, written as "Yang-Na" in Spanish), was described in contemporary sources as being a Tongva word meaning "place of the poison oak."

== Location ==
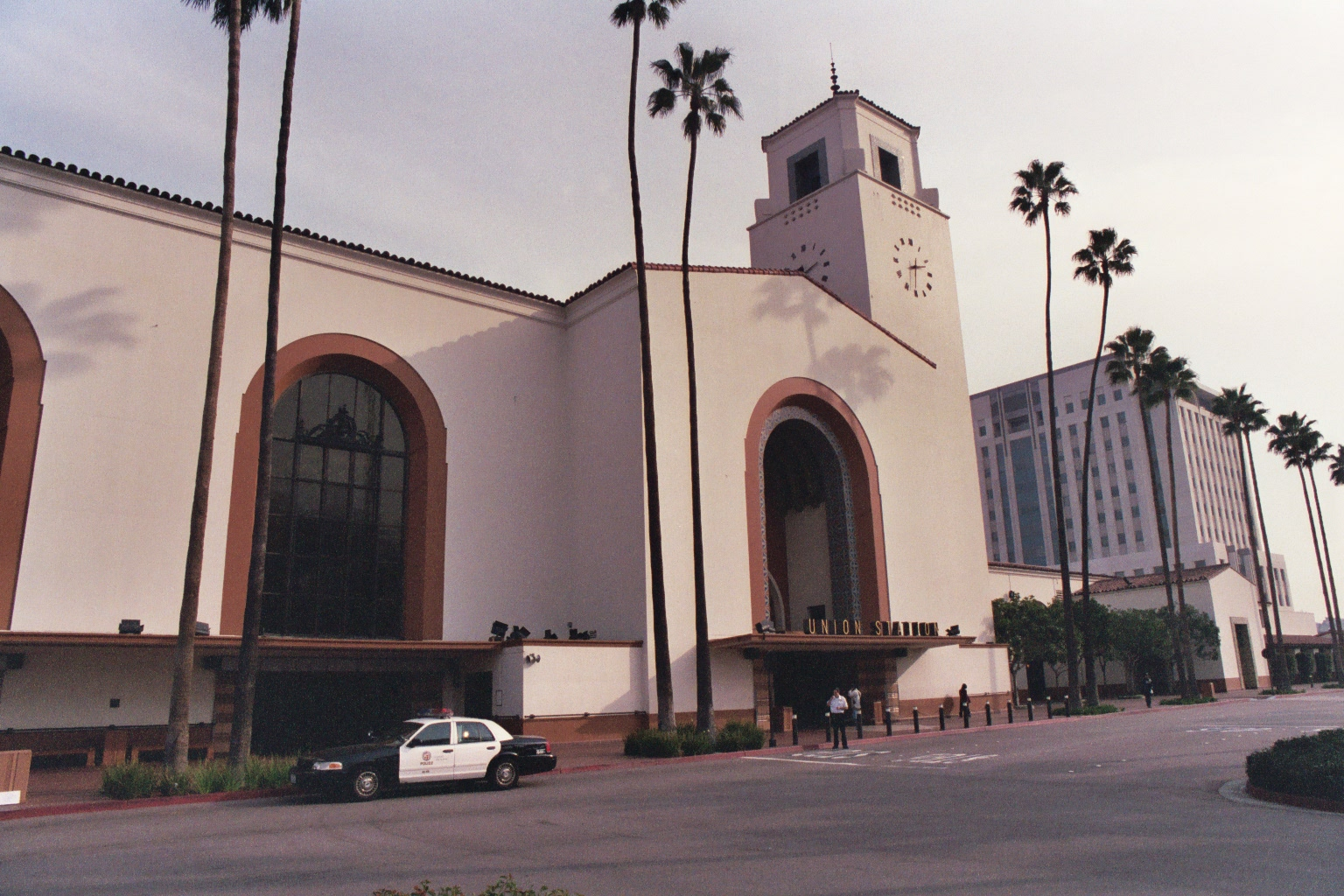
Archaeological remains associated with Yaanga were unearthed during the construction of Union Station.

The original exact site of Yaanga is unclear because the village was evicted, forcibly relocated, destroyed and is now covered by downtown Los Angeles. However, it is known to have existed near downtown Los Angeles, just west of the Los Angeles River, and beneath U.S. Route 101. One article located the original village site of Yaanga "about 1.4 miles southwest of the current N. Broadway Street at the Los Angeles River [and] in the neighborhood of Los Angeles Street between the current Plaza south towards Temple Street... [which] would have placed the village in close proximity to the pueblo’s earliest plaza and church. The [Los Angeles] pueblo was established immediately adjacent to Yaanga in 1781 in the area north of the current Los Angeles Plaza Church."

Some historians position Yaanga as located slightly south of Los Angeles Plaza (Los Angeles Plaza Park), near or underneath where the Bella Union Hotel was located (now Fletcher Bowron Square). One historian concludes that "it is highly unlikely that Yaanga would have been located east of the present course of Alameda Street (i.e. beneath Union Station) because these areas would have periodically scoured during flood stages of the Los Angeles River, and higher, drier ground could be found farther west."

Several records within the English translations of the early era ayuntamiento or village council held relate that the council formally apportioned a triangular site for use by the Yaanga natives for their village, as well as subsequent attempts by Juan Domingo against this village. The former record indicates that the triangular site apparently was a portion of the Second Settlement Plaza which possibly had been cut through by the historic flood of 1815. The date upon which the site was dedicated for use by Tongva natives is not given in the council translations, but the apportionment took place within fifteen years following the 1825 flood. More than one history of Los Angeles makes claims that in the westward shift of the river in the flood of 1815, the river destroyed both the Natives' village as well as the recently established second pueblo settlement, including the pueblo chapel. The plaza of the second pueblo settlement was located on the north side of Aliso Street a short distance west of El AliSo, the aged totem/signal tree of the Tongva Nation. The river continued to flow westward to Ballona Flats for a ten-year period which lasted until the great flood of spring 1825. The river shifted eastward and cut against the hillside beyond/above which Boyle Heights eventually was settled. The now-empty riverbed of the ten year interregnum was utilized to form a northern passage by which the citizens could easily ford the river north of the juncture of the creek which still combines the drainages of Arroyo de Los Posas and Canada de Los Abilas within the broad valley north of present Boyle Heights.

The triangular site of 'Yaanga' was the remainder of the southeast portion of the plaza of the second settlement. The juncture of the original Aliso Street with the new route to the northeast, which followed the empty riverbed, was at the second settlement plaza. The reason why pueblo inhabitants abandoned the first settlement site to the northwest may have been due to destruction and fear resulting from two great earthquakes that occurred ten days apart in December 1812. The third (present) site of the Los Angeles Pueblo was then arrived at following the flood of 1815.

=== Excavations ===
In 1962, Bernice Johnston noted that "...some characteristic items were unearthed during the building of Union Station in 1939, and considerably more... when the historic Bella Union Hotel was built [1870] [between Main and Los Angeles streets north of Commercial]."

In 1992, Joan Brown indicated archaeological materials were found in the vicinity of Union Station:

Previous archaeological studies conducted at and near Union Station indicate that buried intact prehistoric and historic deposits exist in-situ beneath and in the vicinity of Union Station. The extent of the archaeological deposits is unknown at this time. Union Station was constructed on three to twenty feet of fill dirt placed over the original Los Angeles Chinatown. Chinatown, in turn, had been built over the remains of an Indian village, tentatively identified as the village of Yangna.

Excavations at the Metropolitan Water District Headquarters in 1999 revealed "a protohistoric cemetery associated with Yabit." It has been reported that excavations near the Plaza Church have "recovered beads and other artifacts used during the period of mission recruitment."

== History ==
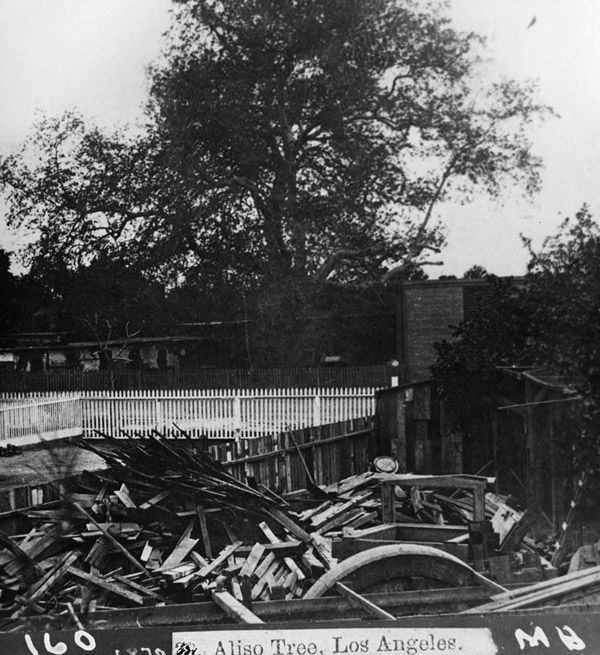
The El Aliso' tree (pictured here in 1870) first sprouted in the late fifteenth century and by the mid-eighteenth century was located at the center of Yaanga.

=== Before the mission period ===
Yaanga was recorded to be one of the most powerful villages in the region. The people who were from Yaanga referred to themselves as Yaangavit. People from the village were recorded as Yabit in missionary records although were known as Yaangavit, Yavitam, or Yavitem among the people.

At the center of the village was a large sycamore tree referred to by the Spanish and later settlers as El Aliso, which is believed to have started growing in the late fifteenth century as part of an extensive riparian forest that "thrived alongside the Los Angeles River and the region's inland wetlands" until around 1825, following a large flood which destroyed most of the trees (although El Aliso went on to survive until 1891). The massive tree was a gathering place for the local people and was so significant that the Tongva reportedly measured distances in relation to it "and traders from as far away as present-day Yuma knew the tree as a landmark." By the mid-eighteenth century, "the mighty sycamore stood at the center" of Yaanga.

In 1769, the Portolà expedition reached Yaanga. Father Juan Crespí recorded his first interaction with an expedition camp of Yaangavit on August 2:

As soon as we arrived about eight heathen from a good village came to visit us; they live in this delightful place among the trees on the River. They presented us with some baskets of pinole made from the seeds of sage and other grasses. Their chief brought some strings of beads made of shells, and they threw us three handfuls of them. Some of the old men were smoking pipes well made of baked clay and they puffed at us three mouthfuls of smoke. We gave them a little tobacco and glass beads, and they went away well pleased. On August 3rd, 1769, Crespí reached the village and described his interaction as follows: As they drew near us they began to howl like Wolves; they greeted us and wished to give us seeds, but as we had nothing at hand in which to carry them we did not accept them. Seeing this, they threw some handfuls of them on the ground and the rest in the air.

=== Mission period ===
With the founding of Mission San Gabriel in 1771, the Spanish began to the refer to Yaangavit as "Gabrieleños." Mission records indicated that about 179 Yaangavit were baptized at San Gabriel, the highest of any Tongva village, and 1 at San Fernando Mission.

The first town of Los Angeles was built next to Yaanga along the Los Angeles River by missionaries and Indian neophytes, or baptized converts, in 1781. It was called El Pueblo de Nuestra Señora la Reina de los Ángeles de Porciúncula (The Village of Our Lady, the Queen of the Angels of Porziuncola). Yaanga was used as a reference point by the pobladores (founders) of Los Angeles in the establishment of the pueblo. After the arrival of the colonizers, Yaanga soon ceased to function as it had for thousands of years.

In 1781, tensions emerged between the founders of Los Angeles and the Franciscan padres at Mission San Gabriel over who would have control over newly converted Christian villagers. Felipe de Neve, one of the founders of Los Angeles, traveled to Yaanga to select children for conversion to Christianity with the intent of transplanting villagers from the Mission to the secular pueblo, only having them "return to the missions periodically for religious instruction." Neve "personally acted as padrino, or godfather, at twelve of the baptisms" and renamed one couple Felipe and Phelipa Theresa de Neve and remarried them "in the eyes of the church." In 1784, a sister mission, the Nuestra Señora Reina de los Ángeles Asistencia was founded at Yaanga as well.

Yaangavit were treated as slave laborers by Franciscan padres to construct and work at San Gabriel Mission and Nuestra Señora Reina de los Ángeles Asistencia and forced laborers for the Spanish, Mexican, and American settlers to construct and expand Los Angeles. In 1803, Yaanga's population was reported to be 200. As the demand for "Indian labor" grew, the village became more of a place for refugees of surrounding villages destroyed or otherwise depleted from colonization. Historian William David Estrada states that during this time the village attracted people from local villages, "from the islands, as well as laborers from Missions San Diego and San Luis Rey and beyond... this symbiotic interdependency may have helped Yaanga survive longer than most rancherías."

=== Evictions and forced relocations ===
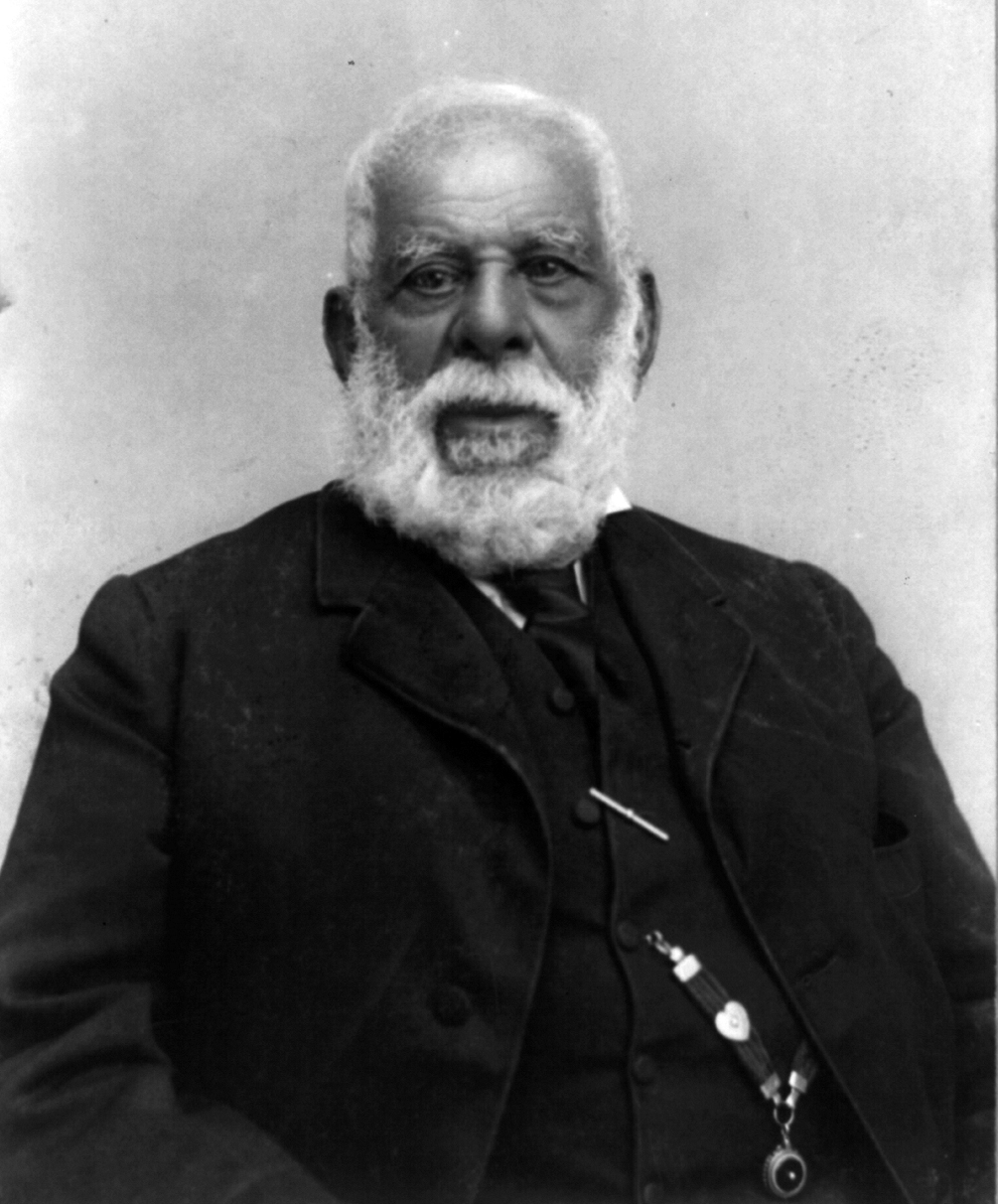
In 1845, Pío Pico, the last Mexican governor of California, accepted $200 from German resident Juan Domingo for the land which had been previously allotted to the Yaangavit in 1836. Domingo evicted the villagers, who were moved eastward across the Los Angeles River to what would be their final relocation site.

The original village of Yaanga is believed to have only remained intact until 1813 "when the final two baptisms of Yaanga residents (of the more than 200 recorded in Mission San Gabriel registers, 1771–1813) were noted." Researchers state that the villagers regrouped south of the original village site as early as the 1820s, at a location referred to be local residents as the Ranchería de los Poblanos. In the 1820s, immigrants from France came to Los Angeles in small numbers and settled around the Commercial and Alameda streets, close to the original village site of Yaanga. The ayuntamiunto (city council) passed new laws in Los Angeles which forced Indigenous peoples to work or be arrested. They conducted sweeps for "drunken Indians" which filled the city jails with Tongva villagers.

The Ranchería de los Poblanos was recorded to be in close proximity to the Nicoleños, who had previously been relocated in similar fashion in 1835. However, in 1836, Los Angeles residents complained about Indians bathing in the local canal, which prompted the forced relocation of the regrouped Yaangavit to a new site on flood-prone land. This new ranchería site is believed to have existed less than 10 years.

German sailor and immigrant Juan Domingo [Johann Gröningen], who lived in Los Angeles, submitted petitions to evict the Yaangavit and obtain the land that was allotted to them. Researchers note that Domingo did not wait to be approved though "and without permission built a fence across one of the rancherías that was adjacent to his own property." Three representatives of the relocated villages by the names of Gabriel, Juan José, and Gandiel submitted a petition protesting the illegal actions of Domingo on April 27, 1838, and asked that Domingo "be forced to remove his fence so they could build their homes." The City Council required Domingo to take down the fence."

However, in December 1845, Domingo purchased all of the land allotted to the villagers for $200, taking advantage of Pío Pico's need for additional monies and the general lack of respect for native title. As a result, the villagers were again forcibly relocated to a site called Pueblito, east across the Los Angeles River in what is now Boyle Heights, placing a divide between Mexican Los Angeles and the nearest Indigenous community. It was recorded by historian Kelly Lytle Hernández that "Native men, women, and children continued to live (not just work) in the city. On Saturday Nights, they even held parties, danced, and gambled at the removed Yaanga village and also at the plaza at the center of town." In response, the Californios continued to attempt to control the villagers lives, issuing Alta California Governor Pico a petition in 1846 stating: "We ask that the Indians be placed under strict police surveillance or the persons for whom the Indians work give [the Indians] quarter at the employer's rancho." This was despite the local economy's heavy dependence on Indian labor.

=== Elimination ===
During the Mexican–American War (1846–1848), the U.S. military invaded and occupied Los Angeles on August 13, 1846. Under American occupation, elimination became a core principle of governance and was a point of agreement between Anglo-Americans and Mexican citizens in Los Angeles. On a cold fall evening in 1847, the Pueblito site, which the Yaangavit had been relocated to only two years earlier, was razed to the ground. The Native inhabitants were dispersed into scattered smaller communities: others moved into the city to live nearer their employers. This was reportedly approved by the Los Angeles City Council and largely displaced the final generation of Yaangavit into the Calle de los Negros ("place of the dark ones") district.

Following its destruction, a series of armed raids were launched in the city's outskirts. These raids were state-sanctioned by Anglo-American Governor Peter Hardeman Burnett, who stated "that a war of extermination will continue to be waged between the races until the Indian race becomes extinct must be expected." The U.S. federal government subsidized these armed raids by paying bounties to vigilantes who killed "Indians." Disease also took a great toll among Natives in Los Angeles, which led to a massive population decline in the city between 1848 and 1880.

In 1852, Hugo Reid identified the historical locations of several villages in the Los Angeles Basin area, including Yaanga, prior to Spanish, Mexican, and American colonization. Reid published his research in 24 weekly installments from February to August 1852 for the Los Angeles Star. In 1859, in the wake of increasing criminalization and absorption into the city's burgeoning convict labor system, the county grand jury declared "stringent vagrant laws should be enacted and enforced compelling such persons ['Indians'] to obtain an honest livelihood or seek their old homes in the mountains." This declaration ignored Reid's research, which stated that most Tongva villages, including Yaanga, "were located in the basin, along its rivers and on its shoreline, stretching from the deserts and to the sea." Only a few villages led by tomyaars (chiefs) were "in the mountains, where Chengiichngech's avengers, serpents, and bears lived," as described by Lytle Hernández. However, "the grand jury dismissed the depths of Indigenous claims to life, land, and sovereignty in the region and, instead, chose to frame Indigenous peoples as drunks and vagrants loitering in Los Angeles."

== See also ==
- Achooykomenga (the site of Mission San Fernando)
- Acjacheme (the site of Mission San Juan Capistrano)
- Hahamongna
- Puhú
- Puvunga
- Toviscanga (the site of Mission San Gabriel)
