= Mocuachem =

Payómkawichum village

Mocuachem, or alternatively spelled Mukwa'shish, Mocuache, Mocuachame, and Moquache, was a Payómkawichum village in San Diego County, California. At least 12 people were baptized by Spanish missionaries from the village as an act of Christian conversion carried out primarily at Mission San Juan Capistrano.

The village was located in the Las Pulgas area, within the Camp Pendleton Papa One training area, along with the village site of Chacape, the latter of which was similarly listed in San Juan Capistrano baptismal mission records from 1779 to 1797 (alternative spellings: Chakapa, Chacapnga, Chcape, Chacape, Chacupe).

The village was located in the northwestern coastal areas of Payómkawichum influence, according to a map published in 1999 by John Johnson and Dinah Crawford.
