= Genga, California =

Former Tongva and Acjachemen village in Orange County, California

Coordinates: 33.6302°N 117.9496°W

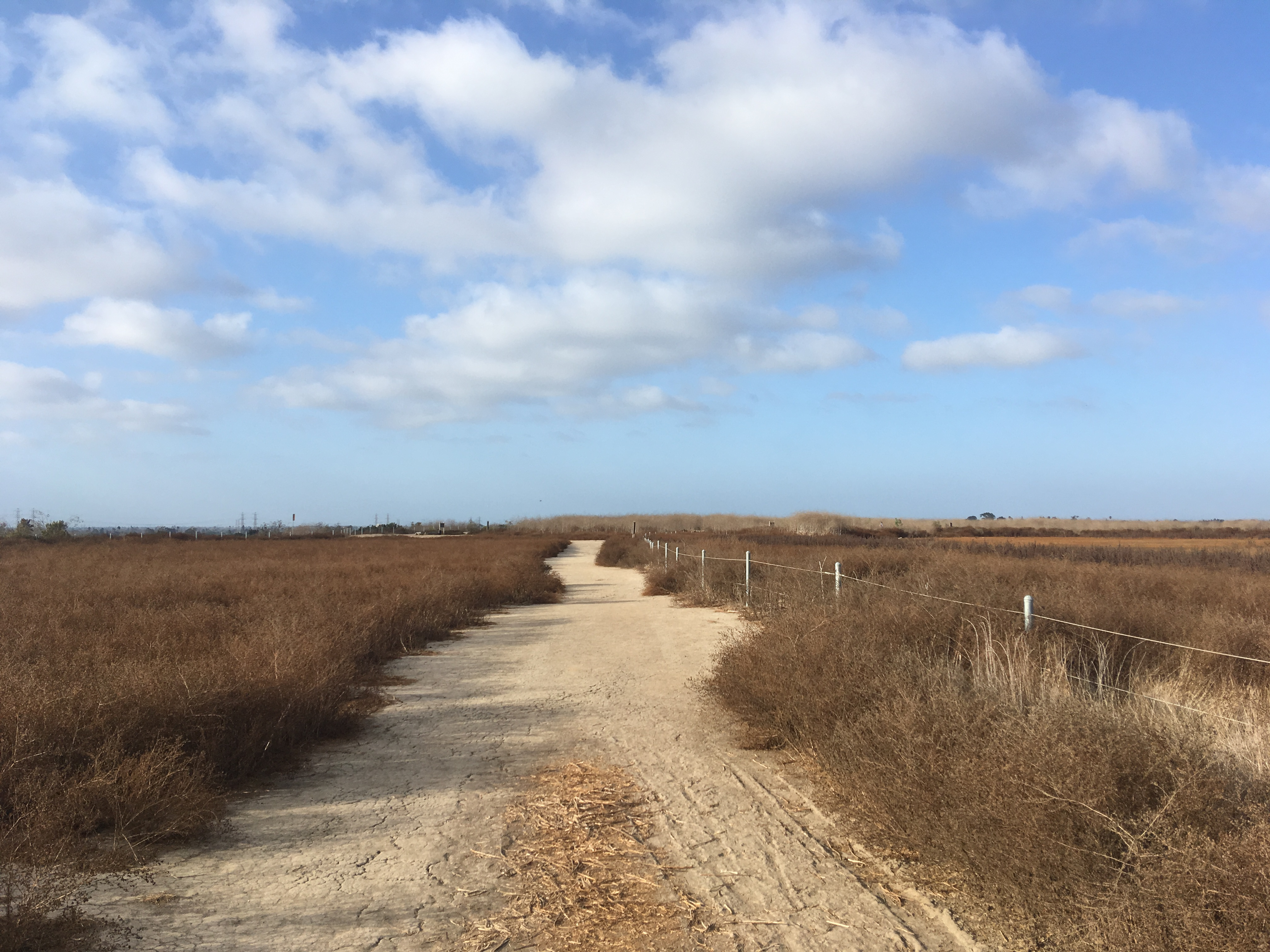
Fairview Park in Costa Mesa (2017) adjacent to Banning Ranch.

Genga, alternative spelling Gengaa and Kengaa, was a Tongva and Acjachemen village located in Westside Costa Mesa overlooking the Santa Ana River. The area which included an open site now referred to as Banning Ranch, is in Newport Beach. Archaeological evidence dates the village at over 9,000 years old. Villagers were recorded as Gebit in Spanish Mission records. The village may have been occupied as late as 1829 or 1830.

An attempt in 2001 to preserve a nearby 9,000 year old village site from commercial development failed. A similar attempt to save a burial site of Genga in the 2010s also failed. This has initiated concerns over preservation in the area. A large part of the contemporary site of Genga situated in Banning Ranch may be transformed into a public open space as of 2022. The Tongva and Acjachemen support having a voice in the process.

== History ==
=== Indigenous ===
Genga was in close proximity and had influence over Newport Bay, as reflected in the bay's original name given by the Spanish Bolsa de Gengar. The village's influence may have extended up to the northern San Joaquin Hills. One estimate placed the village population at around 100–150 at the time of contact. The village was multiethnic and multilingual, being shared by the Tongva and Acjachemen.

Archaeological evidence dates the village to be at least 9,000 years old. As a coastal village, the usage of te'aats may have been important to the village's people. It is also likely that, similar to the nearby village of Lupukngna, villagers primarily subsisted on acorns, seeds, berries, small game, fish and shellfish. Shell mounds were a part of village life. Cog stones have been found in the village area as well.

=== Spanish mission period ===
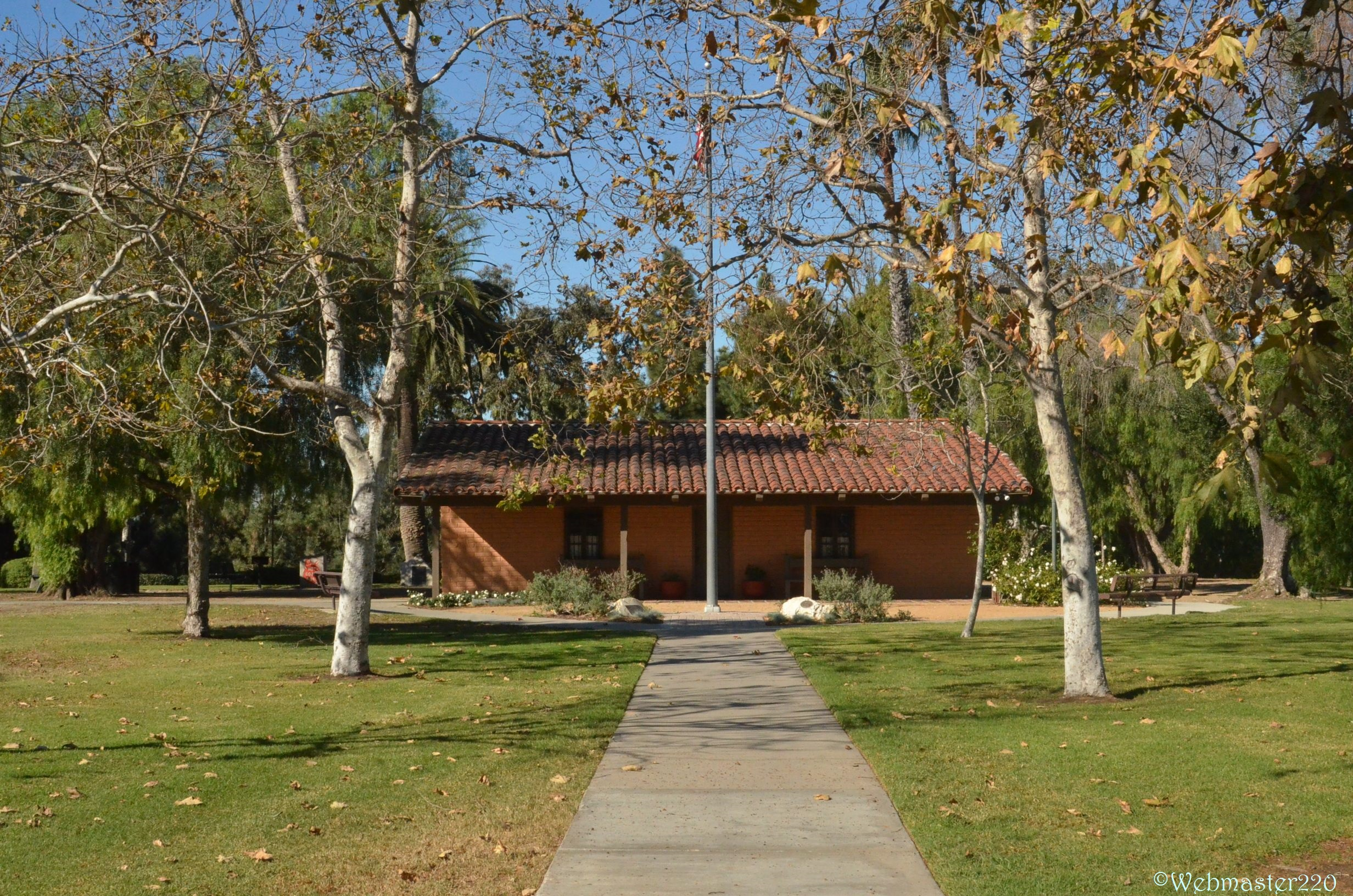
The Diego Sepúlveda Adobe was built in 1817 as a Mission outpost to surveil the villagers.

After the arrival of the Spanish colonizers, villagers were baptized at San Gabriel and San Juan Capistrano missions and had marriage ties with villagers from Hutuknga, Puvunga, and settlements around San Juan Capistrano. The Diego Sepúlveda Adobe was built overlooking Lupukngna and Genga from between 1817 and 1823 as an outpost "to watch over cattle and Indians." In 1827, missionaries considered whether to move their entire operation to the location.

Like many surrounding Tongva and Acjachemen villages, the village declined with the growth of the missions, where Indigenous labor was exploited to construct mission facilities and tend to the mission's grounds. By the early nineteenth century, the village was being depleted and may have been occupied until 1829 or 1830. Yet, the place name carried forward in the nineteenth century, with the bay being labeled the bolsa de gengara, an alternative spelling of the village, on an 1853 map.

=== Preservation attempts ===
Human remains from the village were uncovered in the 2010s. Although Tongva and Acjachemen people campaigned to stop the development of a site where six hundred of their ancestors' remains were found, their attempt failed. The remains were moved from the original burial site, which now sits under a parking lot next to a bank, to a dirt lot about a half-mile away. Lack of federal recognition of the Tongva and Acjachemen prevents them from controlling their ancestral remains and artifacts.

In 2013, the city of Costa Mesa may have approved plans to construct over a site near the village location in nearby Fairview Park, despite archaeologists and Indigenous people speaking against further development in the area given the significance of the site, as well as its listing on the National Register of Historic Places since 1972. There were further concerns that the archaeological survey was being conducted by the Scientific Resource Surveys, Inc. (SRS), which has a poor track record in the area for preserving Tongva village sites, being fined $600,000 for digging trenches into a 9,000 year old village site in Bolsa Chica in 2001.

Banning Ranch, part of the site of Genga, which had been a large coastal oil field since 1943, may be transformed into a public open space as of 2022 after many years of organizing to preserve the site both as green space for the city as well as for historic preservation. City leaders of the project have said that "tribal descendants of the area’s earliest residents will also have a voice" in how the park is developed.

== See also ==
Achachemen villages in Orange County, California

- Acjacheme
- Alauna
- Piwiva
- Putiidhem

Tongva villages in Orange County, California

- Hutuknga
- Lupukngna
- Moyongna
- Pajbenga
- Pamajam
- Totpavit
