= Totpavit =

Former Tongva village in Olive, California

Totpavit, alternative spellings Totabit and possibly Totavet, was a Tongva village located in what is now Olive, California. The village was located between the Santa Ana River and Santiago Creek. It was part of a series of villages along the Santa Ana River, including Genga, Pajbenga, and Hutuknga.

Mission records indicate that 11 people from the village were baptized, likely at Mission San Gabriel, from between 1781 and 1803, including 3 men, 7 women, and 1 child. In 1978, it was indicated that the village site was probably buried under alluvium and that the village site had been occupied for thousands of years.

The village's name derived from the word "tota," which was recorded as meaning "rock" in the Tongva language.

== See also ==
- Genga
- Lupukngna
- Yaanga
