= Ahunx =

Village site

Ahunx ("elevated") was a village site significant to the Payómkawichum and Acjachemen located between the old town of El Toro (now referred to as Lake Forest, California) and Tomato Springs (located in the Portola Springs area).

In geological terms, it was located north of the San Joaquin Hills on the southern edge of the Tustin Plain. Some researchers have placed the village site between Serrano Creek and Agua Chinon Creek in an elevated area, while others place it about one mile west from Los Alisos Creek. Much of the areas of the Tustin Plain were uninhabited, since this region was a giant swamp prior to the 20th century.

Ahunx appears in Payómkawichum legend as a significant site. The site was also significant to the Acjachemen, indicating connections between the two groups.

== See also ==
- Acjacheme
- Alume
- Putiidhem
