= Piwiva =

Former Acjachemen village in Rancho Mission Viejo, California

Coordinates: 33.5228°N 117.5987°W

A map of a Acjachemen villages including Piwiva.

Piwiva was a Acjachemen village located at the confluence of San Juan Creek and Cañada Gobernadora tributary in what is now Rancho Mission Viejo, California. The name for the village was closely related to the Payómkawichum word for wild tobacco piivat. It was located north of Mission San Juan Capistrano, downstream from the village of Huumai and upstream from the village of Sajavit. Alternative names for the village include Pii'iv, Pivits, and Peviva.

== History ==
The village was visited by the Portolá expedition in January 1770, after being missed on the first pass through the area in July 1769. Juan Crespí described the encounter as follows: "We met with no villages here on the way going up, but now we came upon some small houses roofed with tule rushes, with a good many gentile men, women and children living encamped here in the hollow. No sooner did they see us than, as if pleased, they set up a great hubbub, and all came over weaponless to the camp, very well pleased, and spent the rest of the afternoon staying with us."

In 1964, Clarence H. Lobo, chief of the Acjachemen people, made a bid to reclaim the village site, which was a campground at the time. Lobo spoke how the US Senate Act of 1891, which established the Mission Indian Commission, was supposed to provide native people with 640 acres of land after it had been lost to white settlers in the 1850s, but that the act was broken, like many before: "it is apparently just another treaty made to be broken in the long history of whites take over Indian's lands. Maybe now we can see if the federal government will finally live up to its word."

== See also ==
- Acjacheme
- Alume
- Putiidhem
