= Puvunga =

Indigenous sacred site in Long Beach, California, US

- Puvunga Indian Village Sites and Boundary Increase
- U.S. National Register of Historic Places
- U.S. Historic district
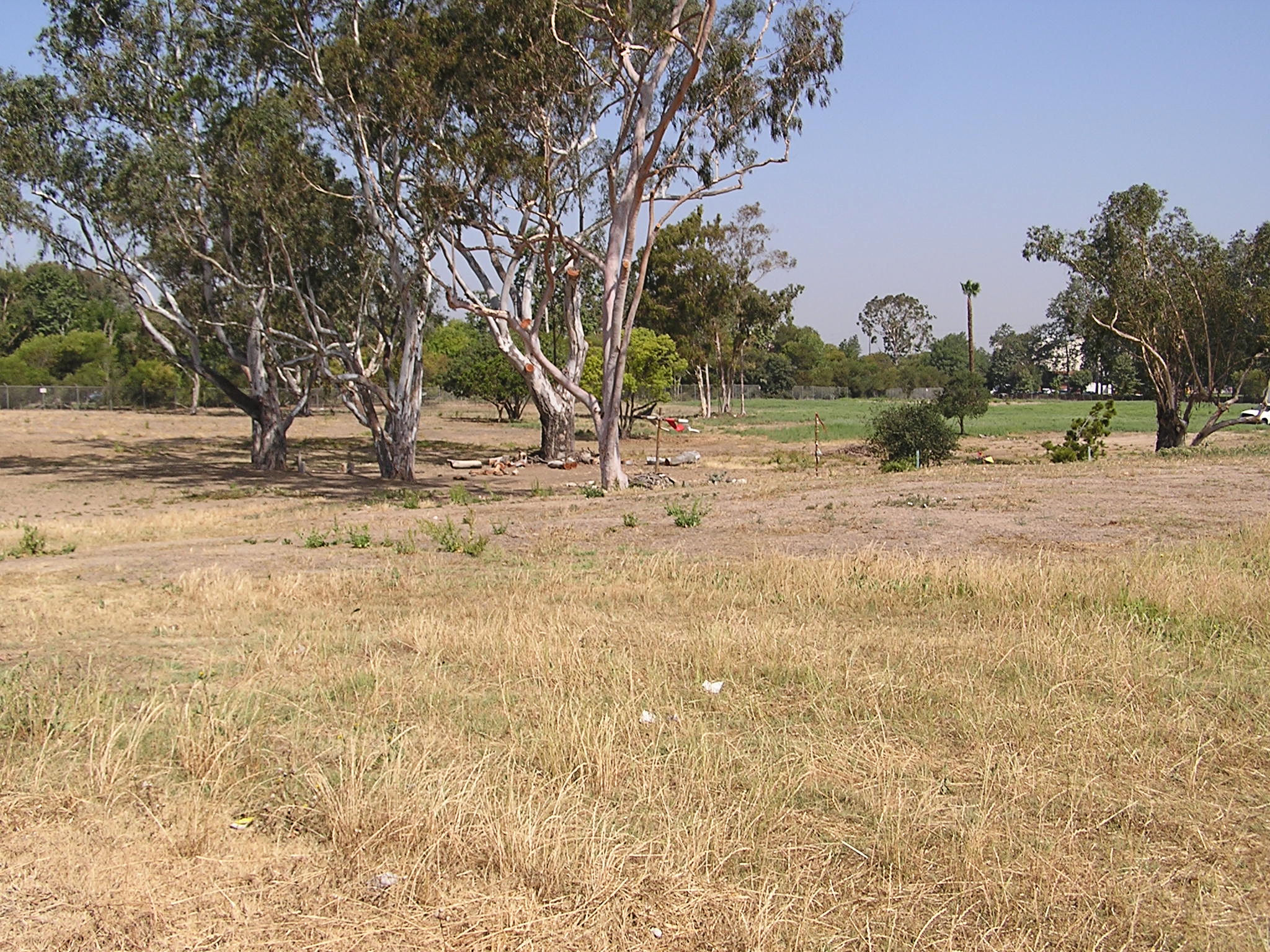
- The Puvunga site on the campus of Cal State Long Beach

- Location within the Los Angeles metropolitan area Location within California Location within the United States
- Nearest city: Long Beach, California
- Coordinates: 33.785°N 118.121°W
- Architect: Tongva
- NRHP reference No.: 74000521 (original); 82000429 (increase)

Significant dates
- Added to NRHP: January 21, 1974
- Boundary increase: May 22, 1982

Puvunga (alternatively spelled Puvungna or Povuu'nga) is an ancient village and sacred site of the Tongva nation, the Indigenous people of the Los Angeles Basin, and the Acjachemen, the Indigenous people of Orange County. The site is now located within the California State University, Long Beach campus and surrounding areas. The Tongva know Puvunga as the "place of emergence" and it is where they believe "their world and their lives began". Puvunga is an important ceremonial site and is the terminus of an annual pilgrimage for the Tongva, Acjachemen, and Chumash.

Before the arrival of European settlers, Puvunga extended far beyond the contemporary site that remains today. Its presence was first uncovered in 1952, and then in 1974, at the designated location, when trenching was done for the Earl Burns Miller Japanese Garden. The site was listed on the National Register of Historic Places in 1974. In 1992, the university challenged its historic designation and threatened to forcefully build a strip mall on the site, which was blocked by direct action and intervention by the ACLU. In 2019, dirt and trash were dumped on the site by the university.

The site is located near the Japanese Garden along the banks of a now channelized creek, about three miles (5 km) from the Pacific Ocean. The natural area is located near a parking lot at the edge of campus. There was a natural spring located a short distance from the Rancho Alamitos building that flowed until 1956 referred to as Puvunga Spring. Another similar (but larger) Tongva site is Kuruvungna Springs on the grounds of University High School in Los Angeles.

== Etymology ==
Puvunga can mean "the place of the gathering" or "in the ball", depending on the source.

== Significance ==
The site has been listed on the National Register of Historic Places since 1974 for its historical and cultural significance. It remains a ceremonial site for the Acjachemen, Tongva, and Chumash for intertribal gatherings. Puvunga also serves the endpoint of an annual pilgrimage that begins at the village site of Panhe, now located in San Onofre.

The Tongva and Acjachemen remember the village as home to Wiyot, one of the First Beings who was their sacred leader. It is "the place of emergence" or where "their world and their lives began". In Tongva traditional narratives, it is also, a few centuries later, the birthplace of Chinigchinix, "the prophet or deity who appears at Puvunga after Wiyot, the creator, has been killed, and tells the assembly what they must do to feed themselves."

Rare bird species have been identified on the site by the Audubon Society.

== History ==
=== Regional trading and ceremonial center ===
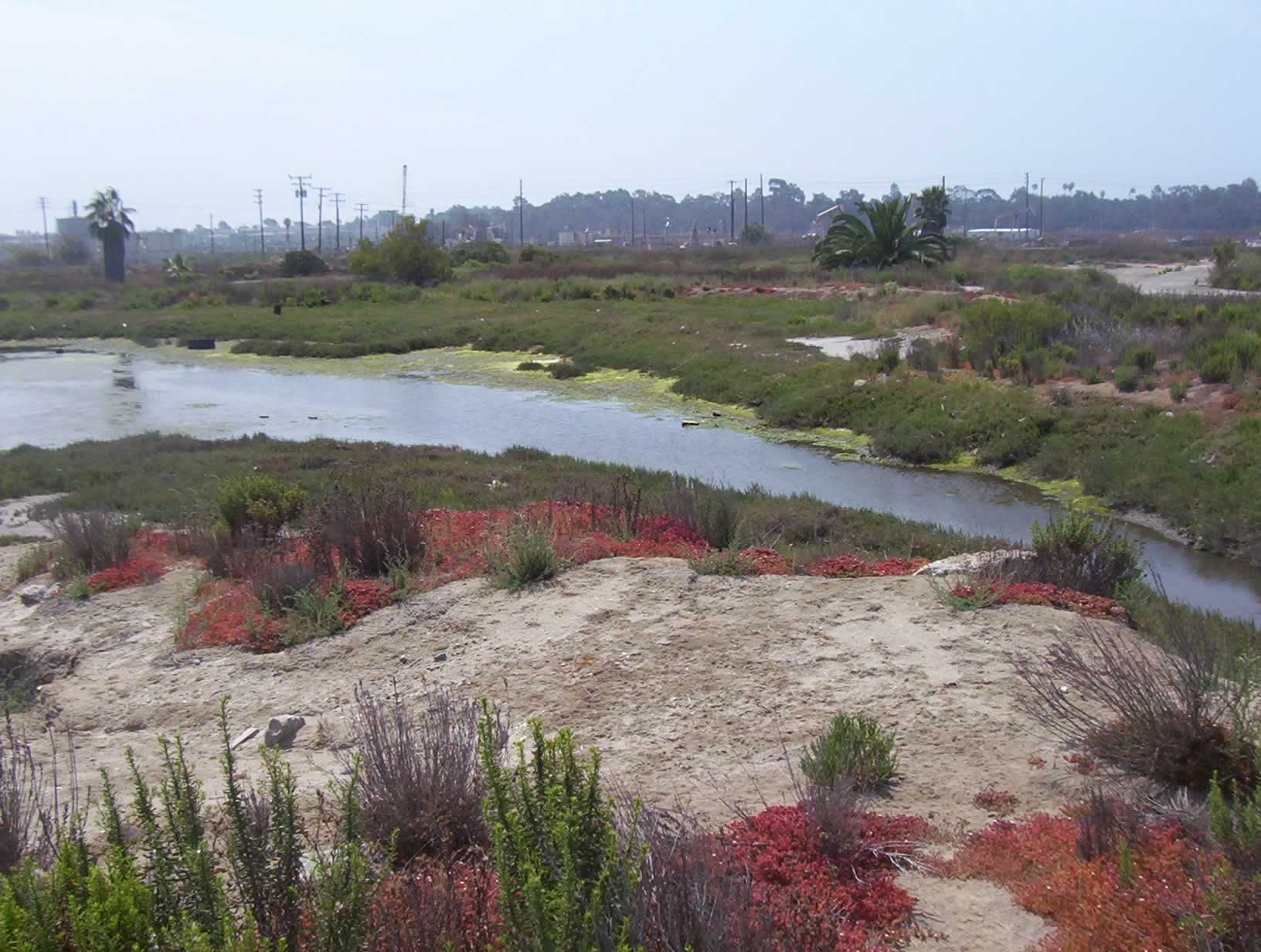
The wetlands of Puvunga are now referred to as the Los Cerritos Wetlands (2018).

Puvunga once stood on a rounded knoll or small hill above the expansive wetlands (now known as the Los Cerritos Wetlands) of the San Gabriel River. The Pacific Ocean came up to the bluff of the village, though it has since been pushed several miles west by settlers and commercial development.

Puvunga was a large village that extended far beyond the remaining area associated with the village. It was a regional trading and ceremonial center for the Tongva and Acjachemen. Villagers used te'aats to travel on culturally-important journeys out to villages on Pimu (Santa Catalina Island) and other islands off the coast, now referred to as the Channel Islands.

Nearby coastal villages included: the very close settlement of Motuucheyngna (at modern-day Seal Beach), now sometimes referred to in archaeological terms as Puvungna East; Guashna (now at Playa Vista) located about twenty miles up the coast; and the village of Lupukngna, located down the coastline at the mouth of the Santa Ana River.

=== Colonization ===
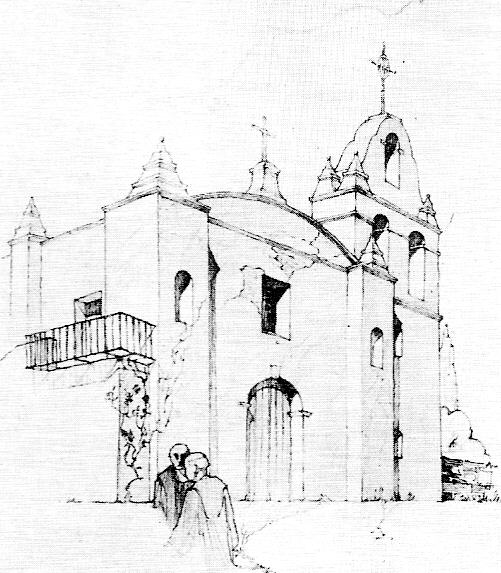
Villagers from Puvunga were brought to and labored at Mission San Gabriel (pictured) between 1785 and 1805.

Like many other Tongva villages in the greater Los Angeles Basin area, village life at Puvunga deteriorated immensely with the arrival of Spanish missionaries and soldiers.

With the establishment of Mission San Gabriel in 1771, many people from surrounding villages were brought to the mission for conversion and for their labor. They worked on the grounds of the mission in conditions that were recognized as slavery by third-party observers at the time. Between 1785 and 1805, mission records noted numerous baptisms of villagers from Puvunga, indicating that the village was likely depleted shortly after.

In 1822, Geronimo Boscana referred to the village as Pubuna and located it within the Spanish land grant Rancho de los Nietos established in 1784, which was eight leagues northwest of Mission San Juan Capistrano.

Many villagers likely died at the mission and many did not survive the mission period. At Mission San Gabriel, there were a total of 7,854 baptisms (2,459 children) and 5,656 deaths (2,916 children) until secularization in 1834, indicating a very high rate of death. Children often died very young at the missions. One missionary at Mission San Gabriel reported that three out of every four children born died before age two.

In 1844, Hugo Reid referred to the village as Pubugna and stated it could still be identified as existing at Rancho Los Alamitos, which was a subdivision of Rancho de los Nietos.

John Peabody Harrington identified the presence of shell middens in the Rancho Los Alamitos area. At the time, Harrington consulted three Indigenous informants, Jose de Los Santos Juncos, José de Grácia Cruz, and a "very old informant" Guorojos. All three identified the site in Los Alamitos as the village, which they referred to as "Puvu'na" or "Puvu". Harrington's report of these events was published in 1933.

=== Development and recognition ===
In June 1950, the City Council of Long Beach purchased a 320-acre tract of land (130 ha) inside their municipal boundaries. The land contained a large portion of the historical village of Puvunga, and was used to build the campus of California State University of Long Beach. On Christmas Eve of 1952, a burial site in Puvunga was discovered about a mile north of the California State University, Long Beach campus (then referred to as Long Beach State College) when workers of the L. S. Whaley Company uncovered two dozen ancestral remains and funerary objects during the construction of a housing development. In 1952, an article for the Long Beach Press-Telegram wrote that the "ruins might be part of Pubunga, an ancient 'holy city.'"

In 1955, it was noted by Helen Smith Giffen that there were "shell debris littering the fields below the Los Alamitos ranch house [which] bear witness to the fact that this was once the site of an Indian rancheria [Puvunga]." She noted that there was still a "wonderful spring" which flowed at the location.

On the first official Earth Day celebration, organic gardens were established on the 22 acres (8.9 ha) of Puvunga that were still undeveloped and available to the public. The garden site was used to grow various foods for personal consumption.

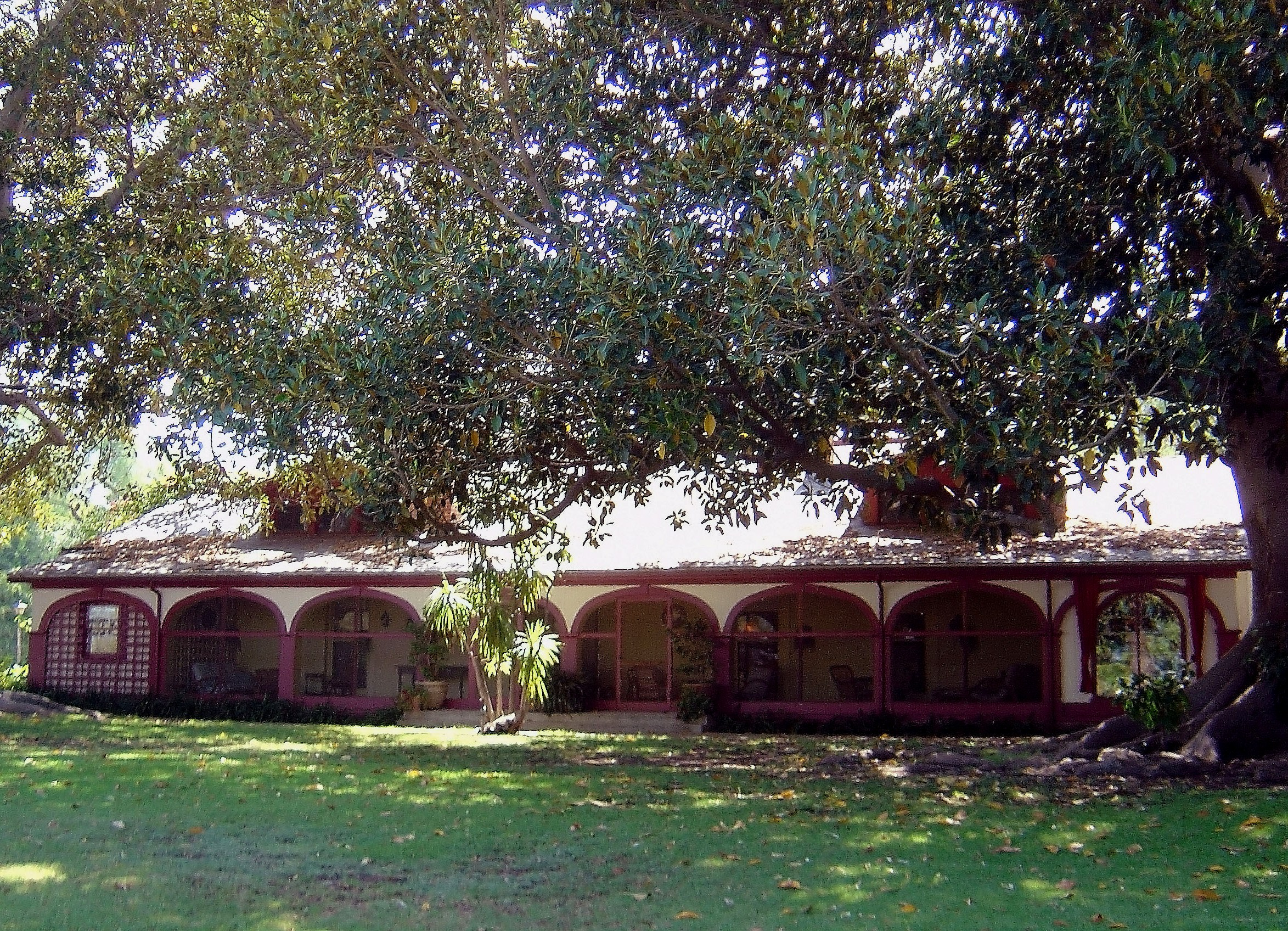
Sites of Puvunga were also found at the nearby Rancho Los Alamitos site.

In 1972, campus workmen uncovered portions of a burial at site LAn-235 on the western edge of campus. Funding for the 1973 excavation was provided by the City of Long Beach, Long Beach Historical Society, Rancho Los Alamitos Associates, and private donors. Tongva remnants unearthed included arrowheads and pottery sherds in a style called Cerritos Brown ware. These remains were placed in CSULB's archaeology lab.

Archaeologists in 1974 wrote that the Tongva "abruptly abandoned the site in the early 1800s, only a year or so before the first white family took possession of the land". That same year, LAn-235 was placed on the National Register of Historic Places to represent Puvungna "as a means of perpetuating the memory of these native peoples and their religion, and as an aid to the program of public education". Two other sites were included in the National Register: the adjacent LAn-234 and LAn-306, located just east of campus on the grounds of the historic Rancho Los Alamitos.

In 1979, a reburial of an individual disinterred in 1972 occurred. After this reburial, campus workers erected a small engraved wooden sign at the site, which read "Gabrieleno Indians once inhabited this site, Puvunga, the birthplace of Chungicnish, law-giver and god."

More than a dozen archaeological sites, spread over an area of about 500 acres (2.0 km^{2}) on and near the campus, have been identified as Puvungna village sites. A shopping center and apartments at 7th Street and Pacific Coast Highway, Long Beach Veterans Administration Hospital, Rancho Los Alamitos and the college now stand atop the historic settlement "near the present-day mouth of the San Gabriel River and the Cerritos Channel".

=== Threats and disturbance ===
Despite its known cultural importance, in 1992, the university attempted to challenge Puvunga's designation as a historic site to construct a strip mall over the remaining grounds of Puvunga as well as over a nearby organic community garden that had been established on the first Earth Day. When gardeners organized to prevent a parking lot development intended for the strip mall site, campus officials ignored them. They moved forward with development, claiming that "no cultural resources" were on site.

In response, the Tongva and others organized to stop the development and save the site from destruction. They initiated protests and filed a lawsuit that temporarily stalled any construction. The university's sudden hostile attitude toward the preservation of the site has been credited to a change in the university's leadership and the recent decline in California state support for public education, which had pushed universities to find economic revenue sources "to replace state support for higher education that [had] drastically eroded in the last two decades".

As a result, direct action was initiated to prevent the site's development, including protest tent campsites and prayer vigils. In response, the university built a fence around the area and ordered, under threat of arrest, that protestors leave the site. This prompted the American Civil Liberties Union (ACLU) to get involved and file a preliminary injunction against the university. Raleigh Levine of the ACLU stated, "This case is about the First Amendment rights of the Native Americans to whom Puvungna is sacred. They have the right to freely exercise their beliefs without the state stepping in to pave over their place of worship and put a mini-mall on it."

A short film of the event titled Sacred Lands, White Man's Laws was made available in 1994.

In 1995, Robert Maxson became President of the university. He pledged to abandon all plans of commercial development on the land and to preserve it, maintaining the open space, as long as he was president. He kept his promise until he left office in 2006.

A burial site in the greater Puvunga area was disturbed in the construction of the neighborhood of Hellman Ranch in the adjacent city of Seal Beach. The site is sometimes archaeologically referred to as Puvungna East or as the village of Motuucheyngna, because of its proximity to Puvugna and in acknowledgment of the large area the village once comprised. About 35 bodies were disturbed in the development of Hellman Ranch, along with numerous artifacts of the Tongva.

In 2019, CSULB received backlash after dumping dirt and trash on the site. Local self-identified Indigenous groups, such as the Juaneño Band of Mission Indians (Acjachemen Nation), were not consulted in regard to the dumping. This resulted in a legal challenge by the tribe which halted the dumping in October 2019. The legal proceedings were stalled due to the COVID-19 pandemic. Chairman of the tribe Matias Belardes commented on how the dumping reflected a shift in attitude from the university since the 1992 lawsuit:

We’ve had a decent relationship since then [the 1992 strip mall incident] .... [We] find it disrespectful and disheartening. Ever since that lawsuit, it was thought that there would be a better understanding of what that site means to us. Somewhere along the way, there’s been a disconnect. Now we’re back to square one after all these positive things from the original lawsuit all those years ago. We thought we were past it already. It shouldn’t have come to this. The university should know the site's significance, what it means to the tribes, and what you can and can’t do on the property.

In response, six departments at CSULB are developing film and educational resources to teach the campus community about the significance of the site in an attempt to prevent future damage.

In August 2020, the California Office of Historical Preservation criticized the university for damaging the site. The following January, the university's president issued a message claiming that rumors of development on the site of Puvungna were untrue, but a report released three months later showed that the university did have plans of building another parking lot on the site. The same month, a number of organizations and tribal nations sent governor Gavin Newson a letter requesting that he restore Puvungna. In August 2021, the Native American Heritage Commission started a formal investigation on the topic. One month later, a settlement was reached prohibiting the development of the land and allowing tribal nations to use Puvungna for their traditional activities. Under the terms of the settlement, removing the construction debris is not the university's responsibility.

== See also ==
- Genga – Former Tongva and Acjachemen village in Orange County, California
- Puhú – Historical native American village in California, US
- Yaanga – Former Tongva village in Los Angeles, California
- Population of Native California
- Native Americans in the United States
