= Traditional narratives of Indigenous Californians =

Folklore and mythology of the native people of California

The traditional narratives of Native Indigenous Californians are the folklore and mythology of the native people of California. In California, most of the native peoples can be categorized into three large groups, Penutian, Hokan and Uto-Aztecan. For many historic nations of California, there is only a fragmentary record of their traditions. Spanish missions in California from the 18th century Christianized many of these traditions, and the remaining groups were mostly assimilated to US culture by the early 20th century. Due to assimilation many native groups lost the original folklore and mythology that was integrated into their culture and traditions, resulting in the blurred and changed stories that are known today. While there are sparse records from the 18th century, most material was collected during the 19th and the early 20th centuries.

In California, most of the native peoples can be categorized into three large groups, Penutian, Hokan and Uto-Aztecan. Of these traditions, one of the best attested and most notable in US mainstream culture is Hopi mythology, the Hopi being a Pueblo people speaking a language of the Uto-Aztecan family.

== History of colonial studies ==
A few versions of Native California traditional narratives were written down by Franciscan missionaries, notably Jerónimo Boscana in the early nineteenth century. Travelers, government agents, and local residents, such as Hugo Reid and Stephen Powers, added to this documentation in the later nineteenth century.

As anthropology in the United States transformed itself into a profession in the early twentieth century, preserving a record of native myths became one of its first major undertakings. Alfred L. Kroeber at the University of California, Berkeley, was a key instigator of these efforts, and the University's publication series, such as the University of California Publications in American Archaeology and Ethnology, as well as the Journal of American Folklore and other national journals, were important outlets for the results of the studies. However many stories learned from these publications lack true indigenous aspects. Many stories throughout the years have been Christianized and transformed into stories that benefit the colonial side of American Folklore instead of the original traditional narratives told by the indigenous peoples of California that are used to preserve their cultures and traditions.

After the middle of the twentieth century, the work slowed somewhat. Much of the basic documentary work had been completed, and native cultural traditions had grown weaker with the passing of the decades. The reasoning for the cultural traditions being weakened was due to colonial America and the demand for indigenous people to assimilate into California. Many native indigenous people of California had to choice but to assimilate due to violence and therefore lost their traditions and culture. However, important contributions have continued to be made, especially in the presentation of narratives within their original languages as well as in translation. Many of these contributions were made by the surviving descendants of the first Californians, through their oral transmission many narratives were able to be preserved in their original traditional ways.

== General characteristics ==
Several general traits are recognizable in California's traditional narratives. These traits are not universally present, but they characterize many of the known narratives:

=== Fluid genres ===
Folklorists have commonly attempted to distinguish between myths, legends, tales, and histories.

- Myths are sacred accounts that are believed by narrators and listeners to be true. They are set in a period at or before the origins of the world as it is known, and they usually contain strong supernatural elements.
- Legends are also believed to be true, and they may also contain fantastic elements. However, they are set later in time, after the world had assumed the form in which it was known to traditional cultures.
- Tales are entertaining stories that narrators and listeners are not required to believe as true.
- Histories are narratives of actually witnessed events that have been transmitted, with greater or less embellishment, to subsequent generations.

In the oral literature of native California, the lines between these genres are typically not at all carefully observed. It is often impossible to classify a narrative definitively as a myth, a legend, a tale, or a history. Cognate versions of the same narrative as told by different narrators may fall within different genres.

=== Sharing among neighbors ===
Many of the narratives are entirely unique, existing in only a single version. However, many others are known in multiple versions that vary but are clearly cognate with one another. The versions may come from different narrators within a single ethnolinguistic group, from different groups within a region of the Californias, or from groups that are scattered across the North American continent and even beyond. Patterns in the relative similarity of shared narratives are almost entirely dictated by the historic-period propinquity of the groups sharing narratives. Few if any patterns reflect preferential sharing among historically dispersed groups that originally shared a common linguistic descent. This suggests ongoing, creative modification of narratives, rather than rigid conservatism. Within the creative modification of narratives comes the opportunity for change, because of this many lines of genres are blurred within traditional narratives. Many narratives that used to be preserved in culture and tradition to specific regions and groups of peoples have been shifted to the appeal of American Folklore.

=== Weak narrative unity ===
Lengthy traditional narratives tend to have an episodic or picaresque character. Their unity comes mainly from the presence of a continuing central character or from a causal sequence of events, rather than from any overall theme, plot, or narrative purpose.

=== Fluidity in content ===
As a reflection of weak narrative unity, the stories often have a composite character. Motifs are rather freely added, dropped, or transferred from one narrative to another.

=== Moral ambiguity ===
In the traditional narratives of native North America, the Western expectation of essentially "good" or "evil" characters or events is generally not met. The same character is likely to act beneficently in one episode but malevolently in the next, according to the accepted norms of behavior or to criteria of general welfare. Many of the early discussions of this literature by outside observers were marred by attempts to characterize a mythic personage as either a beloved benefactor or an evil trickster, when both of these labels might be equally true, or equally false. Due to the outside observers, many of these characters and ideas that are traditional to native groups are changed and made to fit into the criteria of American Folklore, such as the concept of good and evil.

=== Surrealism in time ===
The events of traditional narratives are rarely set within realistic chronological frameworks. Time spans measured in years or decades are rarely specified. Characters often are conceived and grow to maturity within miraculously short periods.

=== Animal - human ambiguity ===
The characters in many narratives are known by the names of animals (or, less commonly, by the names of plants or other natural features). Often it is understood that the character is the forebear or prototype of the animal species. Its conversation, actions, and motives are usually human, while its physical characteristics may be either human or animal, and commonly the two are mixed in a biologically inconsistent manner. Native groups such as Penutian, Hokan and Uto-Aztecan have a deep emotional and interconnected relationship with the natural world and the human world. Many native groups gain their sense of belonging from their ancestral homelands, creating a connection from the relationship that they have with the environment around them.

== Regional patterns ==
=== Kroeber's view ===
Alfred L. Kroeber distinguished three main cultural regions within California. Each of these was seen as having a distinctive pattern in its traditional narratives that set it apart from neighboring regions.

- The small Northwest region was focused on the Hupa, Karok, and Yurok. A creation myth was lacking in this region. Narratives typically related to a race that had preceded the known human beings in the regions. Long stories about the travels and adventures of a culture hero were characteristic.
- The Central region, encompassing most of California, possessed a creation myth that often employed the Earth Diver motif. Kroeber distinguished North Central and South Central divisions within this region, consisting respectively of the Sacramento and San Joaquin valleys plus the coastal and mountain areas adjacent to them.
- The Southern region included Takic- and Yuman-speaking groups. It had a distinctive creation myth but lacked most of the tales common in the Central region, at least to judge from the surviving records.

=== Gayton's view ===
Anna H. Gayton reexamined Kroeber's regional divisions. While finding them generally valid, she stressed the gradational character of the transitions between the regions. She also suggested that variability in their links with regions outside of California was a key to understanding internal differences:

- Links with the Northwest Coast region of North America permeated Kroeber's Northwest region within California. These links extended well beyond the Hupa-Karok-Yurok core, as far south as the Pomo and as far east as the Achomawi.
- Links with the Plateau region extended throughout northernmost California, from Kroeber's Northwest region to the Yana and Achomawi in the east.
- Links with the Great Basin were pronounced not only east of the Sierra Nevada but also in the western foothills of that range and in upper Sacramento Valley and the Mojave Desert, from the Shasta to the Serrano.
- Southern California was strongly tied to the Yuman-speaking area of western Arizona.
- In central California Gayton discerned a relatively discrete nucleus of groups lacking such strong external influences. These included the Miwok, Yokuts, Salinan, Ohlone, and Patwin.

== Multi-ethnic collections ==
- Bright, William. 1978. Coyote Stories. International Journal of American Linguistics Native American Texts Series No. 1. University of Chicago Press.
- Bright, William. 1993. A Coyote Reader. University of California Press, Berkeley.
- Brandon, William The Magic World: American Indian Songs and Poems (1971) ISBN 0-8214-0991-3
- Curtis, Edward S. 1907-1930. The North American Indian. 20 vols. Plimpton Press, Norwood, Massachusetts.
- Erdoes, Richard, and Alfonso Ortiz. 1984. American Indian Myths and Legends. Pantheon Books, New York.
- Gifford, Edward Winslow, and Gwendoline Harris Block. 1930. California Indian Nights. Arthur H. Clark, Glendale, California.
- Hinton, Leanne, and Lucille J. Watahomigie. 1984. Spirit Mountain: An Anthology of Yuman Story and Song. University of Arizona Press, Tucson.
- Judson, Katharine Berry. 1912. Myths and Legends of California and the Old Southwest. A. C. McClurg, Chicago.
- Kroeber, A. L. 1907. "Indian Myths of South Central California". University of California Publications in American Archaeology and Ethnology 4:167-250. Berkeley.
- Kroeber, Theodora 1959. The Inland Whale. University of California Press.
- Luthin, Herbert W. 2002. Surviving through the Days: A California Indian Reader. University of California Press, Berkeley.
- Margolin, Malcolm. 1993. The Way We Lived: California Indian Stories, Songs, and Reminiscences. First edition 1981. Heyday Books, Berkeley, California.
- Powers, Stephen. 1877. Tribes of California. Contributions to North American Ethnology, vol. 3. Government Printing Office, Washington, D.C. Reprinted with an introduction by Robert F. Heizer in 1976, University of California Press, Berkeley.
- Swann, Brian. 1994. Coming to Light: Contemporary Translations of the Native Literatures of North America. Random House, New York.
- Thompson, Stith. 1929. Tales of the North American Indians. Harvard University Press, Cambridge, Massachusetts.

== Comparative studies and discussions ==
- Applegate, Richard. 1977. "Native California Concepts of the Afterlife". In Flowers of the Wind: Papers on Ritual, Myth and Symbolism in California and the Southwest, edited by Thomas C. Blackburn, pp. 105–119. Ballena Press, Socorro, New Mexico.
- Bierhorst, John. 1985. The Mythology of North America. Quill, New York.
- Bright, William. 1996. "Oral Literature of California and the Intermountain Region". In Handbook of Native American Literature, edited by Andrew Wiget, pp. 47–52. Garland Publishing, New York.
- Demetracopoulou, Dorothy. 1933. "The Loon Woman Myth: A Study in Synthesis". Journal of American Folklore 46:375-500.
- Gayton, Anna H. 1935. "The Orpheus Myth in North America". Journal of American Folklore 48:263-293.
- Gayton, Anna H. 1935. "Areal Affiliations of California Folktales". American Anthropologist 37:582-599.
- Gifford, Edward Winslow, and Gwendoline Harris Block. 1930. California Indian Nights. Arthur H. Clark, Glendale, California.
- Heizer, Robert F. 1978. "Mythology: Regional Patterns and History of Research". In California, edited by Robert F. Heizer, pp. 654–657. Handbook of North American Indians, William C. Sturtevant, general editor, Vol. 8. Smithsonian Institution, Washington, D.C.
- Kroeber, A. L. 1904. "Types of Indian Culture in California". University of California Publications in American Archaeology and Ethnology 2:81-103. Berkeley.
- Kroeber, A. L. 1907. "The Religion of the Indians of California". University of California Publications in American Archaeology and Ethnology 4:319-356. Berkeley.
- Laylander, Don. 2005. "Myths about Myths: Clues to the Time Depth of California's Ethnographic Record". Proceedings of the Society for California Archaeology 18:65-69.
- Lowie, Robert H. 1908. "The Test-Theme in North American Mythology". Journal of American Folklore 21:97-148.
- Reichard, Gladys A. 1921. "Literary Types and Dissemination of Myths". Journal of American Folklore 34:269-307.
- Anna Birgitta Rooth. 1957. "The Creation Myths of the North American Indians". Anthropos 1957:497-508. Reprinted in Sacred Narrative: Readings in the Theory of Myth, edited by Alan Dundes, 1984, University of California Press, Berkeley, pp. 166–181.
- Schmerler, Henrietta. 1931. "Trickster Married His Daughter". Journal of American Folklore 44:196-207.
- Sutton, Mark Q. 1993. "The Numic Expansion in Great Basin Oral Tradition". Journal of California and Great Basin Anthropology 15:111-128.
- Thompson, Stith. 1929. Tales of the North American Indians. Harvard University Press, Cambridge, Massachusetts.
- Thompson, Stith. 1946. The Folktale. Holt, Rinehart and Winston, New York.
- Wallace, William J. 1978. "Comparative Literature". In California, edited by Robert F. Heizer, pp. 658–661. Handbook of North American Indians, William C. Sturtevant, general editor, Vol. 8. Smithsonian Institution, Washington, D.C.

== See also ==
- Native Americans in California
- Chinigchinix
- Population of Native California
- Bibliography of California history
