= Luiseño (disambiguation) =

Luiseño may refer to:

- the Luiseño people
- the Luiseño language
- Luiseño traditional narratives
- USS Luiseno (ATF-156)
