= Luiseño traditional narratives =

Topic listing

Luiseño traditional narratives include myths, legends, tales, and oral histories preserved by the Luiseño people of southwestern California.

Luiseño oral literature is very similar to that of the Luiseño's Takic-speaking relatives to the north and east, and also to that of their Yuman neighbors to the south. Particularly prominent are several versions of the Southern California Creation Myth. (See also Traditional narratives (Native California).)

== Online examples of Luiseño narratives ==
- Chinigchinich by Jerónimo Boscana (ca. 1825)
- "A Saboba Origin-Myth" by George Wharton James (1902)
- "The Legend of Tauquitch and Algoot" by George Wharton James (1903)
- "Two Myths of the Mission Indians of California" by Alfred L. Kroeber (1906)
- "Mythology of the Mission Indians" (1) by Constance Goddard DuBois (1906)
- "Mythology of the Mission Indians" (2) by Constance Goddard DuBois (1906)
- The North American Indian by Edward S. Curtis (1926)

== Sources for Luiseño narratives ==
- Applegate, Richard B. 1979. "The Red, the Black, and the White: Duality and Unity in the Luiseño Cosmos. Journal of California and Great Basin Anthropology 1:71–88. (Analysis of structural patterns in myths.)
- Boscana, Gerónimo. 1933. Chinigchinich. Edited by John Peabody Harrington. Fine Arts Press, Santa Ana, California. (Boscana translation taken from Robinson 1846, with extensive ethnographic notes by Harrington; San Juan Capistrano creation myths.)
- Curtis, Edward S. 1907–1930. The North American Indian. 20 vols. Plimpton Press, Norwood, Massachusetts. (Three myths, vol. 15, pp. 101–106.)
- DuBois, Constance Goddard. 1904. "Mythology of the Mission Indians". Journal of American Folklore 17:185–188. (La Jolla version of the creation myth.)
- DuBois, Constance Goddard. 1906. "Mythology of the Mission Indians. Journal of American Folklore 19:52–60. (Versions of the creation myth from José Albáñez and Juan de Dios.)
- DuBois, Constance Goddard. 1908. "Ceremonies and Traditions of the Diegueño Indians". Journal of American Folklore 21:228-236. (Brief notes on creation myth.)
- DuBois, Constance Goddard. 1908. "The Religion of the Luiseño Indians of Southern California". University of California Publications in American Archaeology and Ethnology 8:69–173. Berkeley. (Several myths, pp. 128–157.)
- Gifford, Edward Winslow. 1918. "Clans and Moieties in Southern California". University of California Publications in American Archaeology and Ethnology 14:155–219. Berkeley. (Brief myth from Canuat of Soboba recorded in 1916–1917, p. 212.)
- Gifford, Edward Winslow, and Gwendoline Harris Block. 1930. California Indian Nights. Arthur H. Clark, Glendale, California. (Two previously published narratives, pp. 102–105, 182.)
- Harrington, John Peabody. 1934. A New Original Version of Boscana's Historical Account of the San Juan Capistrano Indians of Southern California. Smithsonian Miscellaneous Collections No. 92(4). Washington, D.C. (Translation of the version of Boscana's account later published by Reichlen and Reichlen in 1971; San Juan Capistrano creation myths.)
- James, George Wharton. 1902. "A Saboba Origin-Myth". Journal of American Folklore 15:36–39. ("Literary" version of the Luiseño creation myth, from José Pedro Losero.)
- James, George Wharton. 1903. "The Legend of Tauquitch and Algoot". Journal of American Folklore 16:153–159. ("Literary" version of a Luiseño myth.)
- Kroeber, A. L. 1906. "Two Myths of the Mission Indians of California". Journal of American Folklore 19:309–321. (Luiseño and Mohave myths, with comparative comments.)
- Kroeber, A. L. 1925. Handbook of the Indians of California. Bureau of American Ethnology Bulletin No. 78. Washington, D.C. (Several narratives, pp. 637–639, 676–680.)
- Laylander, Don. 2004. Listening to the Raven: The Southern California Ethnography of Constance Goddard DuBois. Coyote Press Archives of California Prehistory No. 51. Salinas, California. (Edition of DuBois' ethnographic articles, plus some unpublished material in notes.)
- Margolin, Malcolm. 1993. The Way We Lived: California Indian Stories, Songs, and Reminiscences. First edition 1981. Heyday Books, Berkeley, California. (A narrative, p. 118, from DuBois 1908.)
- Parker, Horace. 1965. The Historic Valley of Temecula: The Early Indians of Temecula. Paisano Press, Balboa Island, California. (Version of a migration legend, pp. 5–7.)
- Reichlen, Henry, and Paule Reichlen. 1971. "Le manuscrit Boscana de la Bibliothèque Nationale de Paris. Journal de la Société des Américanistes 60:233–273. (Original version of the Boscana manuscript published by Harrington in 1934.)
- Robinson, Alfred. 1846. Life in California During a Residence of Several years in that Territory. Wiley & Putnam, New York. (Contains a translation of the manuscript by Boscana with creation myths from San Juan Capistrano.)
- Sparkman, Philip Stedman. 1908. "A Luiseño Tale". Journal of American Folklore 21:35–36.
- Strong, William Duncan. 1929. "Aboriginal Society in Southern California". University of California Publications in American Archaeology and Ethnology 26:1–358. Berkeley. (Narrative from Francisco Ardea of Pala and comparative comments, pp. 284–285, 325–328.)
- True, Delbert L., and Clement W. Meighan. 1987. "Nahachish". Journal of California and Great Basin Anthropology 9:188–198. (Discussion of legends reported in DuBois 1908 and Parker 1965.)
