= Bill Vardoulis =

American politician

Bill Vardoulis held many distinguished titles throughout his public service. He was the mayor of Irvine, California in the late 1970s. He has held the post of President of the Irvine Chamber of Commerce, served on the Orange County Airport Land Use Commission, Director of the County Sanitation Districts of Orange County, and on the Orange County Transportation Commission.

An engineer educated at the University of Pittsburgh, he later received a master's degree in engineering at USC and an MBA from California State University, Long Beach. Vardoulis promoted the visionary plan for toll roads in 1980, which have now been nearly completed. He recently proposed a concept for an 11-mile transportation tunnel under the Cleveland National Forest that would connect the 133 Toll Road in Orange County to the I-15 Freeway in Riverside County. The roadways would actually include three tunnels which could also carry rail traffic, a water transmission line, high-voltage transmission cables and other uses. Transportation agencies in Orange and Riverside Counties have done preliminary review of the concept and have put it on hold due to the potentially high cost at this point.

He was Vice President of Church Engineering, a Civil Engineering firm, prior to its sale in late 1992. He then founded BV Engineering where he was CEO until its sale in 2004. Vardoulis has received numerous awards, most notable the Irvine Citizen of the Year presented by the Chamber of Commerce, and the Visionary Award presented by the Transportation Corridor Agency for his planning for the Orange County Toll Roads.

Baseball was Vardoulis' favorite sport. As a boy, he sold newspapers at Forbes Field in Pittsburgh. He always remained a devoted Pittsburgh Pirates fan.

Bill Vardoulis died on September 1, 2021. He is survived by his wife Debra, two sons, and grandchildren.
