= Maynard Geiger =

Personal life
- Born: August 24, 1901
- Died: May 13, 1977 (aged 75)
- Notable work: biography of Junípero Serra

Religious life
- Religion: Catholic
- Order: Franciscan
- Ordination: June 9, 1929

Maynard J. Geiger, O.F.M., Ph.D. (August 24, 1901 – May 13, 1977) was an American Friar Minor and Roman Catholic priest, who was a major historian of the Spanish missions in California founded by the Franciscan Order.

== Life ==
He was born Joseph Geiger Jr. in Lancaster, Pennsylvania, in 1901 to Joseph Geiger and Katherine Kray. Twelve years later the family moved to Los Angeles. After graduating from Loyola High School there in 1919, he entered the seminary of the Friars Minor of California. He was received into the novitiate of the Order in 1923, and given the religious name of Maynard, keeping his birth name as a middle name. He received Holy Orders on June 9, 1929, at Mission Santa Barbara.

Geiger wrote extensively on various aspects of the mission system, and is best known for his biography of Junípero Serra, the first "Father Presidente" of the Alta California missions. He was a tireless advocate for the mission system and the evangelization of the native populations, choosing to highlight through his scholarship the achievements and dedication of the friars of California.

== See also ==
- Zephyrin Engelhardt
- St. John O'Sullivan
- Junípero Serra
