= Pine Creek Wilderness =

Protected wilderness area in California, United States

- IUCN category Ib (wilderness area)
- Location within southern California Location within California Location within the United States
- Interactive map of Pine Creek Wilderness
- Location: San Diego County, California, United States
- Nearest city: El Cajon, California
- Coordinates: 32°45′59.1906″N 116°35′52.9434″W
- Area: 13,261 acres (53.67 km^{2})
- Established: 1984
- Governing body: United States Forest Service

Pine Creek Wilderness is a wilderness area designated by Congress in 1984. It is located entirely in California, and managed by United States Forest Service as part of the Cleveland National Forest.

The wilderness is a sloping area of 13,261 acres (53.67 km^{2}), ranging from 2,000 ft (610 m) elevation in the south to 4,000 ft (1,200 m) in the north. It is situated entirely in California, bordered by the Hauser Wilderness to the south. Vegetation consists primarily of chaparral (dominated by chamise and scrub oak) with oak woodland along stream bottoms.

Wilderness permits are required for both day and overnight use.
