= Chinigchinix =

Mission Indians mythological figure

Chingichngish (also spelled Chengiichngech, Chinigchinix, Chinigchinich, Changitchnish, etc.), also known as Quaoar (also Qua-o-ar, Kwawar, etc.) and by other names including Ouiamot, Tobet and Saor, is an important mythological figure of the Mission Indians of coastal Southern California, a group of Takic-speaking peoples, today divided into the Payómkawichum (Luiseño), Tongva (Gabrieliño and Fernandeño), and Acjachemem (Juaneño) peoples.

Chinigchinix was born, or first appeared, after the death of Wiyot, a tyrannical ruler of the first beings, who was poisoned by his sons. Wiyot's murder brought death into the world, and as a consequence, the male creator Night divided the first human ancestors into distinct peoples, assigning them languages and territories.

In June 2002, 50000 Quaoar, a large trans-Neptunian object and ringed dwarf planet, was discovered and named after this deity.

== Names ==
The name Ouiamot is ostensibly similar to Wiyot (Ouiot), the name of another important figure, the primeval tyrant killed just before the appearance of Chinigchinix. Ouiamot is possibly to be taken as Ouiamot the childhood name of Chinigchinix.

The name Quaoar was first recorded by Hugo Reid in his 1852 description of Tongva, in the spelling Qua-o-ar. Quaoar's parents were Tacu and Auzar, or, according to other accounts, he was born of Tamaayawut (Mother Earth). According to yet other accounts, "He had neither father nor mother".

Both the Tongva religion and language are recorded only fragmentarily. As a consequence, the pronunciation of the name Quaoar is not known with certainty. Hugo Reid (1852) recorded it as Qua-o-ar, suggesting that it was trisyllabic. But the Spanish transcribed it Quaguar, suggesting two syllables ([ˈkwawaɾ], reflecting the Spanish use of gu for [w]). Kroeber (1925) spells it Kwawar, though he notes Reid's spelling as well: Kwawar (" Qua-o-ar "). Harrington (1933) gives the most precise transcription, K(w)áʼuwar, in interpreting an 1846 translation of a Spanish text.

Given the general quality of Harrington's work, this might be expected to be the most accurate as well, approximately [ˈkʷaʔuwar], with three syllables.

In English it is /ˈkwɑːwɑːr/, with two syllables.

== History ==
The Takic beliefs are known only fragmentarily, as these peoples were Christianized early, by Spanish missionaries, during the late 18th to early 19th centuries. Only sparse material has been collected by ethnologists from the few remaining native speakers during 19th century. Chingichngish has variously been represented as a creator deity, a culture hero or lawgiver figure or a "prophet", who became associated with the figure of Christ after the conversion of the Takic peoples.

This character was first mentioned in a description of the beliefs of the native peoples who were associated with the Mission San Juan Capistrano in accounts written by the Franciscan missionary Gerónimo Boscana in the 1820s. One version of Boscana's manuscript was subsequently published by Alfred Robinson (1846), who gave it "Chinigchinich" as a title. Some subsequent scholars have characterized Luiseño religion in general, or certain portions of it, or a set of some more widely shared traits, as a Chingichngish cult (DuBois 1908; Kroeber 1925; Moriarty 1969).

John Peabody Harrington (Boscana 1933) thought that Chingichngish might have been a historical figure, but most scholars have interpreted him as a deity. Alfred L. Kroeber (1925) suggested that Chingichngish beliefs were a historic-period native response to cultural shock of the missions, and Raymond C. White (1963) thought that they might have arisen in response to earlier contacts with European sailors along the California coast.

The most distinctive characteristic of Chingichngish beliefs concerned the existence of a set of "Chingichngish avengers" who spied on human beings and enforced the moral code. These figures included Raven, Rattlesnake, Bear, Mountain Lion, and others. There were also ceremonial items sacred to Chingichngish, including mortars and winnowing trays. Chingichngish beliefs were associated with the initiation ceremonies for adolescent boys, during which the hallucinogenic plant Datura (Toloache, Jimsonweed, Datura wrightii) was ingested, but elements of these ceremonies were much more widely shared than were belief in the specific character of Chingichngish.
