= Cleveland National Forest =

Southernmost National forest of California

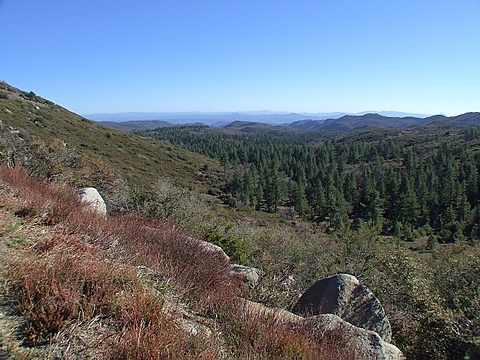
- Cleveland National Forest from Laguna Mountain
- Interactive map of Cleveland National Forest
- Location: San Diego / Riverside / Orange counties, California, United States
- Nearest city: Corona, California
- Coordinates: 33.3°N 116.8°W
- Area: 720 sq mi (1,900 km^{2})
- Named for: Grover Cleveland
- Governing body: U.S. Forest Service
- Website: Cleveland National Forest

Cleveland National Forest is a U.S. national forest in Southern California that encompasses 460,000 acres/720 mi^{2} (1,900 km^{2}) of inland montane regions. It is approximately 60 miles (97 km) from the Pacific Ocean, within the counties of San Diego, Riverside, and Orange. The landscape varies somewhat, with mostly chaparral canyons, arroyos and high desert, but dotted with meadows and oak and conifer forests. Near water sources, riparian environments and perennial aquatic plants attract native and migratory wildlife, such as at San Diego's man-made Lake Cuyamaca. A generally warm and dry, inland-Mediterranean climate prevails over the Forest, with the cooler months producing morning frost and snowfall (in the higher elevations). It is the southernmost U.S. National Forest of California. The area is administered by the U.S. Forest Service, a government agency within the United States Department of Agriculture, and is locally overseen by the Descanso, Palomar and Trabuco Ranger Districts.

== History ==
The Kumeyaay, Payómkawichum, Cahuilla, and Cupeño indigenous peoples long inhabited various areas of the Forest. As with many tribes in California, acorns were an important part of their diet. Many of Cleveland National Forest's trails are built following their traditional routes.

Cleveland National Forest was created on July 1, 1908, with the consolidation of Trabuco Canyon National Reserve and San Jacinto National Reserve by President Theodore Roosevelt and named after former President Grover Cleveland.

In 1964, a bid to reclaim 25 acres (10 ha) of the Forest was made by Acjachemen leader Clarence H. Lobo. After California Mission Indians were offered $29.1 Million Dollars by the US Federal Government in 1964 "to settle tribal land claims" regarding 70 million acres (280,000 km^{2}) of land, Lobo rejected this offer, since it valued an acre of native land at 47 cents and did not account for unratified treaties. Lobo responded by sending $12.50 to President Lyndon B. Johnson for 25 acres (10 ha) of Cleveland National Forest (at 50 cents per acre), and set up a camp at the site (the Upper San Juan Campground).

Cleveland National Forest was the site of the 2003 Cedar Fire, at its time it was the largest wildland fire in California history. Started when a lost hunter lit a fire to signal for help, the fire would go on to burn 273,246 acres, destroy 2,820 buildings, kill fourteen civilians and one firefighter, and injure an additional 113 people.

The Santiago Fire of 2007 burned 6,701 acres (2,712 ha) of the Forest, while subsequent fires that year burned thousands of acres more.

In 2024, the Airport Fire occurred in the northern part of the Forest, started by accident as a result of error during fire prevention measures. The fire burned 23,526 acres, with some injury and no deaths reported.

== Districts and geography ==
Cleveland National Forest consists of numerous discontiguous tracts of land, which are grouped into three ranger districts.

Trabuco Ranger District is the northernmost area, and covers most of the Santa Ana Mountains. It straddles the line between Orange and Riverside Counties, with a small portion extending into San Diego County north of Camp Pendleton; it is bisected by State Route 74. To the north, the district borders the city of Corona, which is home to the district office; it also borders Lake Elsinore and Wildomar to the east.

Palomar Ranger District is primarily located within northern San Diego County, with a small portion extending into Riverside County. The district encompasses Palomar Mountain State Park, and is adjacent to Lake Henshaw and Ramona, the latter of which houses the district office.

Descanso Ranger District is located entirely within San Diego County east of Alpine, which is home to the district office. It is bisected by Interstate 8 and surrounds numerous lakes and reservoirs administered by other agencies, including El Capitan Reservoir and Barrett Lake.

Sunrise Highway, which runs through the Descanso Ranger District, has been designated a National Forest Scenic Byway.

== Use restrictions ==
A National Forest Adventure Pass is required for parking in designated areas of Cleveland National Forest, as well as other National Forests in Southern California, and may be obtained from local merchants, visitor centers, or online.

Also updated on Cleveland National Forest's official site (under ‘Current Conditions’) are road, campground, picnic area, and trail closures.

"Law Enforcement Activities" is a common reason given for closures in the southern portion of the Forest. These closures are implemented to limit back road access, with the goal of circumnavigating US Border Patrol checkpoints. Bear Valley Road, coming up from Buckman Springs, Kitchen Creek Road and Thing Valley Road, are among routes that are routinely restricted.

Elevated fire restrictions were announced in August 2020.

== Activities ==
Popular activities include picnic areas, bird- and wildlife-watching, botanical tours, hiking, rock climbing, horseback riding, trail-running, mountain biking, camping or driving on the many mountain roads. The Forest also includes Corral Canyon (not to be confused with the area of the same name in Malibu) and Wildomar Off-Highway Vehicle Areas.

In addition to campers, hikers and wildlife advocates, forest rangers are also available to assist and accommodate the needs of local telecommunications and utilities companies, horseback riders, seasonal hunters, off-road vehicle enthusiasts, local farmers/ranchers, residents, neighbors and visitors alike.

=== Camping ===
- Campgrounds – Cleveland National Forest has campgrounds available at the Descanso, Palomar, and Trabuco Ranger District. Sites normally serve 6-8 persons and 2 vehicles.
  - Group camping – Group campgrounds are available.
  - Remote camping – Visitor's permits are required.

=== Hiking ===
The best season for hiking is during the cooler fall, winter, and spring months. Many trails travel through the open chaparral and get very hot in the summer. Summer hiking should be done in early morning hours on designated trails that offer shade.

Poison oak is found along most trails. Ticks can be a problem in the spring and early summer.

=== Observatories ===
- Mount Laguna Observatory

=== Fire lookout towers ===
There are currently two operational fire lookout towers in Cleveland National Forest.

- High Point Lookout, Cleveland National Forest, Palomar Mountain
- Los Pinos Lookout, Cleveland National Forest, near Lake Morena
- Boucher Hill Lookout: While this fire lookout tower is also on Palomar Mountain, it actually sits inside the Palomar Mountain State Park and not Cleveland National Forest. It is an operational tower and works in conjunction with the USFS but is owned by the State of California and is an historic building.

== Wilderness areas ==
There are 4 official wilderness areas in Cleveland National Forest that are part of the National Wilderness Preservation System. One of them extends into land that is managed by the Bureau of Land Management.

- Agua Tibia Wilderness (partly BLM)
- Hauser Wilderness
- Pine Creek Wilderness
- San Mateo Canyon Wilderness

== Flora and fauna ==
Cleveland National Forest is home to many wildlife species such as mountain lion, bobcat, mule deer, coyote, gray fox, ringtail cat, long-tailed weasel, opossum, black-tailed jackrabbits, desert cottontails, California ground squirrel, and many other small species. A wildlife corridor is being created between Cleveland National Forest and Orange County's wild coastal terrains to ensure that animals can retreat fire safely if needed.

== See also ==
- List of national forests of the United States
- California chaparral and woodlands
  - California montane chaparral and woodlands
  - California oak woodlands
