= National Forest Adventure Pass =

American recreation fee pass

The National Forest Adventure Pass is a recreation fee pass issued by the United States Forest Service that permits bearers in designated regions of four National Forests in Southern California to park their cars for the purpose of recreation. Though it was introduced during the "Recreation Fee Demonstration Program" (Fee-Demo) which ended on November 21, 2004, the Forest Service continues to administer the program, nearly unchanged, under the Federal Lands and Recreation Enhancement Act. This act, derisively dubbed by some as the "Recreation Access Tax" (RAT), was passed in December 2004 as part of the Omnibus Appropriations Bill. The four national forests it applies to are the Angeles National Forest, Cleveland National Forest, Los Padres National Forest and San Bernardino National Forest.

It is the local element of the controversial national Recreational Fee Demonstration Program system that imposes fees on the public to use public lands.

The Legislative Counsel of California has determined that the Forest Service may not cite cars for parking on state highways within national forests unless there is evidence that the occupants have used the forest for recreational purposes (for example, the occupants have been observed entering the forest). The Forest Service invites those who feel they have been cited unjustly to write to an address on the citation to appeal. This determination was made after a large number of incidents occurred where property owners were cited for parking on their own property, in communities completely contained in the San Bernardino National Forest.

Passes may be purchased for annual or day use online or from visitor centers and local merchants. Violators usually receive a "Notice of Noncompliance" and may clear the notice by purchasing a pass after the violation, paying online, or sending in a check or money order to the address in the envelope provided. Punishment of noncompliant individuals has been rare. In theory, use of the forests for non-recreational, First Amendment purposes does not require an Adventure Pass. In addition, using the restroom, stretching, or taking a picture is not a violation.

After passage of the Recreational Enhancement Act in 2004, Adventure Passes are now only required at designated High Impact Recreational Areas. However, in fact most areas that previously required a parking pass still require one. To avoid a fine, a wise hiker will telephone a Forest Service office or check the maps of High Impact Recreational Areas online of the individual forests to determine in advance his or her permit needs, since adequate signage pertaining to the need for an Adventure Pass is not yet common. Although supposedly many areas do not require the pass, most of these locations are less convenient to populated areas and can be accessed only from areas that do require a pass.

Fees collected via purchases of the Adventure Pass/Notice of Required Fee help directly fund the recreation program on each of the forests involved which includes purchasing trash bags, toilet paper, paint, wood for picnic tables, campfire rings, stoves, etc. as well as salary funding to hire rangers to care for the forest, clean bathrooms, pick up trash, answer visitor questions, enforce regulations, and serve the public. The proceeds from these fees stay local and do not go back into a central, national fund.

== Controversy ==
The continued collection of fees for use of the National Forest Lands remains controversial since the 9th circuit court of appeals ruled in February 2012 in the case Adams v. U.S. Forest Service, that "The Federal Lands Recreation Enhancement Act ("REA")", the authority under which the fee structure was enacted, "prohibits the United States Forest Service from charging fees "[s]olely for parking". In spite of this clear prohibition, what many consider to be "parking only" fees are still required at numerous locations in the San Bernardino and Angeles National Forests as well as other National Forest Locations.

The ruling stated that while fees are allowed in certain instances, the "fee" sites must conform to the following requirements as listed below:

- (A) that provides significant opportunities for outdoor recreation;
- (B) that has substantial Federal investments;
- (C) where fees can be efficiently collected; and
- (D) that contains all of the following amenities:
- (i) Designated developed parking.
- (ii) A permanent toilet facility.
- (iii) A permanent trash receptacle.
- (iv) Interpretive sign, exhibit, or kiosk.
- (v) Picnic tables.
- (vi) Security services.

The Forest Service "maintains that the latter part of § 6802(d)(1)(A), which prohibits fees "solely for . . . picnicking along roads or trailsides," clearly permits fees for road or trailside picnics that take place within a larger area (delineated by the Forest Service) if that larger area offers amenities".

The Court rejected such an interpretation of the REA statute stating:

"Because this reading is so illogical, we will consider another interpretation of the agency's position. Perhaps the Forest Service is really saying that a fee is "[s]olely for parking" when imposed in a location where a visitor has no option to do something else, whether or not that "something else" is an amenity required by the statute."

The Court further went on to illustrate:

"Consider what would happen if a restaurant-goer inspected his bill and noticed an unexpected charge. If told that the fee was for ten bottles of wine that the patron's group neither ordered nor drank, the patron would rightly be outraged. He would not find much solace in a waiter's explanation that the wine cellar contained ten bottles, which the patron could have ordered if he wished."

The Court clarified the motive behind such reasoning:

"By ignoring the plain text, the Forest Service arrives at an interpretation that would enable an end-run around the clear statutory restrictions. If the REA gave the agency complete discretion to dictate a fee's so-called purpose, then the agency could entirely evade the prohibition on parking fees by simply declaring that its fees are "for" something else too. At any of the places where subsection (f) contemplates recreation fees, it is possible for a visitor to do something more than park a car—take photos of a volcano, make a cell phone call, chew a piece of gum—and a visitor must use a facility or service to be subject to a subsection (g) fee. Therefore, the agency could simply say that its parking fee is also "for" those other activities. Because the REA has a plain meaning that does not lead to an absurd result, we have no need to afford deference to the agency's competing, nonsensical interpretation."

The court then concluded:

"...the REA unambiguously prohibits the Forest Service from charging fees... for recreational visitors who park a car, then camp at undeveloped sites, picnic along roads or trailsides, or hike through the area without using the facilities and services."

In spite of this ruling the fees continue to be collected.

== See also ==
- Interagency Pass
