= Bobbie Banda =

Native American tribal elder (1947–2013)

Barbara "Bobbie" Lucille Banda
- Born: 1947
- Died: May 4, 2013 (aged 65–66)
- Occupations: Juaneño tribal leader and activist
- Known for: Introducing Native American curriculum into public school system around San Juan Capistrano, California

Barbara "Bobbie" Lucille Banda (c. 1947 – May 4, 2013) was an American Juaneño tribal elder, activist, and a member of the Juaneño Band of Mission Indians. Banda successfully championed efforts to introduction Native American curriculum, including Juaneño language courses, into the public school systems around San Juan Capistrano, California, during the 1970s. The curriculum is still taught in California public schools today.

Banda was a ninth-generation member of the Rios family. The Rio family has lived in the area since before the establishment of the Mission San Juan Capistrano in 1776. Banda was raised in the Little Hollywood neighborhood, located within San Juan Capistrano's Los Rios Street Historic District. She attended the city's San Juan Elementary School. Banda was a member of the now defunct Capistrano Union High School class of 1964, which was the last class to graduate from the high school.

Banda was hired by the Capistrano Unified School District as a teacher's aide immediately after her high school graduation. She later worked for Endevco Aerospace for twenty-eight years.

Bobbie Banda actively campaigned for the creation of Native American courses and programs at the Capistrano Unified School District during the 1970s. She successfully lobbied for U.S. federal funding to establish the educational programs. The programs created by Banda represented a major step toward Native American education in Southern California. The programs, led by her son, Nathan Banda, are still taught as part of the curriculum today.

Banda was active in Juaneño politics as well. She served as the co-director of the Juaneño Band of Mission Indians' elders committee for six years, until her death in May 2013. In 2013, Banda campaigned on behalf of the six candidates for the Juaneño tribal council. All six candidates endorsed by Banda were elected, leading to the first all female tribal council in Juaneño history.

Banda was married to her husband, Frank, for 48 years at the time of her death. The couple had four children: Frank Jr., Monica Clifton, Erika Zammoron and Nathan. She died from a series of strokes on May 4, 2013, at the age 66. Her funeral was held at the Mission Basilica San Juan Capistrano.
