= St. John O'Sullivan =

American Catholic priest (1874–1933)

The Right Reverend St. John O'Sullivan
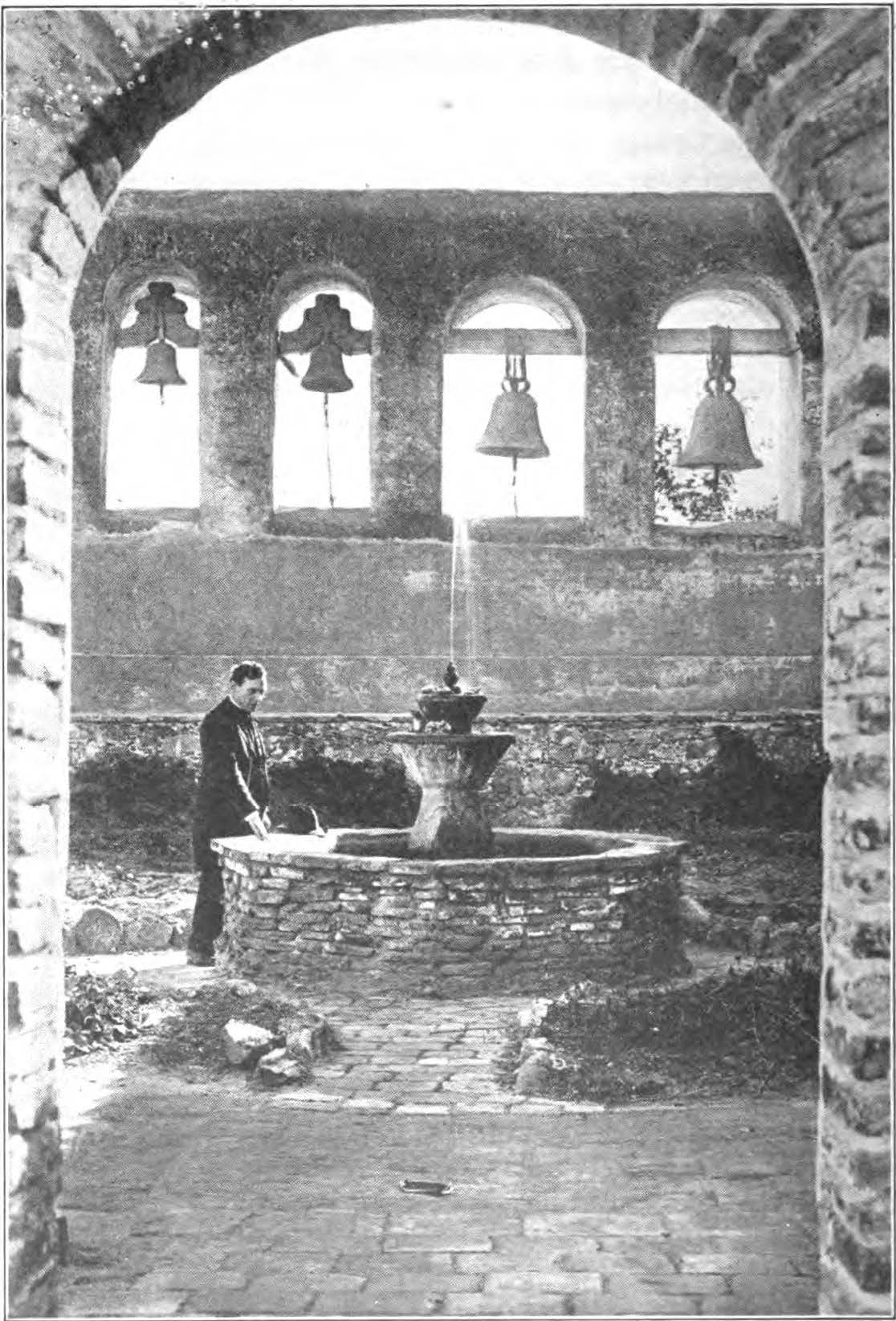
- St. John O'Sullivan in the courtyard of Mission San Juan Capistrano
- Born: March 19, 1874; Louisville, Kentucky
- Died: July 22, 1933 (aged 59); Orange, California

St. John O'Sullivan (pronounced "sin-jin") (1874 –1933) was a Catholic priest who personally undertook the restoration of the old Mission San Juan Capistrano in California.

== Early life ==
O'Sullivan was born in Louisville, Kentucky on March 19, 1874. He then attended the University of Notre Dame in Indiana. While at the university, he became determined to become a priest, and was accepted by his home Diocese of Louisville. He enrolled in Saint Bernard's Seminary in Rochester, New York, to do his theological studies, graduating in 1904, when he was ordained by the Bishop of Louisville, William George McCloskey.

== Mission San Juan Capistrano ==
Within months of his ordination, O'Sullivan was diagnosed as suffering from tuberculosis, and advised that his prognosis was poor. He decided to seek a drier climate in order to cope better with the disease and, with his bishop's permission, moved to the American Southwest. He helped in various parishes in Texas and Arizona. In this way, he came to know the Rev. Alfred Quetu, the Catholic pastor of Prescott, Arizona. The pastor suggested that the abandoned Mission San Juan Capistrano in California might provide him a place for O'Sullivan to exercise his ministry in a manner compatible with his health. O'Sullivan traveled to the Mission, where he fell in love with the site.

O'Sullivan was put in charge of the ruined Mission on July 5, 1910, making him the first priest to be resident at the mission since 1886. He set up a tent in the ruins of the mission, where he lived and began to minister to the local community. With a vision of how the Mission had looked in its heyday, he led restoration efforts at the Mission while he recovered. Working with his own hands, he began the restoration of the church, carving new beams and plastering and repairing the old walls. As the Mission began to regain its former glory, the priest found that his health was improving.

== Honours and legacy ==
In 1918 the Mission was given parochial status by the Bishop of Monterey-Los Angeles, John Joseph Cantwell, with O'Sullivan named as its first pastor in modern times. He was later named a Supernumerary Privy Chamberlain by the Holy See, entitled to be addressed as "Monsignor". O'Sullivan wrote Little Chapters About San Juan Capistrano in 1912, and in 1930 co-authored Capistrano Nights: Tales of a California Mission Town with Charles Francis Saunders and Charles Percy Austin.

O'Sullivan died in Orange, California, in 1933 and was buried in Calvary Cemetery in the East Los Angeles neighborhood of the city. On November 7, 1934, his remains were re-interred in the cemetery of the old Mission, adjacent to the Serra Chapel which he had helped to rebuild, where they rest today. The O'Neill Museum was created at the Mission and serves headquarters of the San Juan Capistrano Historical Society and the repository of all its archives.

== See also ==
- Zephyrin Engelhardt
- Maynard Geiger
- Junípero Serra
