= Clarence H. Lobo =

Clarence Henry Lobo
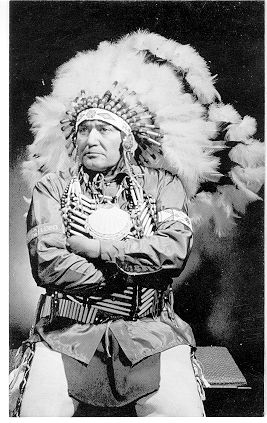
- Clarence H. Lobo (1912-1985), elected spokesperson of the Juaneño Band of Mission Indians (Acjachemen) from 1946 to 1985.
- Born: September 12, 1912
- Died: July 1, 1985
- Occupation: Juaneño Band of Mission Indians tribal spokesperson
- Known for: Native American activism

Clarence H. Lobo (c. September 12, 1912 – July 1, 1985) was the elected spokesperson for the Juaneño Band of Mission Indians from 1946 to 1985. He notably made a bid to reclaim 25 acres of the Cleveland National Forest as an act rejecting the $29.1 Million Dollar offer by the U.S. Federal Government "to settle tribal land claims" in 1964, which valued Native land at 47 cents an acre. He opposed the actions of the Bureau of Indian Affairs (BIA).

The Clarence Lobo Elementary School in San Clemente was opened in 1994, notably being the first school in the state of California to be named in honor of a Native American.

== Life ==
He was born in San Juan Capistrano on September 12, 1912. He grew up on the city's historic Los Rios Street, born to John Edward Lobo and Esperanza Robles. His great, great, great grandfather was Juan Antonio, a Cahuilla leader, who had married with the Lobo family in the early nineteenth century. His grandfather had brought Walnut trees to the San Juan Capistrano area that were uprooted for orange groves.

He attended San Juan Elementary School and Capistrano Unified High School. During his time at the high school, he came to realized that Native Americans were made invisible by the public education system. Later in his life, he would express the difficulties of teaching his children about Native people's history, describing it as a "nasty and distasteful task."

He worked as a heavy-equipment operator, moving unearthed native artifacts out of the way of development whenever he came upon them.

In 1944, a lawsuit brought by the Indigenous peoples of California against the U.S. government resulted in $17 million in compensation for the groups involved. The court set aside $5 million in a trust "for benefits as needed," which left Lobo's people with $150 in cash each.

=== Elected spokesperson ===
In 1946, Lobo traveled on a motorcycle with his wife Bess, who had lineage with Taos Pueblo, to Sacramento as a representative of the Juaneño Band of Mission Indians (Acjachemen). He was elected spokesperson for the tribe that same year, at the age of 34.

Lobo wore a full headdress, even though this was not customary for Indigenous peoples of California. His rationale for doing so was because he believed he would not be taken seriously as a leader otherwise.

In 1951, he spoke at a local Rotary Club how "a series of treaties signed in the 1850s between the US government and California's Indian tribes had left out the Juaneno, making them ineligible for their own reservation or to get compensated for land." This lack of federal recognition has remained a major issue for the tribe, who are left without a land base and without rights to their ancestral remains and property.

In 1963, Lobo represented the Juaneño Band of Mission Indians in a lawsuit against the United States The Mission Indians of California vs. The United States, arguing that Native people's lands were illegally stolen in 1848.

In 1964, Lobo ran for presidency of the revived Mission Indian Federation (MIF), and supported its stance against the Bureau of Indian Affairs (BIA), stating that it kept the "Indian in bondage by teaching generation after generation how to be totally dependent on government."

=== 1964 Cleveland Forest Reclamation Bid ===
After California Mission Indians were offered $29.1 Million Dollars by the US Federal Government in 1964 "to settle tribal land claims" regarding 70 million acres of land, Lobo rejected this offer, since it valued an acre of native land at 47 cents and did not account for how California native's had lost this land through unratified treaties. In reference to this, Lobo stated "By nature my people are trusting to the point of being gullible. California was admitted to the Union in 1850 on a rental basis, and we’re asking the government to buy it back honorably, if they want it."

Lobo responded by sending $12.50 to US President Johnson for 25 acres of the Cleveland National Forest, and set up a camp at the site (the Upper San Juan Campground). This site was referred to in an article by the Los Angeles Times as the village site of Piwiva. Rather than money, Lobo spoke how native people wanted land returned to them. Lobo's trailer was burglarized and vandalized while he was at work in town. President Johnson sent the $12.50 back to Lobo and was told to direct his claim to the Forest Service regional office in San Francisco, where no one responded to his inquiry.

In a 1964 interview with the Los Angeles Times, Lobo spoke how the US Senate Act of 1891 that established the Mission Indian Commission, was supposed to provide native people with 640 acres of land after it had been lost to white settlers in the 1850s, but that the act was broken, like many before: "it is apparently just another treaty made to be broken in the long history of whites take over Indian's lands. Maybe now we can see if the federal government will finally live up to its word."

=== Later life ===
In 1972, after the American Indian Movement occupied the Bureau of Indian Affairs office in Washington, D.C., Lobo stated that the occupation "could not do the Indian cause any good."

He moved to Oroville, California, in 1975, where one of his sons had settled.

Shortly before his death in 1985, Lobo still routinely visited his hometown. On July 1, 1985, Lobo died at the age of 72 in Oroville, California.

== Legacy ==
The Clarence Lobo Elementary School in San Clemente was opened in September 1994. It made history as the first school in California to be named after a Native American. About 300 people attended the opening of the school. The elementary put out the statement, "The elementary school named posthumously for Clarence Lobo on land that was once his people’s should continue to remind the future generations of the positive impact an individual with commitment to a cause can make."

In 1996, the University of California, Irvine (UCI), dedicated a Lobo Day Celebration to honor his life. An Indigenous People's Day acknowledgement in 2022 by the School of Social Sciences referenced his words that were made in protest over the erasure of Juaneño Band of Mission Indians presence while standing at the construction site of the UCI campus in 1963: "Our children shall not know the experience of roaming over these rolling hills and listening to the wild birds as they talk to nature. Our footprints upon the sands of time shall be history to them."
