= San Mateo Canyon Wilderness =

Protected wilderness area in California, United States

- IUCN category Ib (wilderness area)
- Interactive map of San Mateo Canyon Wilderness
- Location: Orange County/San Diego County/Riverside County California
- Nearest city: Lake Elsinore, California
- Coordinates: 33°32′35″N 117°26′15″W
- Established: 1984
- Governing body: United States Forest Service

San Mateo Canyon is a 39,419 acres (160 km^{2}) wilderness area in the Cleveland National Forest of Southern California. It was established by the California Wilderness Act of 1984 and is administered by the United States Forest Service. The area is mostly chaparral and coastal sage scrub with oak woods at the lower elevations.
