= Henrietta Schmerler =

American anthropology graduate student and murder victim

Henrietta Schmerler (1909–1931) was an American anthropology graduate student at Columbia University, who was murdered during a solo fieldwork assignment on the White Mountain Apache Reservation in Arizona. Despite her limited experience, she was sent to conduct independent research, where her work focused on documenting cultural practices of the White Mountain Apache tribe. Schmerler's death prompted both public scrutiny and institutional deflection, with prominent anthropologists Ruth Benedict and Franz Boas blaming her perceived inexperience and alleged misconduct rather than addressing systemic failures. Her story became a cautionary tale, entangled in narratives of victim-blaming and gendered stereotypes, while also serving as a flashpoint for discussions about the responsibilities of academic institutions in ensuring the safety of researchers. Decades later, scholars revisited her case as emblematic of anthropology's struggles with power dynamics, ethical accountability, and the treatment of sexual violence within the field.
