= Constance Goddard DuBois =

American novelist and ethnographer

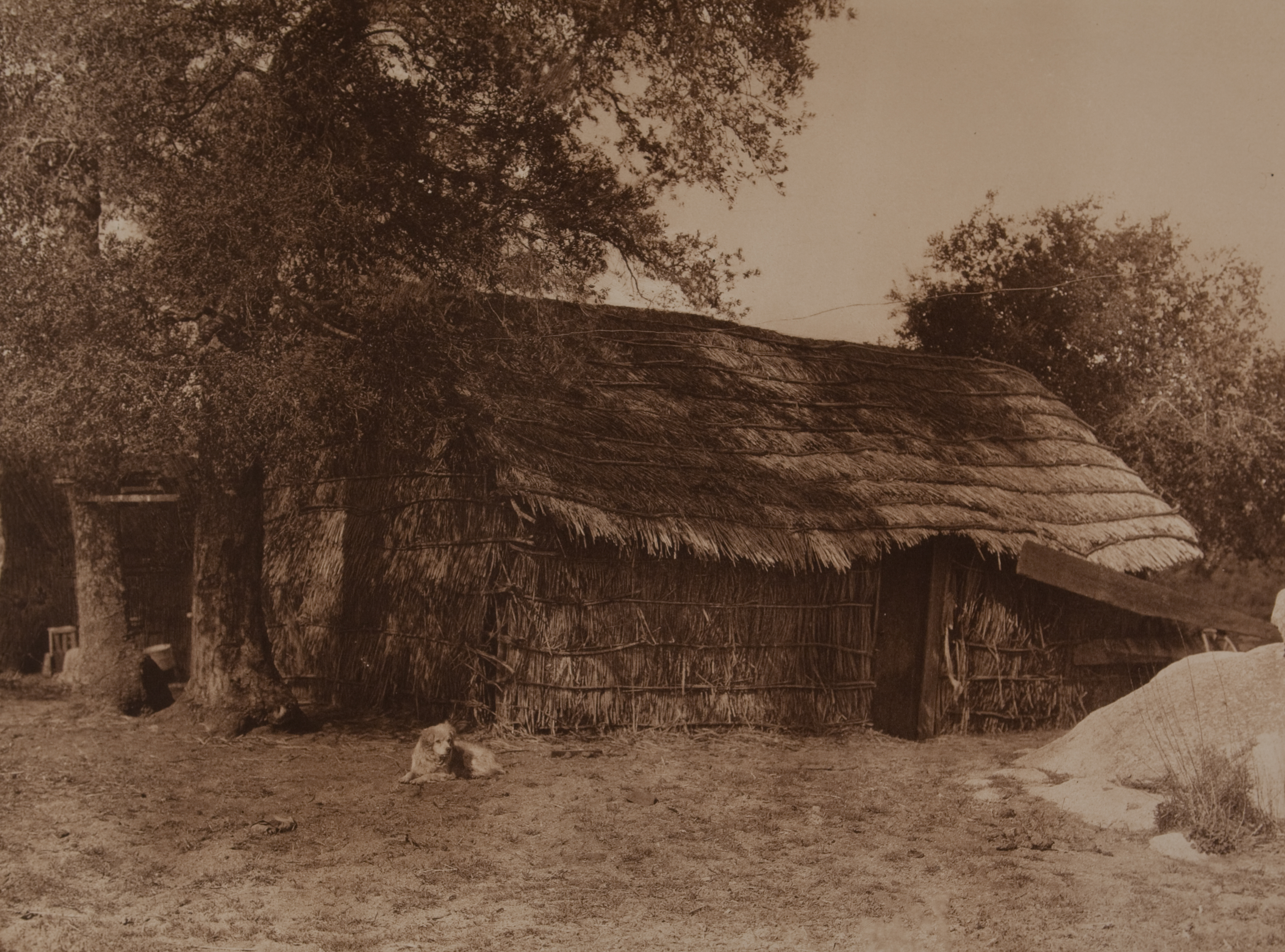
A Diegueno home

Constance Goddard DuBois (died 1934) was an American novelist and an ethnographer, writing extensively between 1899 and 1908 about the native peoples and cultures of southern California.

DuBois was born in Zanesville, Ohio, and settled in Waterbury, Connecticut, in 1889. Her published fiction included several short stories plus six novels (DuBois 1890, 1892, 1895a, 1895b, 1900, 1907).

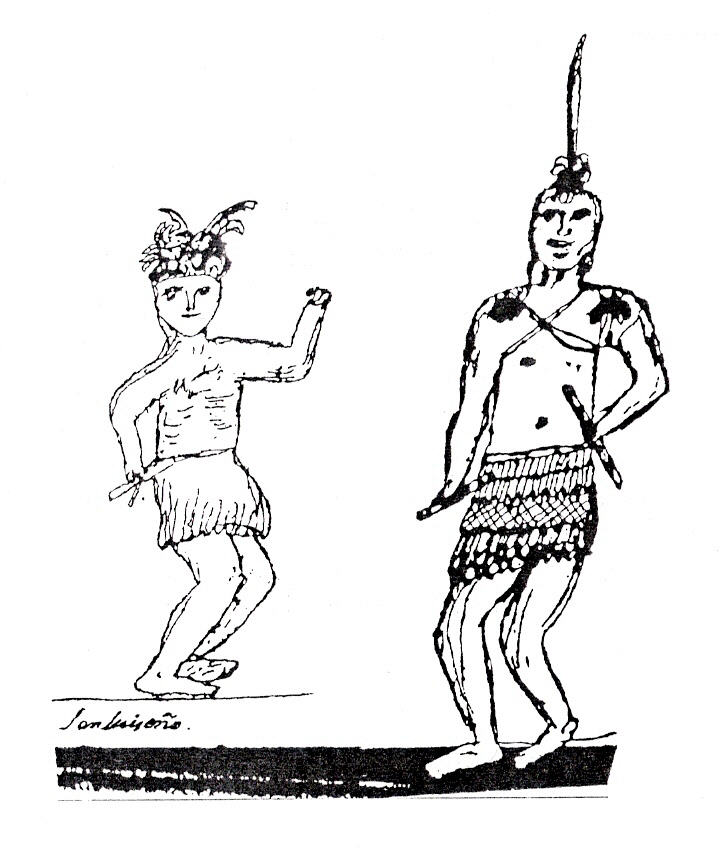
A Luiseno drawing by Pablo Tac, a Luiseno who lived at Mission San Luis Rey in the 1820s and 1830s, from Mission San Juan Capistrano: A Pocket History and Tour Guide p. 5.

DuBois' most enduring contribution was as a self-taught ethnographer, doing pioneering studies in a period when professional academic anthropology was just becoming established in the United States. Starting in the late 1890s, she made summer trips out west to see her sister who lived in the San Diego area. She began making treks into the San Diego backcountry, to meet the surviving communities of Diegueño and Luiseño Indians. Soon she was writing about their traditional and contemporary lifeways, promoting traditional crafts (particularly basketry), and helping with financial and political assistance.

DuBois' longest ethnographic work was a detailed monograph on "The Religion of the Luiseño Indians of Southern California" (1908), edited by Alfred L. Kroeber. In addition, she published 23 shorter articles about the region's native peoples, with particular emphases on their mythology, ceremonies, and crafts (Laylander 2004). Her manuscript papers are on file at Cornell University, and the San Diego Museum of Man has a collection of her photographs.

== Research ==
In her 1904 paper, The Story of the Chaup: A Myth of the Diegueños, Constance Goddard Du Bois presents a detailed transcription and interpretation of a myth central to the Diegueño people of Southern California. The story revolves around two brothers, Chaup, who embody both human and supernatural qualities, and their journey through trials, family conflicts, and acts of creation and destruction. The narrative explores themes of kinship, betrayal, and revenge, with the brothers navigating moral and physical challenges that involve hunting, confronting mythical creatures, and interacting with their community. Du Bois situates the myth within the broader cultural and spiritual framework of the Diegueño people, emphasizing the role of storytelling in preserving indigenous heritage. The paper also includes songs integral to the myth, demonstrating their function in ritual and oral tradition. This work reflects Du Bois's commitment to documenting and analyzing Native American folklore during a time when such traditions were increasingly under threat from assimilation policies.

In her 1905 paper, Religious Ceremonies and Myths of the Mission Indians, Constance Goddard Du Bois documented the sacred ceremonies, myths, and social practices of the Diegueño and Luiseño tribes of Southern California. Du Bois described key rituals such as the Toloache initiation, where boys consumed the hallucinogenic plant toloache (Datura) in a rite of passage to adulthood, and the Image fiesta, a ceremony to honor deceased ancestors. She emphasized the secrecy surrounding these practices, a response to colonial and missionary efforts to suppress indigenous culture. Du Bois also explored the tribes' mythologies, including creation stories and narratives that explain ritual origins, and highlighted how cultural exchange shaped the traditions of neighboring tribes. This work was among the early anthropological studies aiming to preserve Native American cultural practices amid the pressures of assimilation.

== Works ==
- Martha Corey: A Tale of the Salem Witchcraft. A. C. McClurg, Chicago, 1890.
- Columbus and Beatriz. A. C. McClurg, Chicago, 1892.
- The Shield of the Fleur de Lis: A Novel. Merriam, New York, 1895
- A Modern Pagan: A Novel. Merriam, New York, 1895
- A Soul in Bronze: A Novel of Southern California. H. S. Stone, Chicago, 1900.
- "The Raven of Capistrano: A True Wonder Tale". Out West 26:430-437, 537–544, 27:57-64, 152–157, 227–233, 343–351, 415–421, 523-531 (1907).
- "The Religion of the Luiseño Indians of Southern California". University of California Publications in American Archaeology and Ethnology 8:69-166 (1908).
