= Zephyrin Engelhardt =

German-born Roman Catholic priest and clerical historian

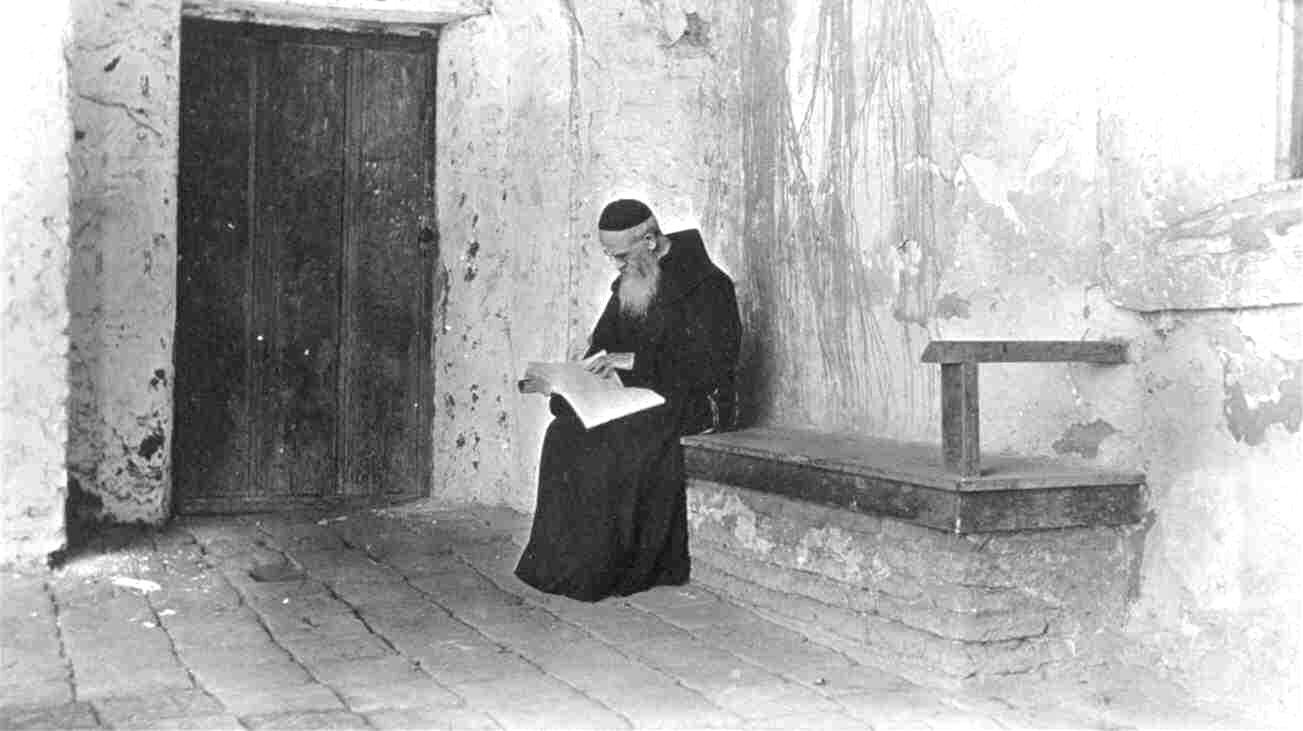
Father Engelhardt visited Mission San Juan Capistrano in 1915.

Zephyrin Engelhardt, O.F.M., (born Charles Anthony Engelhardt; 1851–1934) was a German-born Roman Catholic priest and clerical historian of the Franciscan Order.

== Life ==
Charles Anthony Engelhardt was born November 13, 1851, in Bilshausen, Hanover, Germany to Anthony and Elizabeth Engelhardt. His father was skilled in the manufacture of willowware. In 1852, the family emigrated to Covington, Kentucky. Charles was educated at St Francis Seraph College in Cincinnati, Ohio. He entered the Franciscan order in 1872 and was ordained in 1878. After ordination, Father Engelhardt taught for a year at St. Joseph's College, Cleveland, Ohio before becoming a missionary to the Menominee people in Wisconsin.

In 1887, Engelhardt went to New York, where he served as editor of the Weekly Pilgrim of Palestine. The next two years, he was a missionary in Mendocino County, California. From 1894 to 1900, he was superior of the missions in northern Michigan and of the Indian Boarding School at Harbor Springs, Michigan. In 1895, he founded and was editor of Anishinabe Enamiad. In 1900, he took charge of the Indian boarding school at Banning, California. The St. Boniface Indian Industrial School opened in 1890, providing vocational education to Cahuilla, Serrano, Luiseño, Kumeyaay, and other American Indians.

Engelhardt, known as the "Father of Mission History", compiled extensive histories of the twenty-one Spanish missions in Alta California as well as other Franciscan settlements in Baja California and Arizona during the first decades of the 20th century. Engelhardt's work is today considered to be the standard authority regarding California mission history. He also wrote a number of articles for the Catholic Encyclopedia.

== Works ==
- The Franciscans in California, (1897).
- The Franciscans in Arizona, (1899).
- The Missions and Missionaries of California, (1916).
- San Diego Mission, (1920).
- San Luis Rey Mission, (1921).
- Santa Barbara Mission, (1923).

Engelhardt also worked with the Pomo Native Americans of Northern California and compiled the vocabulary of their language.
