= Gerónimo Boscana =

19th-century Franciscan missionary

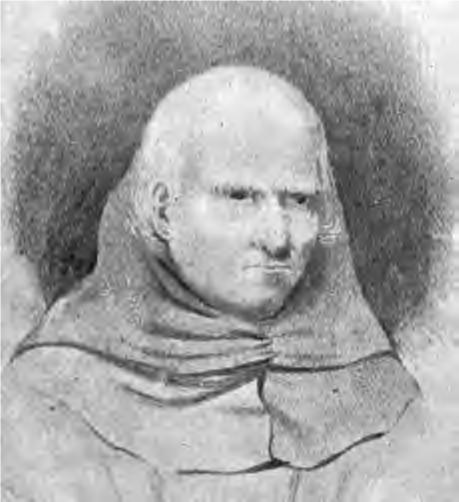
Father Gerónimo Boscana

Gerónimo Boscana (Jerónimo Boscana) was an early 19th-century Franciscan missionary in Spanish Las Californias and Mexican Alta California. He is noted for producing the most detailed ethnographic picture of a Native Californian culture to come out of the missionary period, an account that "for his time and profession, is liberal and enlightened" (Kroeber 1959:282).

== Life ==
Born at Llucmajor on the island of Mallorca, Spain in 1775 (Geiger 1969:29). Boscana was educated at Palma, joined the Franciscan order in 1792, and was ordained in 1799. He traveled to New Spain in 1803 and to Alta California in 1806. He served at the missions of Soledad, La Purísima, San Luis Rey, and San Gabriel. For more than a decade, from 1814 to 1826, he was stationed at Mission San Juan Capistrano. He died at Mission San Gabriel in 1831, and is the only missionary to be interred in its cemetery among over 2,000 other mission inhabitants, mainly Gabrielino or Tongva Indians, buried there.

== Ethnographic studies ==
Boscana's first ethnographic contribution resulted from an 1812 questionnaire sent by the Spanish government in Cádiz to the missionaries of Alta California (Geiger and Meighan 1976). The task of helping his colleague, José Barona, to prepare a response in 1814 on behalf of Mission San Juan Capistrano may have stimulated the missionary's interest in the native culture.

While at San Juan Capistrano, Boscana composed at least two versions of a detailed ethnographic sketch of the Juaneño or Acagchemem Native Americans, who were primarily speakers of a dialect of the Luiseño language but probably also included Gabrieliño or Tongva speakers from the north. A translation of one version of Boscana's manuscript, "Chinigchinich; a Historical Account of the Origin, Customs, and Traditions of the Indians at the Missionary Establishment of St. Juan Capistrano, Alta California Called The Acagchemem Nation," was published by Alfred Robinson in 1846 as an appendix to his book Life in California. Robinson was apparently responsible for giving the title "Chinigchinix (Chinigchinich)" to Boscana's work. An edition of this version with extensive annotations by the anthropologist and linguist John Peabody Harrington was published in 1933.

The following year, Harrington published a translation of another, variant version of Boscana's account, newly discovered in France and entitled "Relación histórica de la creencia, usos, costumbres, y extravagancias de los indios de esta Misión de San Juan Capistrano llamada la nación Acagchemem" (Harrington 1934). This version was subsequently also published in its original Spanish by Henry and Paula Reichlen in 1971. It seems to have been an earlier draft of the manuscript published by Robinson, but it contains some material not included in the later version.

Portions of a still earlier draft made by Boscana, with some additional ethnographic information, have also been discovered by John R. Johnson in 2006.
