= Edzerza =

Edzerza is a surname. Notable people with the surname include:

- Alano Edzerza (born 1981), Canadian Tahltan artist and entrepreneur
- John Edzerza (1948–2011), Canadian politician
- Kelly Edzerza-Bapty (fl. from 2010), Canadian Tahltan architect
