= Tongva =

Indigenous people of Southern California

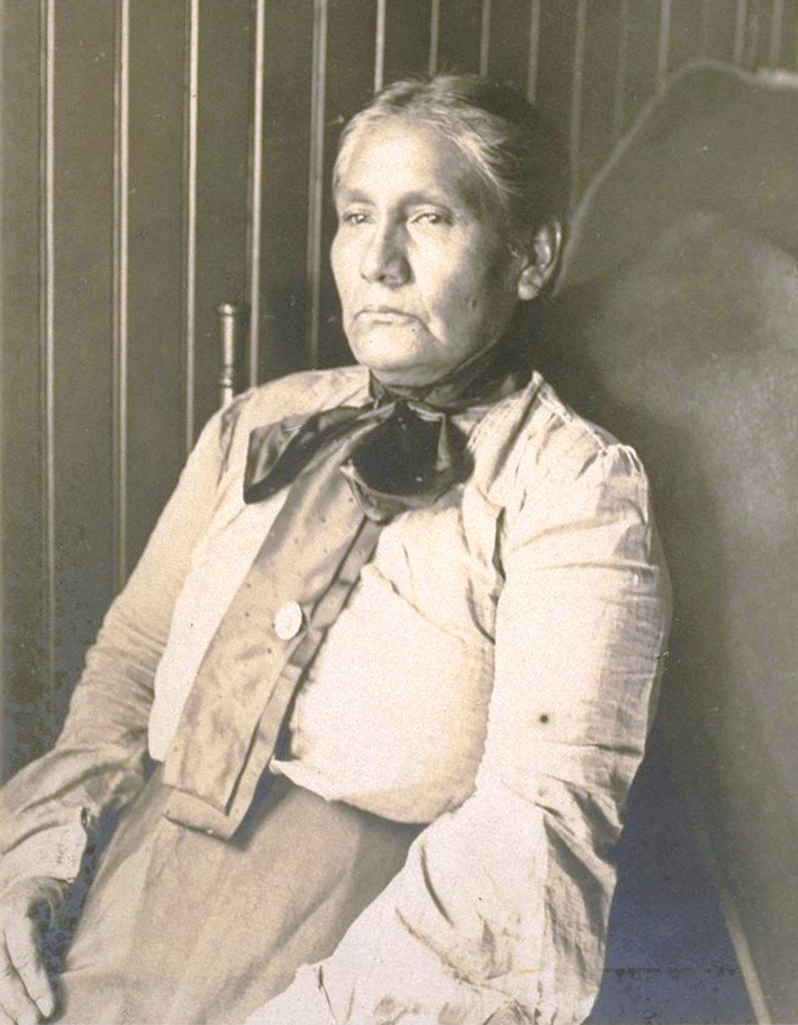
- Narcisa Higuera, photographed in 1905, was one of the last fluent Tongva speakers. An informant for ethnographer C. Hart Merriam, she was cited as the source of the widely used endonym Tongva.

Total population
- 3,900+ self-identified descendants

Regions with significant populations
- United States ( California)

Languages
- English, Spanish, formerly Tongva

Religion
- Indigenous religion, Christianity

Related ethnic groups
- Serrano, Kitanemuk, Tataviam, Vanyume

The Tongva (/ˈtɒŋvə/ TONG-və) are an indigenous people of California from the Los Angeles Basin and the Southern Channel Islands, an area covering approximately 4,000 square miles (10,000 km^{2}). In the precolonial era, the people lived in as many as 100 villages and primarily identified by their village rather than by a pan-tribal name. During colonization, the Spanish referred to these people as Gabrieleño and Fernandeño, (Note: Alternate spellings include Gabrielino and Fernardino.) names derived from the Spanish missions built on their land: Mission San Gabriel Arcángel and Mission San Fernando Rey de España. (Note: The Spanish did not always differentiate among communities or ethnic groups. For example, the Spanish referred to both the Tongva in the San Fernando Valley and the nearby Tataviam people, who spoke a different language, as "Fernandeño," because they were covered by that mission.) Tongva is the most widely circulated endonym among the people, used by Narcisa Higuera in 1905 to refer to inhabitants in the vicinity of Mission San Gabriel. Some people who identify as direct lineal descendants of the people advocate the use of their ancestral name Kizh as an endonym.

The Tongva, along with neighboring groups such as the Chumash, played an important role in the region's cultural and economic dynamics at the time of the European encounter. They had developed an extensive trade network through te'aats (plank-built boats). Their food and material culture was based on an Indigenous worldview that positioned humans as one strand in a web of life (as expressed in their creation stories). Over time, different communities came to speak distinct dialects of the Tongva language, part of the Takic subgroup of the Uto-Aztecan language family. There may have been five or more such languages (three on the southernmost Channel Islands and at least two on the mainland).

European contact was first made in 1542 by Spanish explorer Juan Rodríguez Cabrillo, who was greeted at Santa Catalina by people in a canoe. The following day, Cabrillo and his men entered a large bay on the mainland, which they named Baya de los Fumos ("Bay of Smokes") because of the many smoke fires they saw there. Indigenous peoples smoked their fish to preserve it. This is commonly believed to be San Pedro Bay, near present-day San Pedro.

The Gaspar de Portolá land expedition in 1769 resulted in the founding of Mission San Gabriel by Catholic missionary Junipero Serra in 1771. Under the mission system, the Spanish initiated an era of forced relocation and virtual enslavement of the peoples to secure their labor. In addition, the Native Americans were exposed to the Old World diseases endemic among the colonists. As they lacked any acquired immunity, the Native Americans suffered epidemics with high mortality, leading to the rapid collapse of Tongva society and lifeways.

They retaliated by way of resistance and rebellions, including an unsuccessful rebellion in 1785 by Nicolás José and the female chief Toypurina. In 1821, Mexico gained its independence from Spain and secularized the missions. They sold the mission lands, known as ranchos, to elite ranchers and forced the Tongva to assimilate. Most became landless refugees during this time.

In 1848, California was ceded to the United States following the Mexican-American War. The US government signed 18 treaties between 1851 and 1852 promising 8.5 million acres (3.4 million ha) of land for reservations. However, these treaties were never ratified by the Senate. The US had negotiated with people who did not represent the Tongva and had no authority to cede their land. During the following occupation by Americans, many of the Tongva and other Indigenous peoples were targeted with arrest. Unable to pay fines, they were used as convict laborers in a system of legalized slavery to expand the city of Los Angeles for Anglo-American settlers, who became the new majority in the area by 1880.

In the early 20th century, an extinction myth was purported about the Gabrieleño, who largely identified publicly as Mexican-American by this time. However, a close-knit community of the people remained in contact with one another between Tejon Pass and San Gabriel township into the 20th century. Since 2006, four organizations have claimed to represent the people:

- the Gabrielino-Tongva Tribe, known as the "hyphen" group from the hyphen in their name;
- the Gabrielino/Tongva Tribe, known as the "slash" group;
- the Kizh Nation (Gabrieleño Band of Mission Indians); and
- the Gabrieleño/Tongva Tribal Council.

Two of the groups, the hyphen and the slash group, were founded after a hostile split over the question of building an Indian casino. In 1994, the state of California recognized the Gabrielino "as the aboriginal tribe of the Los Angeles Basin." No organized group representing the Tongva has attained recognition as a tribe by the federal government. The lack of federal recognition has prevented self-identified Tongva descendants from having control over Tongva ancestral remains and artifacts, and has left them without a land base in the Tongva traditional homeland.

In 2008, more than 1,700 people identified as Tongva or claimed partial ancestry. In 2013, it was reported that the four Tongva groups that had applied for federal recognition had more than 3,900 members in total.

The Tongva Taraxat Paxaavxa Conservancy was established to campaign for the rematriation of Tongva homelands. In 2022, a 1-acre site was returned to the conservancy in Altadena, which marked the first time the Tongva had land in Los Angeles County in 200 years.

== Geography ==
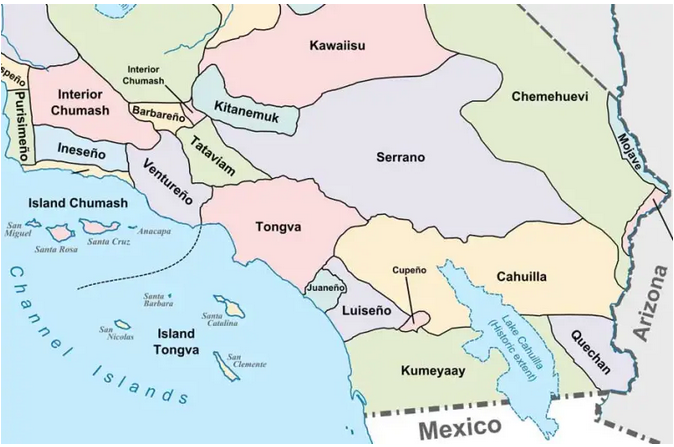
Southern California tribal territories

Tongva territories border those of numerous other tribes in the region. The historical Tongva lands made up what is now called "the coastal region of Los Angeles County, the northwest portion of Orange County and off-lying islands." In 1962 Curator Bernice Johnson, of Southwest Museum, asserted that the northern boundary was somewhere between Topanga and Malibu (perhaps the vicinity of Malibu Creek) and the southern boundary was Orange County's Aliso Creek.

== Names ==
=== Tongva ===
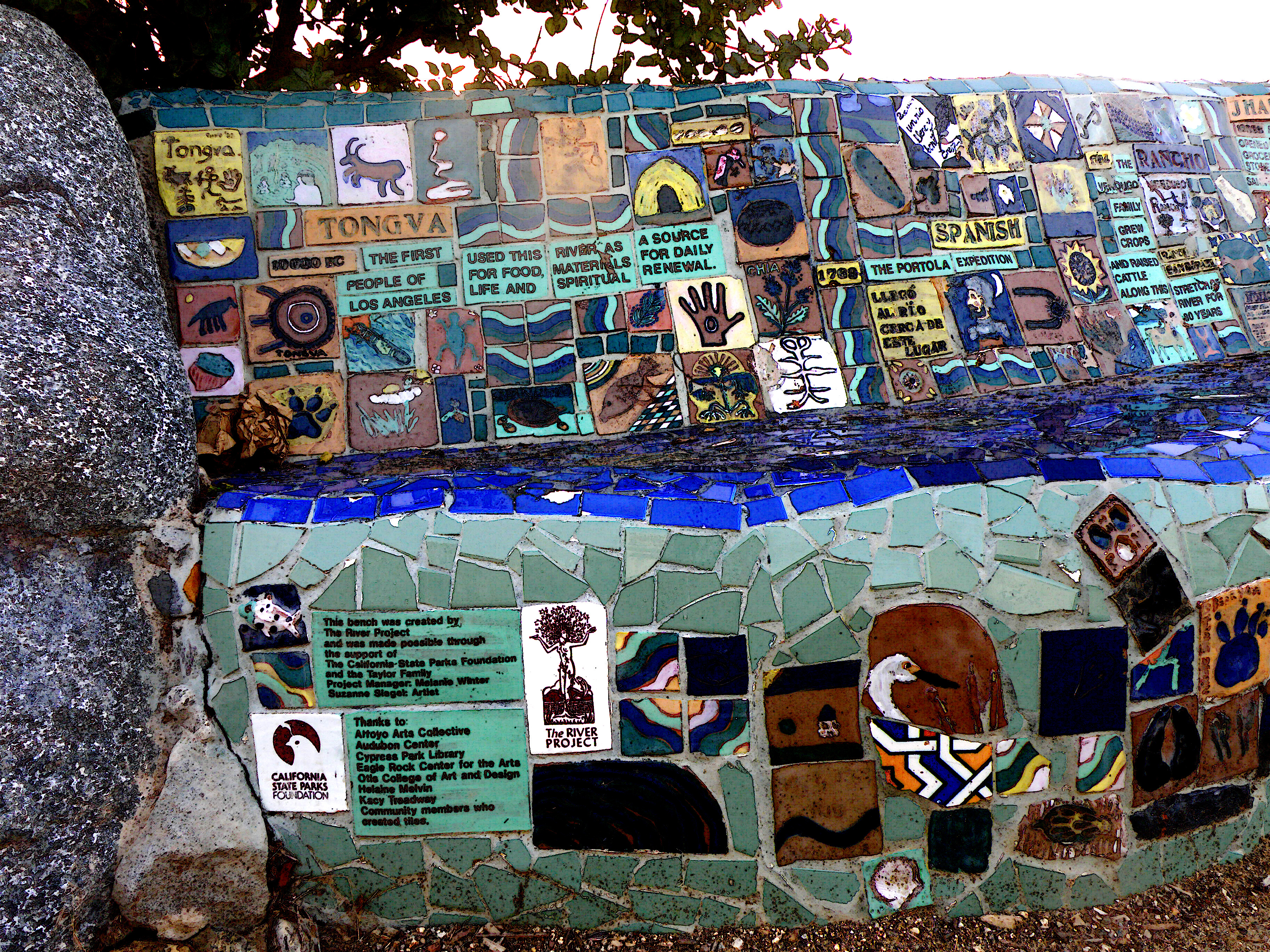
A bench with the name Tongva on it

The word Tongva was coined by C. Hart Merriam in 1905 from numerous informants. These included Mrs. James Rosemyre (née Narcisa Higuera) (Gabrileño), who lived around Fort Tejon, near Bakersfield. Merriam's orthography makes it clear that the endonym would be pronounced /ˈtoːŋve/.

Some descendants prefer the endonym Kizh, which they argue is an earlier and more historically accurate name that was well documented by records of the Smithsonian Institution, Congress, the Catholic Church, the San Gabriel Mission, and other historical scholars.

=== Gabrieleño ===
The Spanish referred to the Indigenous peoples surrounding Mission San Gabriel as the Gabrieleño. This was not their autonym, or their name for themselves. Because of historical uses, the term is part of every official tribe's name in this area, spelled either as "Gabrieleño" or "Gabrielino".

Because tribal groups have disagreed about the appropriate use of the term Tongva, they have adopted Gabrieleño as a mediating term. For example, when Debra Martin, a city council member from Pomona, led a project in 2017 to dedicate wooden statues in local Ganesha Park to the Indigenous people of the area, they disagreed over which name, Tongva or Kizh, should be used on the dedication plaque. Tribal officials tentatively agreed to use the term Gabrieleño.

The Act of September 21, 1968, introduced this concept of the affiliation of an applicant's ancestors to exclude certain individuals from receiving a share of the award to the "Indians of California" who chose to receive a share of any awards to certain tribes in California that had splintered off from the generic group. The members or ancestors of the petitioning group were not affected by the exclusion in the Act. Individuals with lineal or collateral descent from an Indian tribe who resided in California in 1852 would, if not excluded by the provisions of the Act of 1968, remain on the list of the "Indians of California". To comply with the Act, the Secretary of the Interior would have to collect information about the group affiliation of an applicant's Indian ancestors. That information would be used to identify applicants who could share in another award. The group affiliation of an applicant's ancestors was thus a basis for exclusion from, but not a requirement for inclusion on, the judgment roll. The act of 1968 stated that the Secretary of the Interior would distribute an equal share of the award to the individuals on the judgment roll "regardless of group affiliation".

== History ==
=== Before the mission period ===
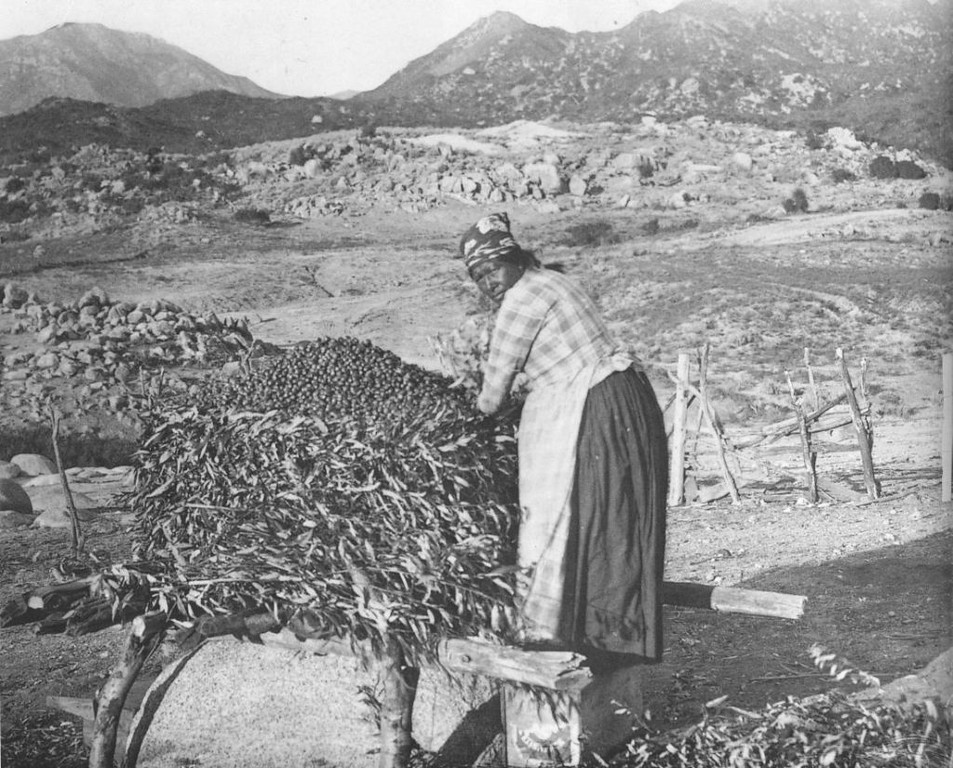
Photograph of a Mission Indian (Gabrieleño) woman filling a granary with acorns, c. 1898

Many lines of evidence suggest that the Tongva are descended from Uto-Aztecan-speaking peoples who originated in what is now Nevada, and moved southwest into coastal Southern California 3,500 years ago. According to a model proposed by archaeologist Mark Q. Sutton, these migrants either absorbed or pushed out the earlier Hokan-speaking inhabitants. By 500 AD, one source estimates the Tongva may have come to occupy all the lands now associated with them, although this is unclear and contested among scholars.

In 1811, the priests of Mission San Gabriel recorded at least four languages: Kokomcar, Guiguitamcar, Corbonamga, and Sibanga. During the same time, three languages were recorded in Mission San Fernando.

Before Russian and Spanish colonization in what is now referred to California, the Tongva were primarily identified by their associated villages (Topanga, Cahuenga, Tujunga, Cucamonga, etc.) For example, individuals from Yaanga were known as Yaangavit among the people (in mission records, they were recorded as Yabit). The Tongva lived in as many as one hundred villages. One or two clans would usually constitute a village, which was the center of Tongva life.

The Tongva spoke a language of the Uto-Aztecan family (the remote ancestors of the Tongva probably coalesced as a people in the Sonoran Desert, between perhaps 3,000 and 5,000 years ago). The diversity within the Takic group is "moderately deep"; rough estimates by comparative linguists place the breakup of common Takic into the Luiseño-Juaneño on one hand, and the Tongva-Serrano on the other, at about 2,000 years ago. (This is comparable to the differentiation of the Romance languages of Europe). The division of the Tongva/Serrano group into the separate Tongva and Serrano peoples is more recent, and may have been influenced by Spanish missionary activity.

The majority of Tongva territory was located in what has been referred to as the Sonoran life zone, with rich ecological resources, including acorns, pine nuts, small game, and deer. On the coast, shellfish, sea mammals, and fish were available. Before Christianization, the prevailing Tongva worldview held that humans were not the apex of creation but rather one strand in the web of life. Humans, along with plants, animals, and the land, were in a reciprocal relationship of mutual respect and care, which is evident in their creation stories. The Tongva understand time as nonlinear and there is constant communication with ancestors.

On October 7, 1542, an exploratory expedition led by Spanish explorer Juan Cabrillo reached Santa Catalina in the Channel Islands, where Tongva greeted his ships in a canoe. The following day, Cabrillo and his men, the first Europeans known to have interacted with the Gabrieleño people, entered a large bay on the mainland, which they named "Baya de los Fumos" ("Bay of Smokes") on account of the many smoke fires they saw there. This is commonly believed to be San Pedro Bay, near present-day San Pedro.

=== Colonization and the mission period (1769–1834) ===
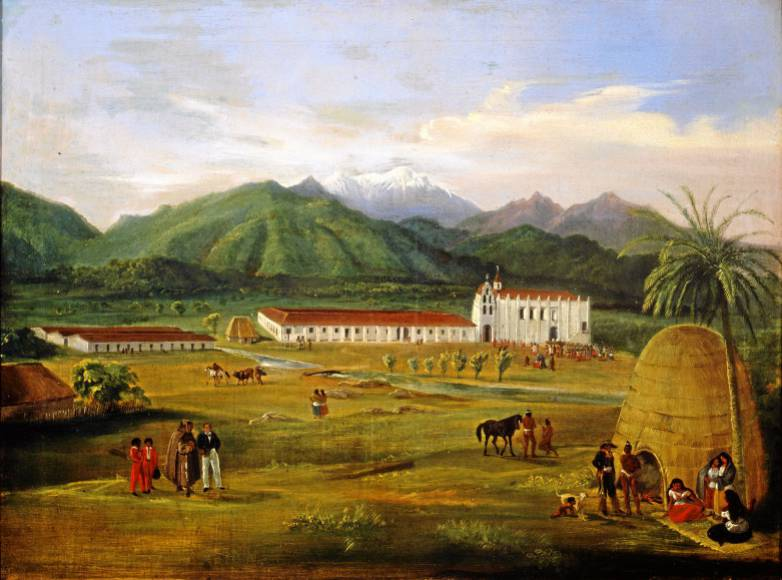
Painting of Mission San Gabriel by Ferdinand Deppe (1832) showing a Gabrieleño kiiy thatched with tule

The Gaspar de Portola expedition in 1769 was the first contact by land to reach Tongva territory, marking the beginning of Spanish colonization. Franciscan padre Junipero Serra accompanied Portola. Within two years of the expedition, Serra had founded four missions, including Mission San Gabriel, founded in 1771 and rebuilt in 1774, and Mission San Fernando, founded in 1797. The people enslaved at San Gabriel were referred to as Gabrieleños, while those enslaved at San Fernando were referred to as Fernandeños. Although their language idioms were distinguishable, they did not diverge greatly, and it is possible there were as many as half a dozen dialects rather than the two which the existence of the missions has lent the appearance of being standard. The demarcation of the Fernandeño and the Gabrieleño territories is mostly conjectural. There is no known point at which the two groups differed markedly in customs. The wider Gabrieleño group occupied what is now Los Angeles County south of the Sierra Madre and half of Orange County, as well as the islands of Santa Catalina and San Clemente.

The Spanish oversaw the construction of Mission San Gabriel in 1771. The Spanish colonizers used slave labor from local villages to construct the Missions. Following the destruction of the original mission, probably due to El Niño flooding, the Spanish ordered the mission relocated five miles north in 1774 and began referring to the Tongva as "Gabrieleno." At the Gabrieleño settlement of Yaanga along the Los Angeles River, missionaries and Indian neophytes, or baptized converts, built the first town of Los Angeles in 1781. It was called El Pueblo de Nuestra Señora la Reina de los Ángeles de Porciúncula (The Village of Our Lady, the Queen of the Angels of Porziuncola). In 1784, a sister mission, the Nuestra Señora Reina de los Angeles Asistencia, was founded at Yaanga as well.

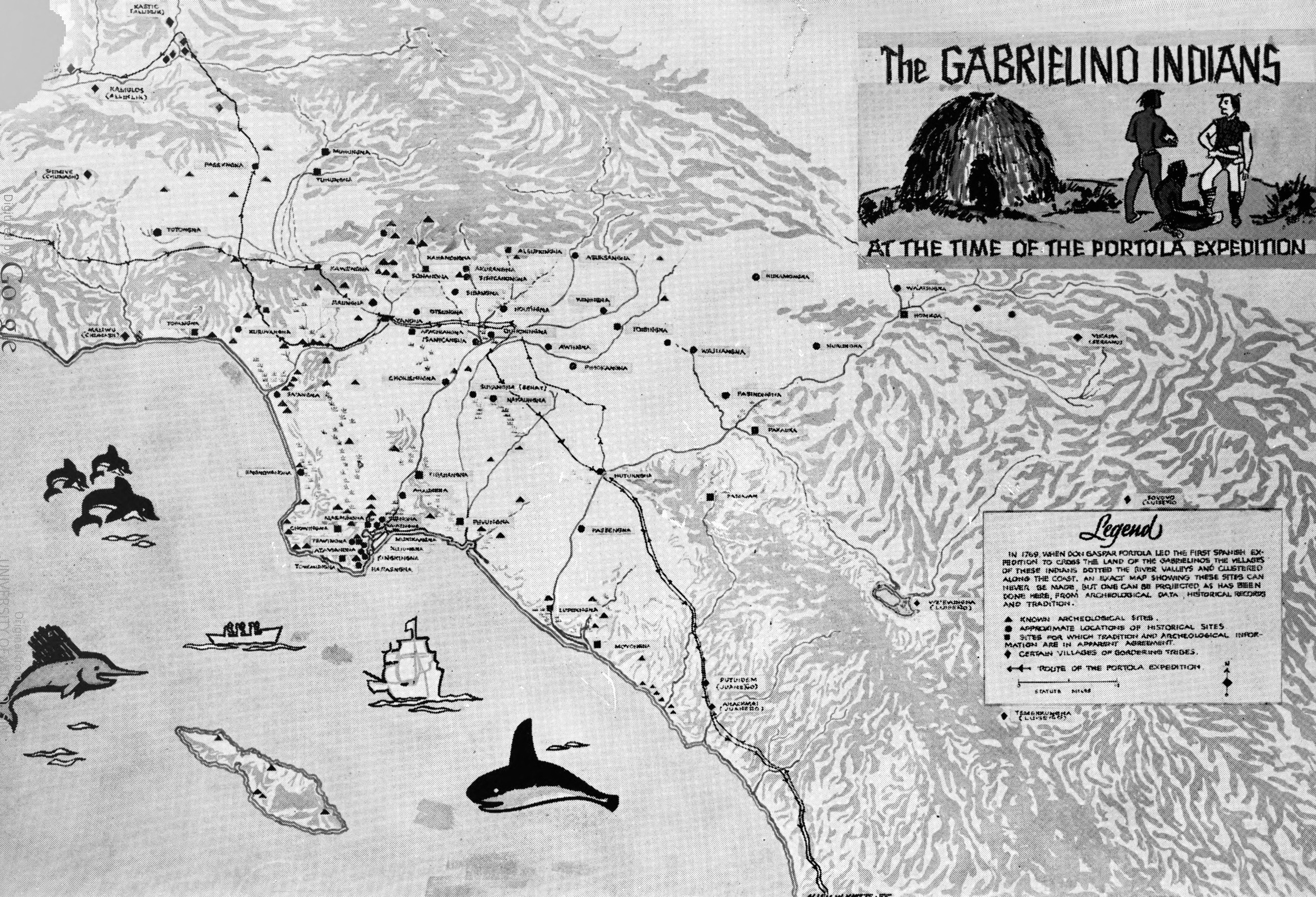
"The Gabrieleno Indians at the Time of the Portola Expedition," mapped by Bernice Johnston of the Southwest Museum (1962)

Entire villages were baptized and indoctrinated into the mission system with devastating results. For example, from 1788 to 1815, natives of the village of Guaspet were baptized at San Gabriel. Proximity to the missions created mass tension for Native Californians, which initiated "forced transformations in all aspects of daily life, including manners of speaking, eating, working, and connecting with the supernatural." As stated by scholars John Dietler, Heather Gibson, and Benjamin Vargas, "Catholic enterprises of proselytization, acceptance into a mission as a convert, in theory, required abandoning most, if not all, traditional lifeways." Various strategies of control were implemented to retain control, such as the use of violence, segregation by age and gender, and using new converts as instruments of control over others. For example, Mission San Gabriel's Father Zalvidea punished suspected shamans "with frequent flogging and by chaining traditional religious practitioners together in pairs and sentencing them to hard labor in the sawmill." A missionary during this period reported that three out of four children died at Mission San Gabriel before reaching the age of 2. Nearly 6,000 Tongva lie buried in the grounds of the San Gabriel Mission. Carey McWilliams characterized it as follows: "the Franciscan padres eliminated Indians with the effectiveness of Nazis operating concentration camps...."

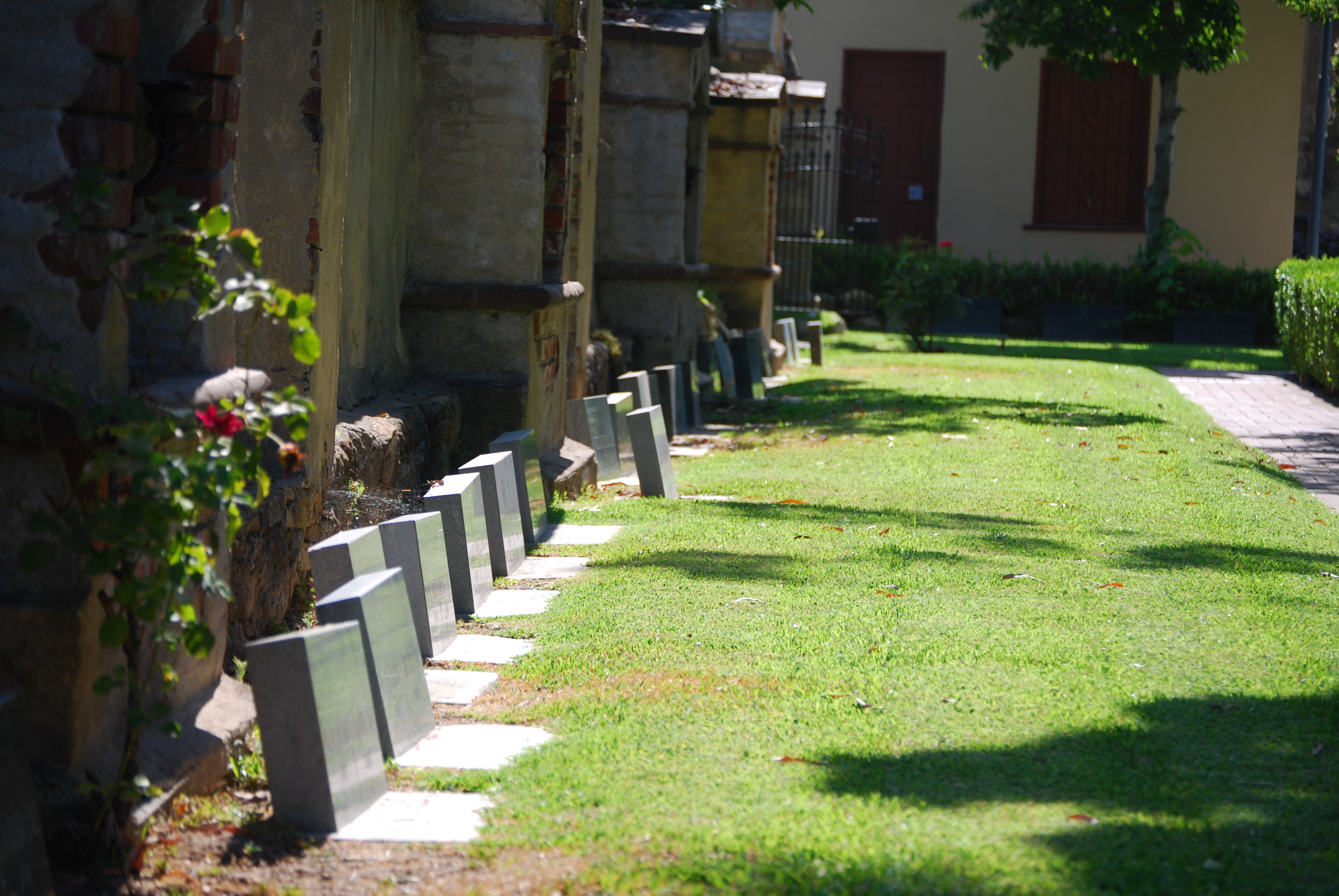
It is estimated that nearly 6,000 Tongva lie buried on the grounds of Mission San Gabriel from the mission period.

There is much evidence of Tongva resistance to the mission system. Many individuals returned to their village at the time of death. Many converts retained their traditional practices in both domestic and spiritual contexts, despite the attempts by the padres and missionaries to control them. Traditional foods were incorporated into the mission diet, and lithic and shell bead production and use persisted. More overt strategies of resistance, such as refusal to enter the system, work slowdowns, abortion and infanticide of children resulting from rape, and fugiti were also prevalent. Five major uprisings were recorded at Mission San Gabriel alone. Two late-eighteenth-century rebellions against the mission system were led by Nicolás José, who was an early convert who had two social identities: "publicly participating in Catholic sacraments at the mission but privately committed to traditional dances, celebrations, and rituals." He participated in a failed attempt to kill the mission's priests in 1779 and organized eight foothill villages in a revolt in October 1785 with Toypurina, who further organized the villages, which "demonstrated a previously undocumented level of regional political unification both within and well beyond the mission." However, divided loyalties among the natives contributed to the failure of the 1785 attempt, as well as mission soldiers being alerted of the attempt by converts or neophytes.

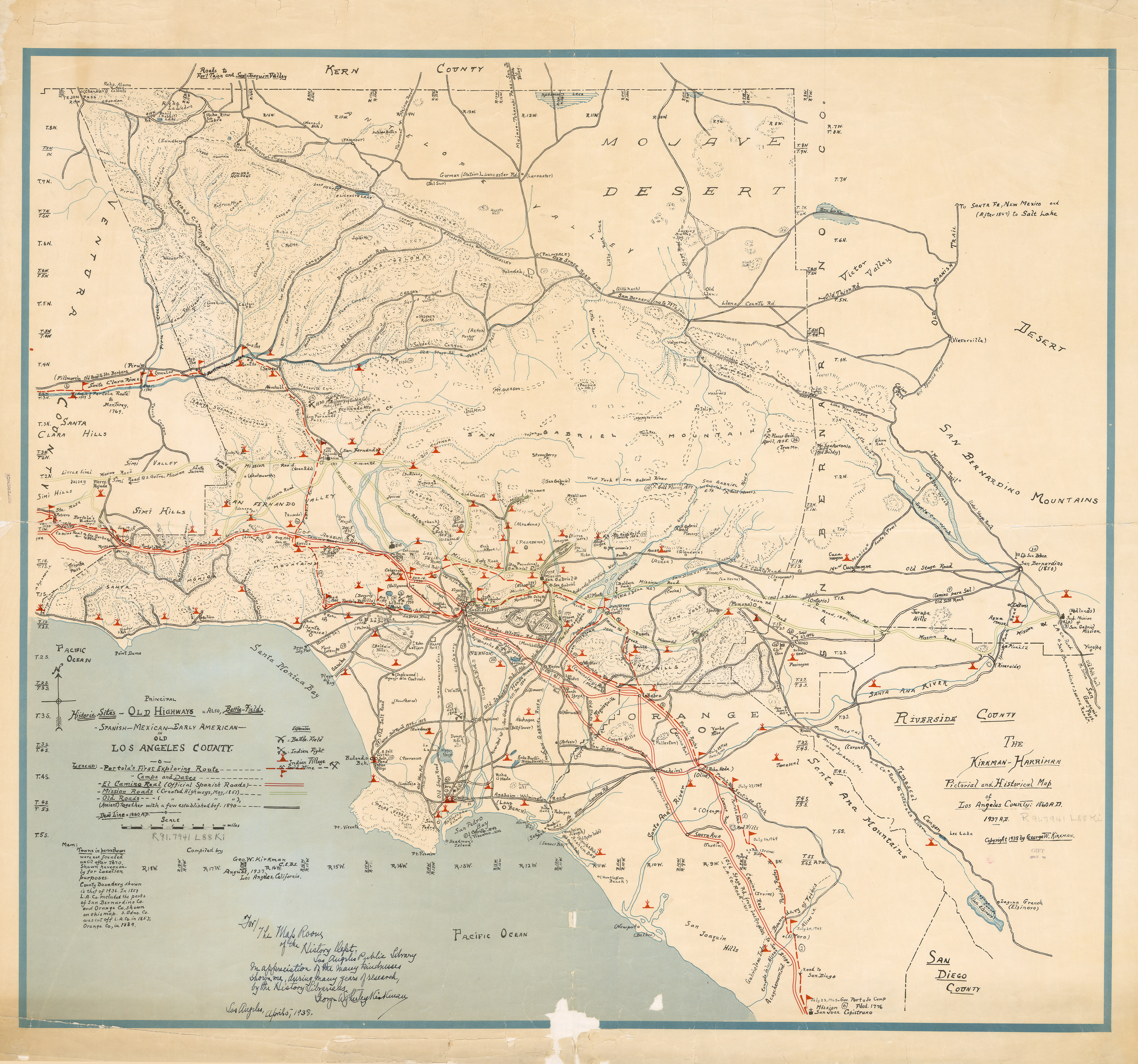
George W. Kirkman's 1938 historical map of pre-1860 Los Angeles County shows locations of "Gabrieleño" villages marked with generic "Indian teepees."

Toypurina, José and two other leaders of the rebellion, Chief Tomasajaquichi of Juvit village and a man named Alijivit, from the nearby village of Jajamovit, were put on trial for the 1785 rebellion. At his trial, José stated that he participated because the ban at the mission on dances and ceremonies instituted by the missionaries, and enforced by the governor of California in 1782, was intolerable as they prevented their mourning ceremonies. When questioned about the attack, Toypurina is famously quoted as saying that she participated in the instigation because “[she hated] the padres and all of you, for living here on my native soil, for trespassing upon the land of my forefathers and despoiling our tribal domains. … I came [to the mission] to inspire the dirty cowards to fight, and not to quail at the sight of Spanish sticks that spit fire and death, nor [to] retch at the evil smell of gunsmoke – and be done with you white invaders!’ Scholars have debated the accuracy of this quote, from Thomas Workman Temple II's article “Toypurina the Witch and the Indian Uprising at San Gabriel” suggesting it may differ significantly from the testimony recorded by Spanish authorities at the time. According to the soldier who recorded her words, she stated simply that she ‘‘was angry with the Padres and the others of the Mission, because they had come to live and establish themselves in her land.’’ In June 1788, nearly three years later, their sentences arrived from Mexico City: Nicolás José was banned from San Gabriel and sentenced to six years of hard labor in irons at the most distant penitentiary in the region. Toypurina was banished from Mission San Gabriel and sent to the most distant Spanish mission.

Resistance to Spanish rule demonstrated how the Spanish Crown's claims to California were both insecure and contested. By the 1800s, San Gabriel was the richest in the entire colonial mission system, supplying cattle, sheep, goats, hogs, horses, mules, and other supplies for settlers and settlements throughout Alta California.

Some historians have described the mission system as a form of coerced labor that deeply disrupted Indigenous lifeways and autonomy. Latter-day ethnologist Hugo Reid reported, “Indian children were taken from their parents to be raised behind bars at the mission. They were allowed outside the locked dormitories only to attend to church business and their assigned chores. When they were old enough, boys and girls were put to work in the vast vineyards and orchards owned by the missions. Soldiers watched, ready to hunt down any who tried to escape.” Writing in 1852, Reid said he knew of Tongva who “had an ear lopped off or were branded on the lip for trying to get away.”

In 1810, the "Gabrieleño" labor population at the mission was recorded to be 1,201. It jumped to 1,636 in 1820 and then declined to 1,320 in 1830. Resistance to this system of forced labor continued into the early 19th century. In 1817, the San Gabriel Mission recorded that there were "473 Indian fugitives." In 1828, a German immigrant purchased the land on which the village of Yang-Na stood and evicted the entire community with the help of Mexican officials.

=== Mexican secularization and occupation (1834–1848) ===
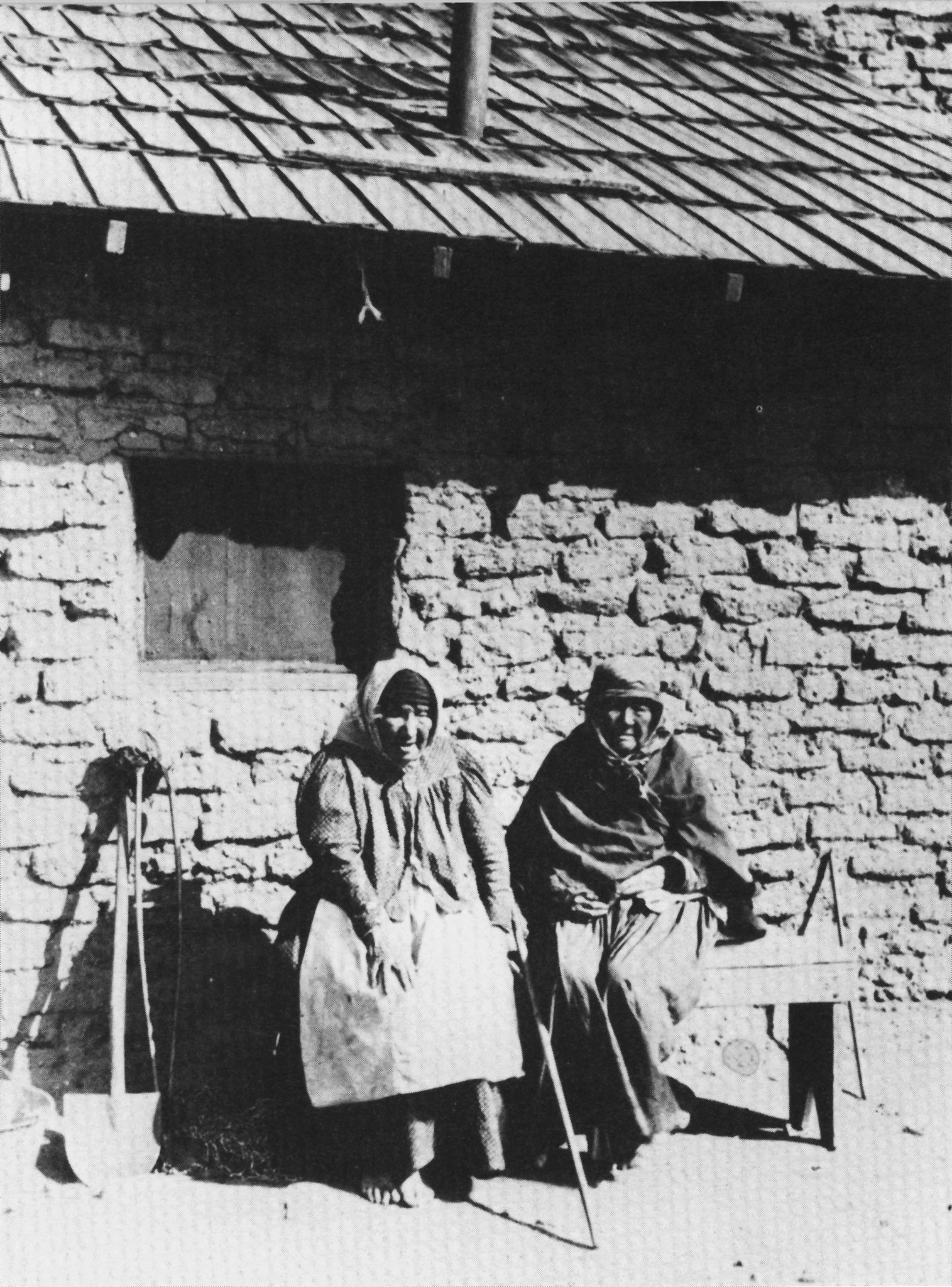
Two Tongva women at the San Fernando Mission, c. 1890

The mission period ended in 1834 with secularization under Mexican rule. Some "Gabrieleño" were absorbed into Mexican society as a result of secularization, which emancipated the neophytes. Tongva and other California Natives largely became workers while former Spanish elites were granted huge land grants. Land was systemically denied to California Natives by Californio land-owning men. In the Los Angeles Basin, only 20 former neophytes from the San Gabriel Mission received land under secularization. They received relatively small plots of land. A "Gabrieleño" by the name of Prospero Elias Dominguez was granted a 22-acre plot near the mission. In contrast, Mexican authorities granted the remainder of the mission land, approximately 1.5 million acres, to a few colonist families. In 1846, researcher Kelly Lytle Hernández noted that 140 Gabrieleños signed a petition demanding access to mission lands, which Californio authorities rejected.

Emancipated from enslavement in the missions yet barred from their own land, most Tongva became landless refugees during this period. Entire villages fled inland to escape the invaders and continued devastation. Others moved to Los Angeles, a city whose Native population increased from 200 in 1820 to 553 in 1836 (out of a total population of 1,088). As stated by scholar Ralph Armbruster-Sandoval, "while they should have been owners, the Tongva became workers, performing strenuous, back-breaking labor just as they had done ever since settler colonialism emerged in Southern California." As described by researcher Heather Valdez Singleton, Los Angeles was heavily dependent on Native labor and "grew slowly on the back of the Gabrieleño laborers." Some of the people became vaqueros on the ranches, highly skilled horsemen or cowboys, herding and caring for the cattle. There was little land available to the Tongva to use for food outside of the ranches. Some crops, such as corn and beans, were planted on ranchos to sustain the workers.

Several Gabrieleño families remained in San Gabriel township, which became "the cultural and geographic center of the Gabrieleño community." Yaanga also diversified and increased in size, with people of various Native backgrounds coming to live together shortly following secularization. However, the government had instituted a system dependent on Native labor and servitude and increasingly eliminated any alternatives within the Los Angeles area. As explained by Kelly Lytle Hernández, "there was no place for Natives living but not working in Mexican Los Angeles. In turn, the ayuntaminto (city council) passed new laws to compel Natives to work or be arrested." In January 1836, the council directed Californios to sweep across Los Angeles to arrest "all drunken Indians." As recorded by Hernández, "Tongva men and women, along with an increasingly diverse set of their Native neighbors, filled the jail and convict labor crews in Mexican Los Angeles." By 1844, most Natives in Los Angeles worked as servants in a perpetual system of servitude, tending to the land and serving settlers, invaders, and colonizers.

The ayuntamiunto forced the Native settlement of Yaanga to move farther away from town. By the mid-1840s, the settlement was forcibly moved eastward across the Los Angeles River, placing a divide between Mexican Los Angeles and the nearest Native community. However, "Native men, women, and children continued to live (not just work) in the city. On Saturday Nights, they even held parties, danced, and gambled at the removed Yaanga village and also at the plaza at the center of town." In response, the Californios continued to attempt to control Native lives, issuing Alta California governor Pio Pico a petition in 1846 stating: "We ask that the Indians be placed under strict police surveillance or the persons for whom the Indians work give [the Indians] quarter at the employer's rancho." In 1847, a law was passed that prohibited Gabrielinos from entering the city without proof of employment. A part of the proclamation read:

Indians who have no masters but are self-sustaining, shall be lodged outside of the City limits in localities widely separated... All vagrant Indians of either sex who have not tried to secure a situation within four days and are found unemployed, shall be put to work on public works or sent to the house of correction.

In 1848, Los Angeles formally became a town in the United States following the Mexican-American War.

=== American occupation and continued subjugation (1848–) ===
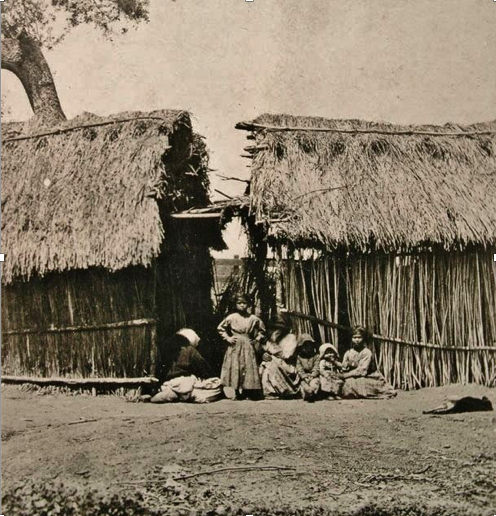
Gabrieleño dwellings at Acurag-na rancheria near Mission San Gabriel, California (1877–1880)

Landless and unrecognized, the people faced systemic discrimination, exploitation through convict labor, and loss of autonomy under American occupation. Some of the people were displaced to small Mexican and Native communities in the Eagle Rock and Highland Park districts of Los Angeles as well as Pauma, Pala, Temecula, Pechanga, and San Jacinto. The imprisonment of Natives in Los Angeles was a symbol of establishing the new "rule of law." The city's vigilante community would routinely "invade" the jail and hang the accused in the streets. Once Congress granted statehood to California in 1850, many of the first laws passed targeted Natives for arrest, imprisonment, and convict labor. The 1850 Act for the Government and Protection of Indians "targeted Native peoples for easy arrest by stipulating that they could be arrested on vagrancy charges based 'on the complaint of any reasonable citizen'", and Gabrieleños faced the brunt of this policy. Section 14 of the act stated:

When an Indian is convicted of any offence before a Justice of the Peace punishable by fine, any white person may, by consent of the Justice, give bond for said Indian, conditioned for the payment of said fine and costs, and in such case the Indian shall be compelled to work for the person so bailing, until he has discharged or cancelled the fine assessed against him.

Native men were disproportionately criminalized and swept into this legalized system of indentured servitude. As was recorded by Anglo-American settlers, "'White men, whom the Marshal is too discreet to arrest' ... spilled out of the town's many saloons, streets, and brothels, but the aggressive and targeted enforcement of state and local vagrancy and drunk codes filled the Los Angeles County Jail with Natives, most of whom were men." Most spent their days working on the county chain gang, which was largely involved with keeping the city streets clean in the 1850s and 1860s but increasingly included road construction projects as well.

Although federal officials reported that there were an estimated 16,930 California Indians and 1,050 at Mission San Gabriel, "the federal agents ignored them and those living in Los Angeles" because they were viewed as "friendly to the whites," as revealed in the personal diaries of Commissioner George W. Barbour. In 1852, the superintendent of Indian Affairs Edward Fitzgerald Beale echoed this sentiment, reporting that "because these Indians were Christians, with many holding ranch jobs and having interacted with whites," that "they are not much to be dreaded." Although a California Senate Bill of 2008 asserted that the US government signed treaties with the Gabrieleño, promising 8.5 million acres (3,400,000 ha) of land for reservations, and that these treaties were never ratified, a paper published in 1972 by Robert Heizer of the University of California at Berkeley, shows that the eighteen treaties made between April 29, 1851, and August 22, 1852, were negotiated with persons who did not represent the Tongva people and that none of these persons had authority to cede lands that belonged to the people.

An 1852 editorial in the Los Angeles Star revealed the public's anger towards any possibility of the Gabrieleño receiving recognition and exercising sovereignty:

To place upon our most fertile soil the most degraded race of aborigines upon the North American Continent, to invest them with the rights of sovereignty, and to teach them that they are to be treated as powerful and independent nations, is planting the seeds of future disaster and ruin... We hope that the general government will let us alone – that it will neither undertake to feed, settle or remove the Indians amongst whom we in the South reside, and that they leave everything just as it now exists, except affording us the protection which two or three cavalry companies would give.

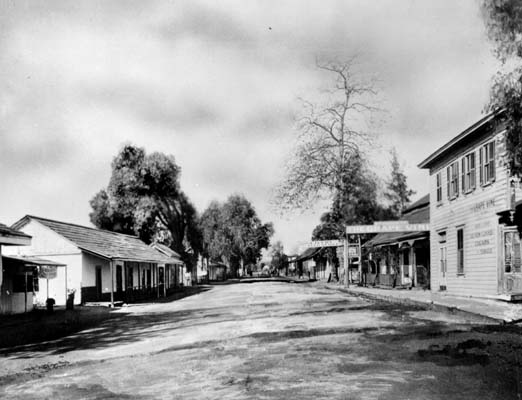
Mission Road in San Gabriel (1880). San Gabriel township remained the center of Gabrieleño life into the 20th century.

In 1852, Hugo Reid wrote a series of letters for the Los Angeles Star from the center of the Gabrieleño community in San Gabriel township, describing Gabrieleño life and culture. Reid himself was married to a Gabrieleño woman named Bartolomea Cumicrabit, whom he renamed "Victoria." Reid wrote the following: "Their chiefs still exist. In San Gabriel remain only four, and those young... They have no jurisdiction more than to appoint times for holding of Feasts and regulating affairs connected with the church [traditional structure made of brush]." There is some speculation that Reid was campaigning for the position of Indian agent in Southern California, but died before he could be appointed. Instead, in 1852, Benjamin D. Wilson was appointed, who maintained the status quo. The letters of Hugo Reid revealed the names of 28 Gabrielino villages.

In 1855, the Gabrieleño were reported by the superintendent of Indian affairs Thomas J. Henley to be in "a miserable and degraded condition." However, Henley admitted that moving them to a reservation, potentially at Sebastian Reserve in Tejon Pass, would be opposed by the citizens because "in the vineyards, especially during the grape season, their labor is made useful and is obtained at a cheap rate." A few Gabrieleño were, in fact, at Sebastian Reserve and maintained contact with San Gabriel residents during this period.

In 1859, amidst increasing criminalization and absorption into the city's burgeoning convict labor system, the county grand jury declared "stringent vagrant laws should be enacted and enforced compelling such persons ['Indians'] to obtain an honest livelihood or seek their old homes in the mountains." This declaration ignored Reid's research, which stated that most Tongva villages, including Yaanga, "were located in the basin, along its rivers and on its shoreline, stretching from the deserts and to the sea." Only a few villages led by tomyaars (chiefs) were "in the mountains, where Chengiichngech's avengers, serpents, and bears lived," as described by historian Kelly Lytle Hernández. However, "the grand jury dismissed the depths of Indigenous claims to life, land, and sovereignty in the region and, instead, chose to frame Indigenous peoples as drunks and vagrants loitering in Los Angeles... disavowing a long history of Indigenous belonging in the basin."

While in 1848 Los Angeles was a small town largely populated by Mexicans and Native Americans, by 1880 it was home to an Anglo-American majority following waves of white migration in the 1870s, following the completion of the transcontinental railroad. As stated by research Heather Valdez Singleton, newcomers "took advantage of the fact that many Gabrieleño families, who had cultivated and lived on the same land for generations, did not hold legal title to the land, and used the law to evict Indian families." The Gabrieleño became vocal about this and notified former Indian agent J. Q. Stanley, who referred to them as "half-civilized" yet lobbied to protect the Gabrieleño "against the lawless whites living amongst them," arguing that they would become "vagabonds" otherwise. However, active Indian agent Augustus P. Greene's recommendation took precedent, arguing that "Mission Indians in southern California were slowing the settlement of this portion of the country for non-Indians and suggested that the Indians be completely assimilated," as summarized by Singleton.

In 1882, Helen Hunt Jackson was sent by the federal government to document the condition of the Mission Indians in southern California. She reported that there were a considerable number of people "in the colonies in the San Gabriel Valley, where they live like gypsies in brush huts, here today, gone tomorrow, eking out a miserable existence by days' work." However, even though Jackson's report would become the impetus for the Mission Indian Relief Act of 1891, the Gabrieleño were "overlooked by the commission charged with setting aside lands for Mission Indians." It is speculated that this may have been attributed to what was perceived as their compliance with the government, which caused them to be neglected, as noted earlier by Indian agent J. Q. Stanley.

==== Extinction controversy ====
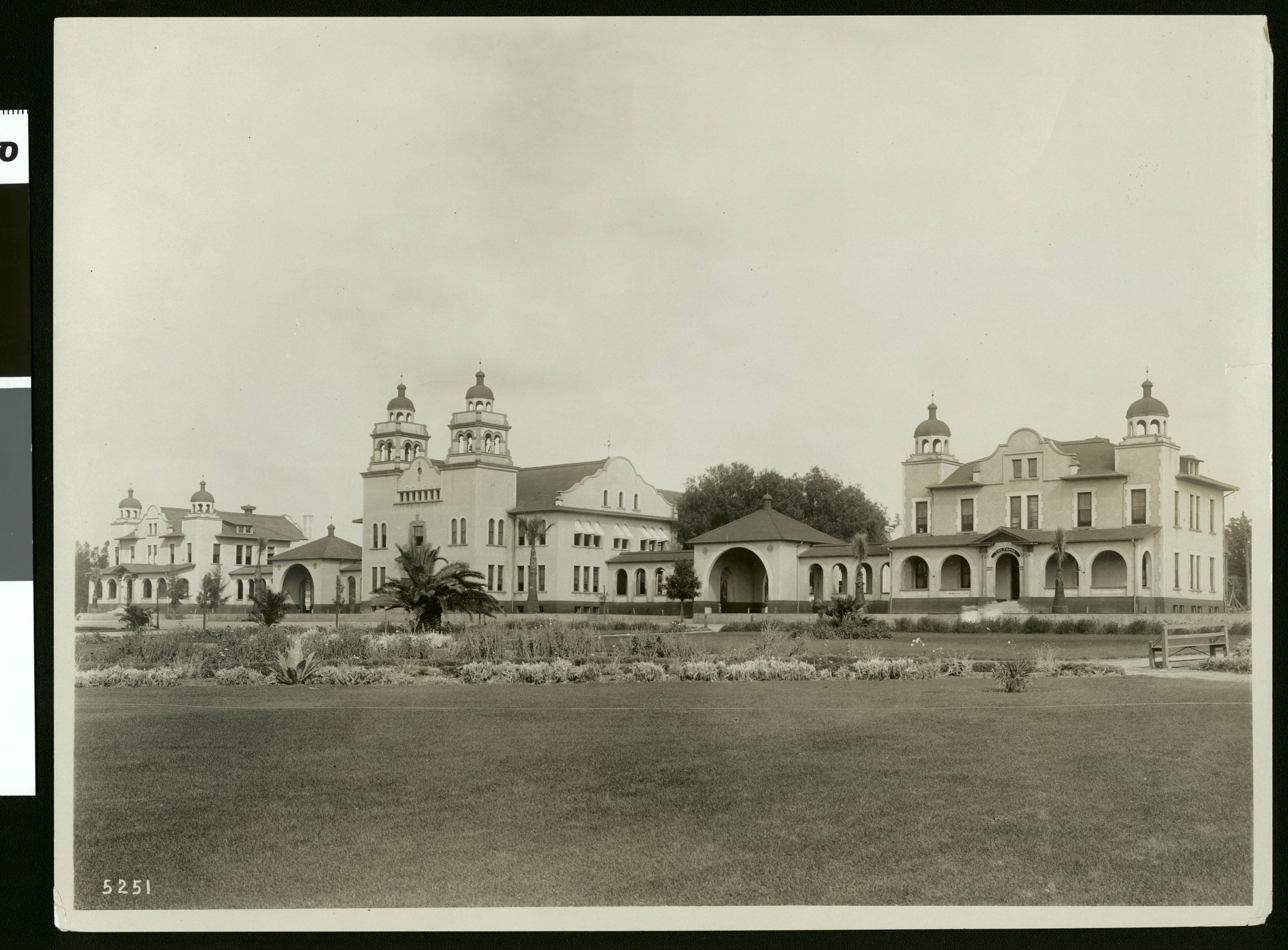
Sherman Indian School in Riverside (1910). Between 1890 and 1920, at least 50 Gabrieleño children were enrolled at this school on the recommendation of federal agents.

By the early twentieth century, Gabrieleño identity had suffered greatly under American occupation. Most Gabrieleño publicly identified as Mexican, learned Spanish, and adopted Catholicism while keeping their identity a secret. In schools, students were punished for mentioning that they were "Indian," and many of the people assimilated into Mexican-American or Chicano culture. Further attempts to establish a reservation for the Gabrieleño in 1907 failed. Soon, it began to be perpetuated in the local press that the Gabrieleño were extinct. In February 1921, the Los Angeles Times declared that the death of Jose de los Santos Juncos, an Indigenous man who lived at Mission San Gabriel and was 106 years old at his time of passing, "marked the passing of a vanished race." In 1925, Alfred Kroeber declared that the Gabrieleño culture was extinct, stating "they have melted away so completely that we know more of the finer facts of the culture of ruder tribes." Scholars have noted that this extinction myth has proven to be "remarkably resilient," yet is untrue.

Despite being declared extinct, Gabrieleño children were still being assimilated by federal agents who encouraged enrollment at Sherman Indian School in Riverside, California. Between 1890 and 1920, at least 50 Gabrieleño children were recorded at the school. Between 1910 and 1920, the establishment of the Mission Indian Federation, of which the Gabrieleño was a member, led to the 1928 California Indians Jurisdictional Act, which created official enrollment records for those who could prove ancestry to a California Indian living in the state in 1852. Over 150 people self-identified as Gabrieleño on this roll. A Gabrieleño woman at Tejon Reservation provided the names and addresses of several Gabrieleño living in San Gabriel, showing that contact between the group at Tejon Reservation and the group at San Gabriel township, which are more than 70 miles apart, was being maintained into the 1920s and 1930s.

In 1971, Bernice Johnston, former curator of the Southwest Museum and author of California’s Gabrielino Indians (1962), spoke to the Los Angeles Times: “After spending much of her life trying to trace the Indians, she believes she almost came in contact with some Gabrielinos a few years ago…She relates that on a Sunday, while giving a tour of the museum, ‘I saw these shy, dark people looking around. They were asking questions about the Gabrielino Indians. I asked why they wanted to know, and nearly fell over when they told me they were Gabrielinos and wanted to know something about themselves. I was busy with the tour, we were crowded. I rushed back to them as soon as I could but they were gone. I didn’t even get their names.”

==== Desecrated sites and Land Back ====
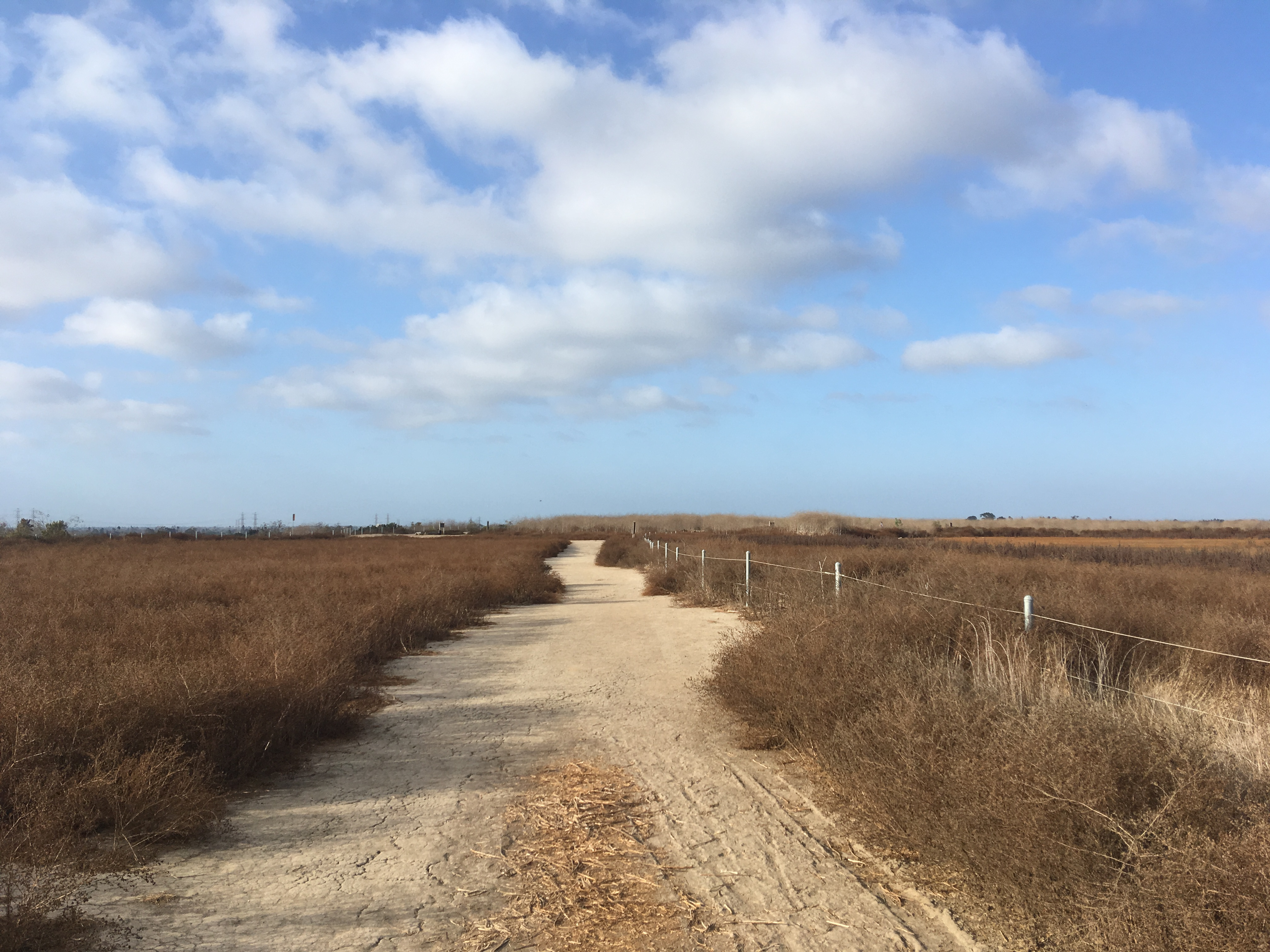
Tongva sites continue to be destroyed due to a lack of federal recognition. Fairview Park (pictured in 2017) in Costa Mesa is near a Tongva site dated 9,000 years old that has been threatened.

Historians and contemporary Tongva advocates have argued that Anglo-American institutions, including schools and museums, have historically undermined efforts to preserve tribal identity in the 20th and 21st centuries. Contemporary members have cited being denied the legitimacy of their identity. Tribal identity is also hindered by a lack of federal recognition and having no land base, which has meant that the tribe has access to almost none of their traditional homelands.

The Tongva have also struggled to protect their sacred sites, ancestral remains, and artefacts from destruction in the 21st century. In 2001, a 9,000-year-old Bolsa Chica village site was heavily damaged. The company that conducted the initial archaeological survey was fined $600,000 for its flawed assessment, which clearly favored the developer. Burials near the site of Genga were unearthed and moved, despite opposition from the tribes, in favor of commercial development.

In 2019, CSU, Long Beach dumped trash and dirt on top of Puvunga in its construction of new student housing, which reawakened a decades-long dispute between the university and the tribe over the treatment of the sacred site. In 2022, it was announced that part of the village site of Genga may be transformed into a green space. Leaders of the project have claimed that "tribal descendants of the area’s earliest residents will also have a voice" in how the park is developed.

The Tongva Taraxat Paxaavxa Conservancy has been established as part of the Land Back movement and for the rematriation of Tongva homelands. The kuuyam nahwá’a ("guest exchange") has been developed by the conservancy as a way for people living in the homelands of the Tongva to pay a form of contribution for living on the land. In October 2022, a 1-acre site was returned to the conservancy by a private resident in Altadena, which marked the first time the Tongva had land in Los Angeles County in 200 years.

== Culture ==
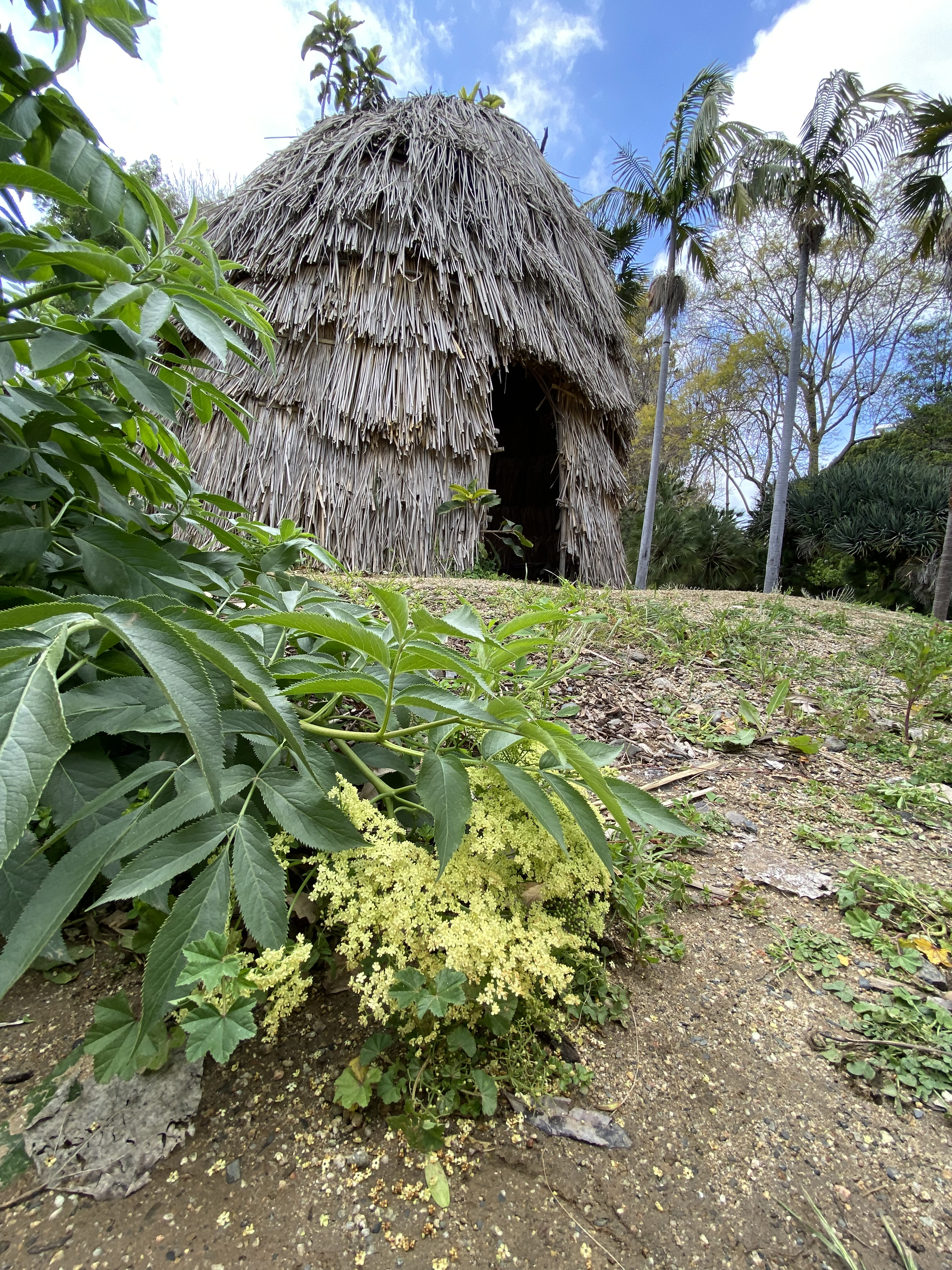
Replica Tongva kiiy and California native elderberry in blossom at Tongva Sacred Springs in Los Angeles

The Tongva lived in the main part of the most fertile lowland of southern California, including a stretch of sheltered coast with a pleasant climate and abundant food resources, as well as Santa Catalina, San Clemente, and San Nicolas Islands. The Tongva were a prominent cultural group south of the Tehachapi and among the Uto-Aztecan speakers in California, influencing other Indigenous groups through trade and interaction. Many of the cultural developments of the surrounding southern peoples had their origin with the Gabrieleño. The Tongva territory was the center of a flourishing trade network that extended from the Channel Islands in the west to the Colorado River in the east, allowing the people to maintain trade relations with the Cahuilla, Serrano, Luiseño, Chumash, and Mohave.

Like all Indigenous peoples, they utilized and coexisted with the flora and fauna of their familial territory. Villages were located throughout four major ecological zones, as noted by biologist Matthew Teutimez: interior mountains and foothills, grassland/oak woodland, sheltered coastal canyons, and the exposed coast. Therefore, resources such as plants, animals, and earth minerals were diverse and used for various purposes, including for food and materials. Prominent flora included oak (Quercus agrifolia) and willow (Salix spp.) trees, chia (Salvia columbariae), cattail (Typha spp.), datura or jimsonweed (Datura innoxia), white sage (Salvia apiana), Juncus spp., Mexican Elderberry (Sambucus), wild tobacco (Nicotiana spp.), and yucca (Hesperoyucca whipplei). Prominent fauna included mule deer, pronghorns, black bears, grizzly bears, black-tailed jackrabbits, cottontails, bald eagles, red-tailed hawks, dolphins, and gray whales.

=== Te'aat and the ocean ===
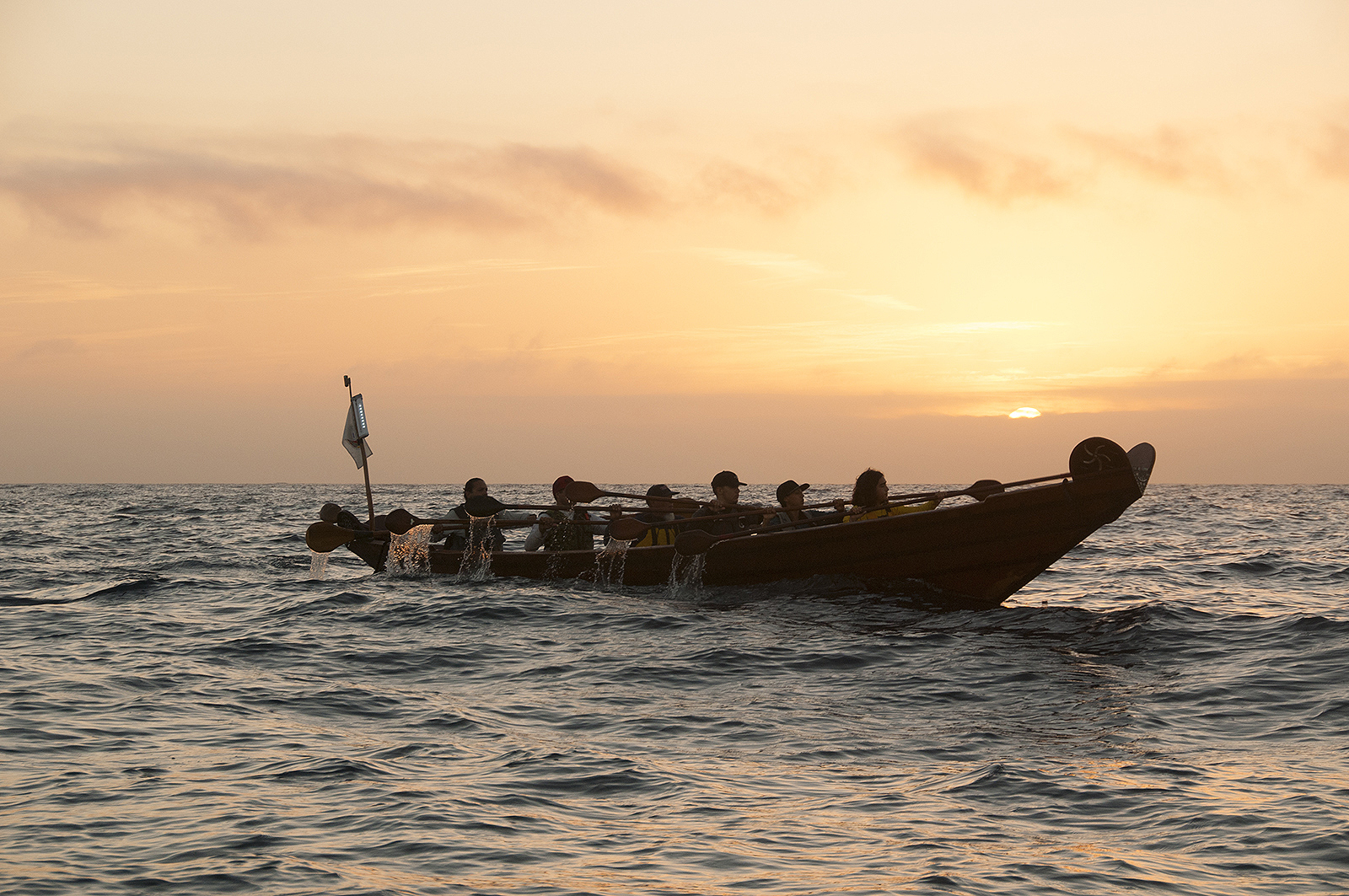
Te'aats, also referred to as tomols (Chumash), were widely used by the Tongva and were especially important for trade. A tomol pictured in 2015.

The Tongva had a concentrated population along the coast. They fished and hunted in the estuary of the Los Angeles River, and like the Chumash, their neighbors to the north and west along the Pacific coast, the Gabrieleño built seaworthy plank canoes, called te'aat, from driftwood. To build them, they used planks of driftwood pine that were sewn together with vegetable fiber cord, edge to edge, and then glued with the tar that was available either from the La Brea Tar Pits, or as asphalt that had washed up on shore from offshore oil seeps. The finished vessel was caulked with plant fibers and tar, stained with red ochre, and sealed with pine pitch. The te'aat, as noted by the Sebastián Vizcaíno expedition, could hold up to 20 people as well as their gear and trade goods. These canoes allowed the development of trade between the mainland villages and the offshore islands, and were important to the region's economy and social organization, with trade in food and manufactured goods being carried on between the people on the mainland coast and people in the interior as well. The Gabrieleño regularly paddled their canoes to Catalina Island, where they gathered abalone, which they pried off the rocks with implements made of fragments of whale ribs or other strong bones.

=== Food culture ===
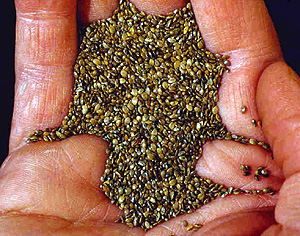
Chia (Salvia columbariae) seeds are integral to the Tongva diet.

In the Tongva economic system, food resources were managed by the village chief, who received a portion of the daily yield from hunting, fishing, or gathering to add to the communal food reserves. Individual families stored food for use during periods of scarcity. Villages were located in places with accessible drinking water, protection from the elements, and productive areas where different ecological niches on the land intersected. Situating their villages on these resource islands enabled the Tongva to gather plant products from two or more adjacent zones.

Households consisted of a main house (kiiy) and temporary camp shelters used during food-gathering excursions. In the summer, families who lived near grasslands collected roots, seeds, flowers, fruit, and leafy greens, and in the winter, families who lived near chaparral shrubland collected nuts and acorns, yucca, and hunted deer. The group used “wooden tongs” to collect prickly pear fruits.

Some prairie communities moved to the coast in the winter to fish, hunt whales and elephant seals, and harvest shellfish. Villages located on the coast conducted food-collecting trips inland during the winter rainy season to gather roots, tubers, corms, and bulbs of plants such as cattails, lilies, and wild onions.

The Tongva did not practice horticulture or agriculture, as their well-developed hunter-gatherer and trade economy provided adequate food resources. The bread was made from the yellow pollen of cattail heads, and the underground rhizomes were dried and ground into a starchy meal. The young shoots were eaten raw. The seeds of chia, a herbaceous plant of the sage family, were gathered in large quantities when they were ripe. The flower heads were beaten with a paddle over a tightly woven basket to collect the seeds. These were dried or roasted and ground into a flour called "pinole," which was often mixed with the flour of other ground seeds or grains. Water was added to make a cooling drink; mixing with less water produced a porridge that could be baked into cakes.

Acorn mush was a staple food for all the Indigenous peoples who were forcibly relocated to missions in Southern California. Acorns were gathered in October; this was a communal effort with the men climbing the trees and shaking them while the women and children collected the nuts. The acorns were stored in large wicker granaries supported by wooden stakes well above the ground. Preparing them for food took about a week. Acorns were placed, one at a time, on end in the slight hollow of a rock and their shells broken by a light blow from a small hammerstone; then the membrane, or skin, covering the acorn meat was removed. Following this process, the acorn meats were dried for days, after which the kernels were pounded into a meal with a pestle. This was done in a stone mortar or in a mortar hole in a boulder. Large bedrock outcroppings near oak stands often display evidence of the community mills where the women labored.

The pounded acorn meal was put into baskets, and the bitter tannic acid it contained was leached out to make the meal more palatable and digestible. The prepared meal was cooked by boiling in water in a watertight grass-woven basket or in a soapstone bowl into which heated stones were dropped. Soapstone casseroles were used directly over the fire. Various foods, such as meat, seeds, and roots, were cooked using the same method. The mush thus prepared was eaten cold or nearly so, as was all their food. Another favored Tongva food was the seed kernel of a species of plum (Prunus ilicifolia (common name: holly-leaf cherry) they called islay, which was ground into meal and made into gruel.

Men performed most of the heavy, short-duration labor; they hunted, fished, assisted with some food-gathering, and engaged in trade with other cultural groups. Large game animals were hunted with bows and arrows, and small game was taken with deadfall traps, snares, and bows made of buckeye wood. John P. Harrington recorded that rattlesnake venom was used as an arrow poison. Burrowing animals were driven from their burrows with smoke and clubbed; communal rabbit drives were made during the seasonal controlled burning of chaparral on the prairie, the rabbits being killed with nets, bow and arrows, and throwing sticks.

Harpoons, spear-throwers, and clubs were used to hunt marine mammals and te'aat used to access them. Fishing was done from shorelines or along rivers, streams, and creeks with hook and line, nets, basketry traps, spears, bow and arrows, and poisons made from plants. Reciprocity and resource sharing were important values in the Tongva culture. Hugo Reid reported that the hoarding of food supplies was so stigmatized by the Tongva moral code that hunters would give away large portions of coveted foods such as fresh meat, and under some circumstances, were prohibited from eating their own kill or fishermen from eating their own catch.

Women collected and prepared plant and some animal food resources and made baskets, pots, and clothing. In their old age, they and the old men cared for the young and taught them Tongva lifeways.

=== Material culture ===
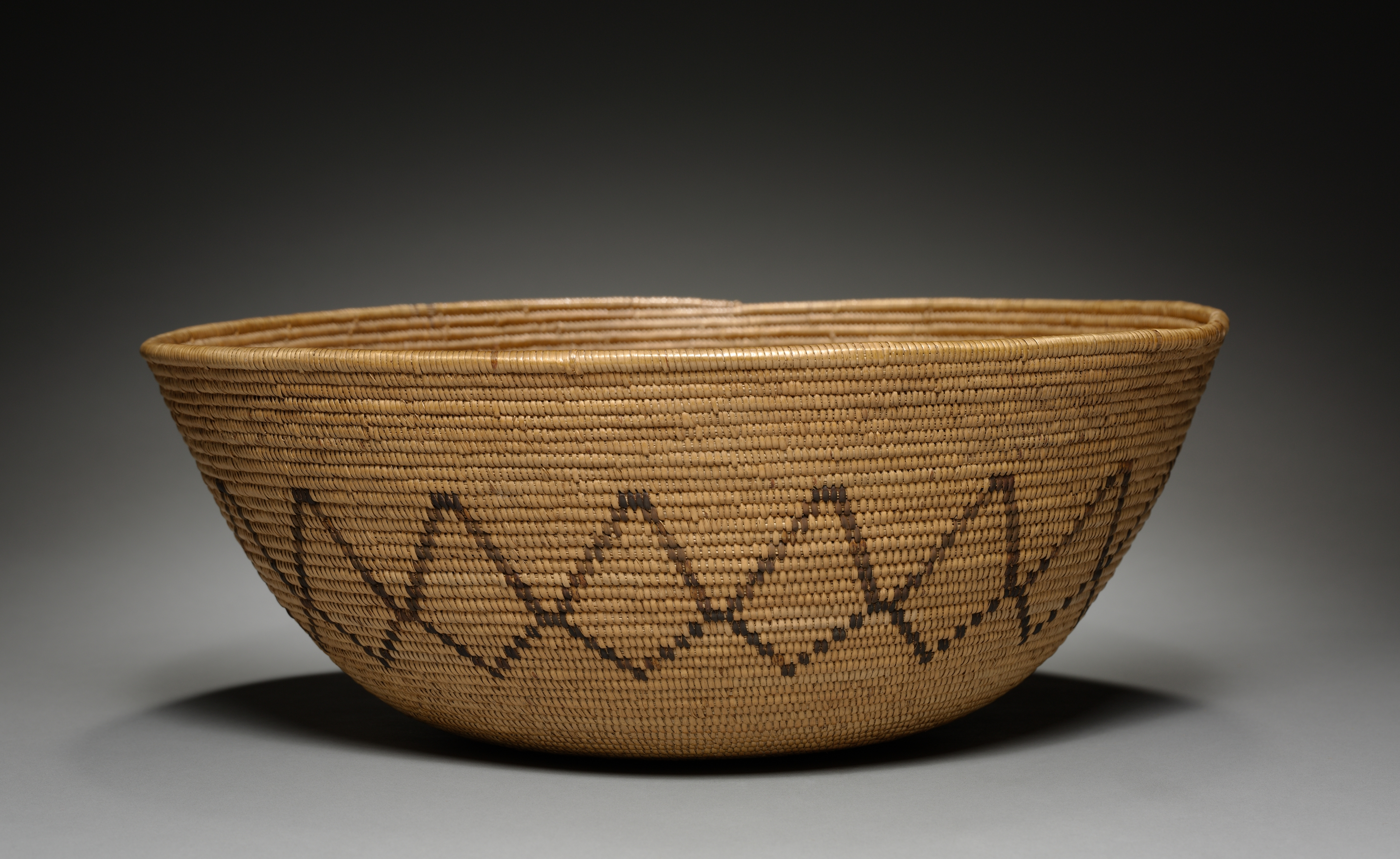
Tongva basket or bowl was created in the late 19th or early 20th century

Tongva material culture and technology utilized the working properties of natural materials and craftsmanship, visible in items of everyday utility decorated with shell inlay, carving, and painting. Most of these items, including baskets, shell tools, and wooden weapons, were perishable. Soapstone from quarries on Catalina Island was used to make cooking implements, animal carvings, pipes, ritual objects, and ornaments.

Using the stems of rushes (Juncus sp.), grass (Muhlenbergia rigens), and squawbush (Rhus trilobata), women fabricated coiled and twined basketry in a three-color pattern for household use, seed collecting, and ceremonial containers to hold grave offerings. They sealed some baskets, such as water bottles, with asphalt to make watertight containers for holding liquids.

The Tongva used the leaves of tule reeds as well as those of cattails to weave mats and thatch their shelters.

Living in the mild climate of Southern California, the men and children usually went nude, and women wore only a two-piece skirt, the back made from the flexible inner bark of cottonwood or willow, or occasionally deerskin. The front apron was made of cords of twisted dogbane or milkweed. People went barefoot except in rough areas, where they wore crude sandals made of yucca fiber. In cold weather, they wore robes or capes made from twisted strips of rabbit fur, deer skins, or bird skins with the feathers still attached. Also used as blankets at night, these were made of sea otter skins along the coast and on the islands. “Women were tattooed from cheek to shoulder blade, from elbow to shoulder,” with cactus thorns used as needles and charcoal dust rubbed into the wounds as “ink,” leaving a blue-gray mark under the skin after the wounds healed.

=== Social culture ===
There were three capital crimes in the community: murder, incest, and disrespect for elders.

According to Father Gerónimo Boscana, relations between the Chumash, Gabrieleños, Luiseños, and Diegueños, as he called them, were generally peaceful but “when there was a war it was ferocious…no quarter was given, and no prisoners were taken except the wounded.”

== Contemporary tribe ==
The earliest ethnological surveys of the Christianized population of the San Gabriel area, then known to the Spanish as Gabrielino, were conducted in the mid-19th century. By this time, their pre-Christian religious beliefs and mythology had already begun to fade. The Gabrieleño language was on the brink of extinction by 1900, so only fragmentary records of the Gabrieleño Indigenous language and culture have been preserved. Gabrieleño was one of the Cupan languages in the Takic language group, which is part of the Uto-Aztecan family. It may be considered a dialect of Fernandeño, but it has not been a language of everyday conversation since the 1940s. The Gabrieleño people now speak English, but a few are attempting to revive their language by using it in everyday conversation and ceremonial contexts. Currently, Gabrieleño is also used in language revitalization classes and in public discussions of religious and environmental issues.

The library of Loyola Marymount University, located in Los Angeles (Westchester), has an extensive collection of archival materials related to the Tongva and their history.

In the 21st century, an estimated 1,700 people self-identify as members of the Tongva or Gabrieleño tribe. In 1994, the state of California recognized the Gabrielino-Tongva Tribe (Spanish: Tribu de Gabrieleño-Tongva) and the Fernandino-Tongva Tribe (Spanish: Tribu de Fernandeño-Tongva), but neither has gained federal recognition. In 2013, it was reported that the four Tongva groups that had applied for federal recognition had over 3,900 members collectively.

The Gabrieleño/Tongva people do not accept one organization or government as representing them. They have had strong internal disagreements about governance and their future, largely related to plans supported by some members to open a gaming casino on land that would be considered part of the Gabrieleño/Tongva homeland. Gaming casinos have generated great revenues for many Native American tribes, but not all Tongva people believe the benefits outweigh the negative aspects. The Gabrielino/Tongva Tribe (sometimes called the "slash" group) and the Gabrielino-Tongva Tribe (sometimes called the "hyphen" group) are the two primary factions advocating for a casino for the Tongva nation, with revenue sharing among all people. The Gabrielino Tribal Council of San Gabriel, now known as the Kizh Nation (Gabrieleño Band of Mission Indians), claims that it does not support gaming. The Gabrielino Tongva San Gabriel Band of Mission Indians also opposes gambling and has been operating and meeting in the city of San Gabriel for more than 100 years. None of these organizations is recognized as a tribe by the federal government.

=== History of organizations and casino dispute ===
In 1990, the Gabrielino/Tongva of San Gabriel filed for federal recognition. Other Gabrieleño groups have likewise done so. The Gabrielino/Tongva of California Tribal Council and the Coastal Gabrielino-Diegueno Band of Mission Indians filed federal petitions in 1997. These applications for federal recognition remain pending.

The San Gabriel group was granted nonprofit status by the state of California in 1994. In 2001, the San Gabriel City Council divided over concessions granted to the developers of Playa Vista and a proposal to build an Indian casino in Compton, California. A Santa Monica faction formed to advocate gaming for the tribe, a position opposed by the San Gabriel faction.

The San Gabriel council and the Santa Monica faction sued each other over allegations that the San Gabriel faction expelled some members to increase gaming shares for other members. There were allegations that the Santa Monica faction stole tribal records to support its case for federal recognition.

In September 2006, the Santa Monica faction divided into the "slash" and "hyphen" groups: the Gabrielino/Tongva Tribe and Gabrielino-Tongva Tribe. Tribal secretary Sam Dunlap and tribal attorney Jonathan Stein confronted each other over various alleged fiscal improprieties and derogatory comments made to each other. Since that time, the slash group has hired former state senator Richard Polanco as its chief executive officer. The hyphen group has allied with Stein and issued warrants for the arrest of Polanco and members of the slash group.

Stein's group (hyphen) and the Gabrielino-Tongva Tribe are based in Santa Monica. It has proposed a casino to be built in Garden Grove, California, approximately two miles south of Disneyland. In September 2007, the city council of Garden Grove unanimously rejected the casino proposal, instead choosing to build a water park on the land.

=== Land use issues ===
Controversies have arisen in contemporary California related to land-use issues and Native American rights, including those of the Tongva. Since the late twentieth century, both the state and the United States governments have shown respect for Indigenous rights and tribal sovereignty. The Tongva have challenged local development plans in court to protect and preserve some of their sacred grounds. Given the area's long Indigenous history, not all archaeological sites have been identified.

Sometimes land developers have inadvertently disturbed Tongva burial grounds. The tribe denounced archaeologists breaking bones of ancestral remains found during an excavation of a site at Playa Vista.

In the 1990s, the Gabrielino/Tongva Springs Foundation revived use of the Tongva Sacred Springs, also known as Kuruvungna Springs, for sacred ceremonies. The natural springs are located on the site of a former Tongva village, now developed as the campus of University High School in West Los Angeles. The Tongva consider the springs one of their last remaining sacred sites, and they regularly make them the centerpiece of ceremonial events.

The Tongva have another sacred area known as Puvungna. They believe it is the birthplace of the Tongva prophet Chingishnish, and many regard it as the place of creation. The site contains an active spring, and a Tongva village formerly inhabited the area. It has been developed as part of the grounds of California State University, Long Beach. A portion of Puvungna, a Tongva burial ground on the western edge of the campus, is listed on the National Register of Historic Places. In October 2019, following the dumping of soil, along with concrete, rebar and other debris, on "land that holds archaeological artefacts actively used by local Tribal groups for ceremonies" from a nearby construction site, the Juaneño Band of Mission Indians, Acjachemen Nation–Belardes (an organization that self-identifies as a Native American tribe), and the California Cultural Resource Preservation Alliance (CCRPA) filed a lawsuit against the university. In November 2019, the university agreed to stop dumping materials onto the site, and as of 2020 the lawsuit between these parties is still ongoing.

== Traditional narratives ==
Tongva/Gabrieleño/Fernandeño oral literature is relatively little known, due to their early Christianization in the 1770s by Spanish missions in California. The available evidence suggests strong cultural links with the group's linguistic kin and neighbors to the south and east, the Luiseño and the Cahuilla.

According to Kroeber (1925), the pre-Christian Tongva had a "mythic-ritual-social six-god pantheon". The principal deity was Chinigchinix, also known as Quaoar. Another important figure is Weywot, the god of the sky, whom Quaoar created. Weywot ruled over the Tongva, but he was very cruel, and his own sons finally killed him. When the Tongva assembled to decide what to do next, they had a vision of a ghostly being who called himself Quaoar, who said he had come to restore order and to give laws to the people. After he had given instructions regarding which groups would hold political and spiritual leadership, he began to dance and slowly ascended into heaven.

After consulting with the Tongva, astronomers Michael E. Brown and Chad Trujillo used the name of Quaoar to name a large object in the Kuiper belt that they had discovered, 50000 Quaoar (2002). When Brown later found a satellite of Quaoar, he left the choice of name up to the Tongva, who selected Weywot (2009).

== Toponymy ==
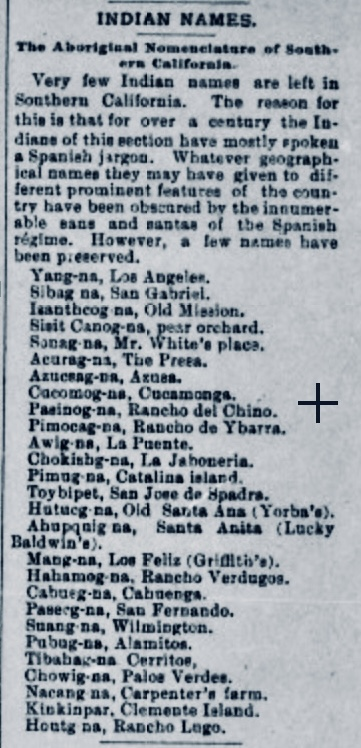
“Indian names: the aboriginal nomenclature of Southern California,” published in the Los Angeles Herald, 1893

Since the Spanish colonial period, Tongva place names have been widely adopted in Southern California. Examples include Pacoima, Tujunga, Topanga, Rancho Cucamonga, Azusa (Azucsagna), and Cahuenga Pass.

Sacred sites that have not been demolished, destroyed, or built over include Puvunga, Kuruvungna Springs, and Eagle Rock.

In other cases, toponyms or place names have been recently designated to honor Indigenous peoples. The Gabrielino Trail is a 28-mile (45 km) path through the Angeles National Forest, created and named in 1970.

A 2,656-foot (810 m) summit in the Verdugo Mountains, in Glendale, was named Tongva Peak in 2002, following a proposal by Richard Toyon.

Tongva Park is a 6.2-acre (2.5 ha) park in Santa Monica, California. The park is located just south of Colorado Avenue, between Ocean Avenue and Main Street. The park includes an amphitheater, playground, garden, fountains, picnic areas, and restrooms. The park was dedicated on October 13, 2013.

== Notable people ==
Contemporary Tongva people are listed under their specific groups.

- Victoria Reid (c. 1809–1868) was a woman from the village of Comicranga who became a respected landowner in Mexican California, before experiencing a decline in status in white American society. She was married to Hugo Reid.
- Toypurina (1760–1799) was a Kizh medicine woman who opposed the rule of colonization by Spanish missionaries in California, and led an unsuccessful rebellion against them in 1785.
- Julia Bogany (1948–2021) was a teacher, activist, and member of the Tongva tribe dedicated to the teaching, revitalization, and visibility of the Tongva language and culture.
- Tonantzin Carmelo is a Tongva film and television actress.

== See also ==
- Bibliography of Los Angeles
- Outline of the history of Los Angeles
- Bibliography of California history
- Chinigchinix
- Mission Indians
- Tongva populated places
