= Julia Bogany =

American educator from California, U.S. (1948–2021)

- Born: Julia Gaitan; July 16, 1948; Santa Monica, California
- Died: March 28, 2021 (aged 72)
- Citizenship: American
- Occupations: educator, community leader, cultural advisor

Julia Louise Gaitan Bogany (July 16, 1948 – March 28, 2021) was an American community leader. She was an educator, and cultural consultant, who identified as being Tongva.

== Early life ==
Julia Louise Gaitan was born in Santa Monica, California. Her mother was Josphine Gaitan, who Bogany identified as being Gabrielino and Acjachemen. She stated that her maternal grandmother Julia Lassos was a full-blood Tongva. Her uncle Julius registered her to the Gabrielino Tongva of San Gabriel Mission.

== Career ==
Bogany taught preschool for 35 years. From 2000 to 2021, Bogany was cultural affairs officer of the Gabrieleño-Tongva San Gabriel Band of Mission Indians, an unrecognized tribe in California.

She taught Tongva language, beading, and basket-weaving classes, and conducted cultural workshops throughout southern California. She worked on fetal alcohol spectrum disorder awareness in Native American communities. She was the founding president of Kuruvungna Sacred Springs, president of Residential Motivators, and vice president of Keepers of Indigenous Ways, all nonprofit organizations. She was active in the Children Court L.A. Round Table, the Santa Monica Conservancy 21st Century Task Force, and the California Native American College Board. She was Elder in Residence at Pitzer College and Pomona College.

Bogany received the Heritage Award from the Aquarium of the Pacific in 2010. The National Indian Child Welfare Association named her Champion for Native Children in 2019. Los Angeles City/County Native American Indian Commission recognized her with the Spirit of Tradition Award in 2020. In 2021, she received the California Missions Foundation's Chairman's Award.

Bogany wrote a children's book, Tongva Women Inspiring the Future, and contributed to the compilation of a Tongva dictionary. At California State University Dominguez Hills, there is a mural depicting Bogany under an oak tree, by artist iris yirei hu. Bogany was also featured on a billboard as part of artist Erin Yoshi's "Land of We" installation, and is depicted with her great-granddaughters in a mural by Audrey Chan, at the Little Tokyo/Arts District metro station in Los Angeles.

== Personal life ==
She had four children. When her children were grown, she married Andrew Bogany.

== Death ==
Bogany died in 2021, after a stroke. She was 72 years old.
