= Alano =

Alano may refer to:

- Alano Español, a dog breed
- Alano (name)
- Alano (motorcycle), an Italian motorcycle

== See also ==
- Alano club, a discreet name used for community centers where meetings of Alcoholics Anonymous and other 12 step recovery groups are held
- Alano di Piave, a comune in Veneto, Italy
