= Kelly Edzerza-Bapty =

Canadian First Nations architect

Kelly Edzerza-Bapty is a member of the Tāłtān Nation in Northwest British Columbia. Kelly is the founding principal of Obsidian Architecture, an Indigenous-owned and operated firm that specializes in architecture and design in the communities across British Columbia and the Yukon. She is the first Indigenous female architect from the Tāłtān Nation to achieve the Architectural Institute of British Columbia (AIBC) designation. Through her practice, Edzerza-Bapty focuses on Generational Architecture, a term that works towards "defining resilience and sustainability [in architecture] through an Indigenous lens". In addition to architectural work, Edzerza-Bapty is also the co-creator of ReMatriate, an organization that seeks to render Indigenous Women visibly empowered.

== Tāłtān Nation ==
Edzerza-Bapty is a member of the Tāłtān Nation, stewards of the Stikine watershed that feeds the Pacific Ocean. The traditional and unceded land base accounts for 11.24 percent of British Columbia’s “claimed” land base. The Tāłtān Nation holds a “Declaration of Nation” from 1910 in which their Nannock (Head Chief) and 84 other members of the Tāłtān Nation state that their land is separate from the land that is presently referred to as British Columbia. Both Edzerza-Bapty’s great-great-grandfather (Nannock) and great-grandfather are signatories of the declaration.

Edzerza-Bapty is the granddaughter of the Tahlogo Dena Etzenlee Matriarch, of the Tu’da Che’yonne (Wolf-Eagle) Clan, a matrilineal-based society where property and hunting areas are passed down through the women's lines. As the youngest daughter of the youngest daughter from a family of twenty children and a member of the Wolf-Eagle Clan, Edzerza-Bapty has an obligation to support the future generations by assuring their strength is carried forward by mending and regenerating their cultural continuum.

== Early life and education ==
Edzerza-Bapty grew up in Inuvik, Northwest Territories while spending portions of her youth with her family in Telegraph Creek. Her experience living in remote, northern communities revealed to her “how a single space can serve multiple purposes and how its design could affect the mood.”

Edzerza-Bapty’s mother recognized her potential in design and encouraged her to pursue architecture as a career. As a result, Edzerza-Bapty attended the University of Alberta to receive a Bachelor in Design. Following her undergraduate degree, Edzerza-Bapty joined an architectural firm in Whitehorse, Yukon where she worked on many First Nations’ projects.

After working in Whitehorse, Yukon, Edzerza-Bapty attended the University of British Columbia School of Architecture and Landscape Architecture, receiving her Master of Architecture in 2010. During her time at UBC, Edzerza-Bapty found there was little information or mentorship offered at the school regarding Indigenous designs and structures. As a result, Edzerza-Bapty developed her own architectural approach through research of land titles and policies to determine how different First Nations’ governance works, and how traditional structures are built and maintained. Eventually, her approach grew into what she now calls, Generational Architecture.

== Architecture ==
In 2019, Edzerza-Bapty became the first female Indigenous architect from a British Columbia nation to receive the AIBC Architect designation and is the founding principal architect at Obsidian Architecture.

Obsidian Architecture is a female-first, Indigenous-owned and operated firm working primarily with First Nations across the Yukon and British Columbia. Edzerza-Bapty leads Obsidian Architecture through a gradual, community-led design approach, creating regionally specific designs that serve the needs of the specific Nations. Edzerza-Bapty prioritizes this "slowed-down" approach to architecture to build trust with the community that her practice is working with.

"I ask for different groups of elders, often in gender split, and local Indigenous language speakers, as well as the members that are running the programming in communities. We try to do at least a full-day workshop with youth in the community each time we come in: we’ll run model-building workshops, and design-thinking sessions with iPads, markers, laptops with 3D building files. These youthful contributions to the design process, programming, and final project are valuable. In this participatory approach, we’re thinking about [buildings] in terms of being in place for several generations, of having that longevity and durability. We are investing in ‘generational architecture’ and ‘generational building."

=== Generational Architecture ===
Edzerza-Bapty's term, 'Generational Architecture' is "a way to consider what it means to design communities and buildings that will be here for our [human] future generations." The approach uses landscapes, ancestry, and languages, to create the potential for indigenous communities to re-establish their presence and re-build their communities.

An example, of Edzerza-Bapty's approach to generational architecture is seen through her innovation in response to BC's accelerating history of wildfires where she had the opportunity to reconsider their approach to working "in a world where natural disasters and environmental changes are becoming more frequent". Bapty and her team developed a strategy to harvest wood charred from the forest fires for construction which were ultimately kiln-dried timber once the burnt portions are removed. This holistic approach to salvaging the wood not only reduced the risk of future fires in the area, but it also accelerates the forest's regeneration acting as a restorative approach to land management. This strategy was put into use for the design of the Nzen’man’ Child and Family Development Centre for the Nlaka’pamux community in the southern interior of BC. The use of the charred timber in combination with the vernacular form of a traditional pit house and Indigenous and passive design strategies results with a significantly reduced carbon footprint, serving as a model of "Generational Architecture".

=== Select projects ===
Name	Location	Completed	Description	Client	Collaborators
Kaska Dena: Cultural Centre for Daylu Dena Community	Lower Post, BC	2016 – under construction	27,000-square-foot facility that will serve the Kaska Dena Nation by providing recreational, cultural, and administrative spaces.	Kaska Dena Nation	Obsidian Architecture, SMK Architect
Nzen’man’ Child and Family Development Centre	Inklucksheen Reserve, BC	2017 – under construction	Designed to bring all of the Nlaka’pamux community organizations into one building facility.	Nlaka’pamux community	Obsidian Architecture
Golden House		2017			Indigenous Design Studio
Tsawout Nation Bighouse	Central Saanich	2020–2022	Serves as a community gathering space and spiritual centre.	Tsawout Nation	Obsidian Architecture, Scott Kemp Architect

== Advocacy ==
In addition, to Edzerza-Bapty's work as an architect, she is also the initiating co-founder of ReMatriate Collective, an organization dedicated to empowering Indigenous women. The organization began as an Indigenous Wom(y/x)ns visual identity campaign and developed into a collective advocating for Indigenous women.

"The Collective believes it is important to enable Indigenous women to control the visual representation of their identities through active participation in the online space"

and is composed of a diverse group of female fashion designers, singers, models, architects, artists, and advocates. The formation of the collective was a direct response to the stereotypes and appropriation of Indigenous cultures that have been taking away Indigenous peoples' rights and ability to authentically represent their cultures such as fashion designer DSquared's "DSquaw" collection. Through a collection of online visual arts through social media and a decolonizing movement, ReMatriate intends to move the conversation around Indigenous women in the media to a more positive space by putting Indigenous women in charge of how they are represented and portrayed.

In 2017, Edzerza-Bapty was featured in the book of essays written by indigenous women, NotYourPrincess, which covered topics such as sexual abuse, drug use, discrimination, and silence.

Edzerza-Bapty is also involved in youth mentorship and advocacy for environmental and indigenous rights.
