= Alano (name) =

Alano is both a surname and a given name. It is the Spanish and Italian cognate of Alan. Notable people with the name include:

Surname:

- Alyssa Alano (born 1987), Filipino actress
- Boy Alano (born 1944), Filipino actor
- Kat Alano (born 1985), English-Filipino actress and model

Given name:

- Alano Edzerza (born 1981), Tahltan artist and entrepreneur
- Alano Miller (born 1980), American actor
- Alano Montanari, Italian motorcycle racer
