= Rematriation =

Term in Indigenous feminist studies

The term rematriation describes the process of "returning to the sacred Mother". This returning specifically refers to the restoring of relationships between Indigenous peoples and their ancestral lands and artifacts (typically through the repossession of those lands and items), the use of traditional and cultural Indigenous knowledge to care for the Earth, and the honoring of Indigenous matrilineal systems. A theoretical concept initially introduced in 1988 by Native feminist author Lee Maracle, rematriation is by Indigenous women and adopted by Native collectives, artists, organizations, as well as many land trusts. It has also become a concept adopted and applied by academic spheres across disciplines. Many academics have come to believe that rematriation in itself implies the need for rekindling and fostering relationships with nature and underrepresented communities, and continued action to shift colonial, heteropatriarchal, binary systems. Steven Newcomb (Lenape) discusses the act of rematriation as restoring "a living culture to its rightful place on Mother Earth" or the restoring of "a people to a spiritual way of life, in sacred relationship with their ancestral lands, without external interference" (Healing, Restoration, and Rematriation). Rematriation is practiced as a cyclical pattern that focuses on four characteristics which allow for research reflexivity: growth and healing, inspiring change, reflection, and (re)birth (Gauthier, 148).

== Origin ==
Rematriation stems from a reframing of the concept of repatriation. The new word was first introduced in 1988 by Stó:lō author Lee Maracle, in the manuscript for her book, I Am Woman. She used the term to decolonize the process of repatriation. While both repatriation and rematriation describe the returning of cultural items and/or lands to the Indigenous groups from which they originated, the latter reframes the concept in terms of the matrilineal structure of many Indigenous groups. In honoring the societies structured around women, rematriation opposes the colonial and patriarchal dynamics and systems of violence embedded in the use of repatriation. This shift in terminology is mainly cultural, as most laws and policies still remain under the term repatriation. Headed by Indigenous women, the concept of rematriation morphed into a broader social movement for uplifting the voices and knowledge of Indigenous women and restoring the relationships between Indigenous peoples and their ancestral lands.

== Academia ==
=== Feminist scholarship ===
The concept of rematriation was introduced in a manuscript-turned-book self-identified to be a "Native perspective on Sociology and Feminism". Lee Maracle's initial 1988 manuscript, turned 1996 published book titled I Am Woman, (subtitled the previous), was the first traceable introduction of the word rematriation. Introduced in this way, the concept easily became a topic of discussion within feminist discourse and academia.

Rematriation has become adopted as a core aspect of the ethics of care being used in feminist writing, activism, and scholarship. This feminist ethics of care, in turn, has been adopted by many interdisciplinary departments in academia, and is used by anthropologists, sociologists, and others performing research through a feminist lens. Feminist academics have continued to conceptualize rematriation, and some have come to believe it reaches further than the act of returning land or an item. For them, it also symbolizes a responsibility, after the act of return, to continue interacting with and uplifting the communities who are underrepresented; it symbolizes a responsibility for aiding in systematic change. These widening ideas of rematriation continued the discourse, connecting colonial systems of patriarchy to a plethera of social issues (such as the right of women to vote, the isolation of Native communities due to their matriarchial systems, the targeting of Black individuals by police and institutions of power, etc.).

Feminism is differentiated from rematriation, while some scholars argue for the reliance on Native feminism for rematriation, others argue against the use of the two terms together as antonymous. Feminism was established for and by white women explicitly (Ramirez, 25) and fails to incorporate the cultural specifications that rematriation relies on. Because feminism frequently lacks the cultural connections to Native Nations, some argue that the danger lies within assimilation of Native women specific challenges into the broader scope of feminism, ultimately erasing important cultural and ecological connections (Trask, 1996).

=== Environmental scholarship ===
Rematriation is also a concept highly discussed and practiced within ecological and environmental spheres, such as Biology, Environmental studies, Geology, Archaeology, and Environmental law. Like in feminist spheres, the continued discourse opened up ideas of what the term meant and implied, and the two come to the same core idea: that rematriation denotes the responsibility of fostering relationships and continued action. Many in ecological and environmental spheres have brought rematriation into practice and theory by examining humanity's (down to each individual person) relationship with nature and the Earth, and working to reconnect people, systems, and processes back to nature. These projects and discussions have come to develop their own practices and concepts related to rematriation, for example human-nature binary and seed rematriation. Human-nature binary is the idea that colonial systems of thinking have created a cognitive separation between humans and the rest of nature and our ecosystem; the way to decolonize and shift these ways of thinking ideas of human versus subhuman species is engaging in rematriation. Many of these ecological and environmental minds have applied rematriation, the returning to the sacred mother, to the concept of Mother Nature to point to a disconnect formed between humans and the rest of our biological and ecological kin. The reconnection of human and nature starts with rematriation processes, sometimes in the form of rematriating knowledge; uplifting and returning to ancestral and indigenous knowledge systems acts to rematriate knowledge, especially surrounding indigenous connections to the Earth.

Many of the concepts brought to rematriation have been applied to issues surrounding the global climate crisis, and practicing rematriation has become another way for people to be more climate-conscious. Rematriation and climate change are inherently intertwined because the environmental effects of climate change disproportionately impact the Native and Indigenous communities centered by rematriation efforts. This is due to their unique relationship with and reliance on the Earth and its natural systems, and their higher morbidity rates from inequitable access to healthcare and other medical resources.

Ecological and environmental disciplines have begun the process of rematriating by the growing inclusion of Indigenous Traditional Ecological Knowledge (ITEK) into discussions, teaching practices, and research.

==== Seed rematriation ====
Seed rematriation is an aspect of rematriation efforts within agricultural practices and fields. It describes the specific action of rematriating seeds to the lands they originated, and therefore simultaneously returning native plants and the cultural traditions that surround them to indigenous groups. This has also become an interdisciplinary discussion across agriculture, law, anthropology, etc. These have all prompted questions about whether rematriation is the answer for how to work to reverse climate change and simultaneously begin shifting cultural perceptions and representations.

== Use of the term ==
ReMatriate Collective is the name of a non-profit, multi-media initiative that aims to put the concept of rematriation into practice through film production, content creation, and community engagement and outreach specifically designed for Indigenous audiences. Founded by Michelle Schenandoah, the initiative began with Rematriation Magazine, eventually expanding to include more avenues of storytelling. As a community of Haudenosaunee and Indigenous women, rematriation works to shift harmful and simplified narratives, defy stereotypes, and use personal experiences for positive change and connection. In addition to its name and Indigenous heritage, the group interacts with the concept of rematriation through furthering education and creating gatherings and spaces for Indigenous women and their experiences. Through the uplifting of these underrepresented voices, they aim to recenter Indigenous communities and raise awareness about human's need to live in balance with Mother Earth.

Rematriation is also the name of a 2022 documentary film describing the threat of logging to British Columbia's last untouched old-growth forest, Fairy Creek (Ada'itsx) on Vancouver Island, and the indigenous-led protests that followed.

Many land trust organizations actively publicize their support for the rematriation movement. For example, the Sogorea Te' Land Trust introduced the "Rematriate the Land Fund", which produces and obtains funds specifically dedicated to funding the return of stewardship of Indigenous lands and all related costs. They, too, have actively publicized the importance of the movement, erecting billboards (in conjunction with the NDN Collective) reading "REMATRIATE THE LAND".

Sogorea Te' Land Trust also used rematriation as a means of addressing systemic violence that still affects Indigenous communities in contemporary climates. Such an example is the Trust's honoring of Jakelin Caal Maquin, a "seven-year-old Qʼeqchiʼ (Guatemalan) that passed away unjustly while in custody of US border patrol" (Sogorea Te' Land Trust, Lisjan).

== Cultural significance ==
Rematriation is also a concept in works of art by indigenous artists or those honoring indigenous peoples. One example is that of Metís artist and researcher Lara Felsing. Felsing's projects focus on the use and projection of three three concepts: kinship, reciprocity, and rematriation. In her 2023 exhibition Blanket Ceremony for the Forest, Felsing describes using the concept of rematriation through the inclusion of historical wool blankets in the patchwork blankets that were wrapped around trees. She purchased the blankets from a local museum after they were discovered stored with other rations in case of a nuclear attack during the 1950s nuclear scares. She describes her use of the blankets as an act of returning to the sacred mother by writing:

"[t]hey are for sale after being unboxed—after being discovered in the basement of the post office, initially stored along with food and medical supplies in the event of a nuclear attack. I wanted to apply the same gesture of safety and protection to the forest that the National Security Strategic Stockpile reserved for the humans in this area back in 1952."

— Lara Felsing, Wâhkôhtowin: Gestures in Kinship, Reciprocity, and Rematriation, pg. 101

Rematriation also serves the larger community as an avenue in which to expand the revitalization of cultural practices. While majority of these cultural performances relate to ecological efforts, rematriation also applies to performative histories as means of reconnecting with matricultures, such as stories, pottery, basket weaving, music, and more. Coined by Tina Passman (1993), matricultures is dedicated to egalitarian cultures which employ maternal values of relationality as the moral principle for all individuals and peoples. Despite the long Indigenous historical records of societies organized in this way, colonial structures have attempted to erase such ways of relating through establishing patriarchal hierarchies within Indigenous communities through extractive tools such as allotment. Rematriation is a tool for many of the descendant communities of matricultures to return to their cultural roots and spiritual practices that align with their traditional organizations (Wolfstone, 4–6).

As previously mentioned, music is an important expression for Indigenous activism and rematriation. Artists such as Joanne Shenandoah (Oneida), Pura Fé (Tuscarora/Tiano), and Ulali use music to address and interject international conversations of social justice and environmental issues through Indigenous women-led perspectives (Rematriation). Employing these perspectives through musical outlets works to highlight endemics that heavily affect First Nations' communities such as Missing and Murdered Indigenous Peoples/Women (MMIP/MMIW). 'Missing You,' by Joanne Shenandoah, addresses MMIW through a lens of rematriation by employing an Indigenous Woman's perspectives and emotions towards such an unfathomable violence that plagues Indian country. By employing music as a means of rematriation, women are able to reestablish themselves as storytellers, keepers of knowledge, and healers – important roles within the traditional matriarchal systems.

Many of these performative traditions use rematriation as an outlet for addressing the systemic violences that are generated from the industrialization and capitalizing of Tribal lands. A 1996 report conducted by the Indian and Northern Affairs Canada (INAC) found that women ages 25–44 with Indigenous status "are five times more likely than other women of the same age to die as the result of Violence" (NWAC, 5). Sexual violence is also prevalent amongst industrial development as highlighted by the Dakota Access Pipeline (DAPL). A product of the Energy Transfer, the DAPL continues colonial violence by means of dispossession of Native lands for monetary gain while also providing a 'safe haven' for registered sex offenders and human traffickers. This issue stems from the companies erection of temporary worker camps or "man camps" that see the frequent failing of offenders registering with the Tribe and living on or near Tribal lands (Deer and Nagle, 36). Extractive industries also fail to acknowledge and address the violence that their companies bring to Indigenous communities which mimics the broader issue of reconciliation where many First Peoples find these practices as an attempt of assimilation rather than the transformation of structures to prohibit the continuity of assaults (Schmidt, 6). The call for rematriation challenges the idea that "traditional indigenous womxn [are] silent and obedient to male authority" proposed by colonial heteropatriarchal influences (Schmidt, 9). Rematriation refocuses the discussion onto women as powers of transformative change and leaders within their communities, working to decolonize the harmful narratives of Indigenous women as subservient. Rematriation is not just about the returning to the Sacred Mother, but it includes returning cultural practices, matriarchal lineages, and overall respect for Native women.

Language is also an important avenue for which to expand rematriation efforts. Anthropology, especially the subfield of archaeology, has been a tool employed by the nation-state to rewrite and erase the histories of Native communities often through the idea that Indigenous people are stuck within the confines of history. This can be seen in the many successful instances of settler-colonial erasure of First Nations' languages. Archaeologists and linguistic anthropologists have historically contributed to this issue by means of language databases and archives based on colonial practices. Majority of these problems stem from objective uses of Indigenous knowledge and languages such as the sharing of sacred materials outside of the community and failure to share these materials with the appropriate individuals who should have access to them (Meissner, 14). Indigenous activists argue that academic institutions, especially universities, must rematriate language archives. This unique facet of rematriation displays how the practice differentiates itself from feminism; rematriation demands the (re)establishment of Indigenous sovereignty and self-determination.
