= Audrey Chan =

Audrey Chan (born 1982) is a Chinese-American Los Angeles–based artist, writer, and educator known for her research-based projects that articulate political and cultural identities through her allegorical narrative and the feminist construct of "the personal is political." Her works include paintings, digital compositions, installation, video, public performance, murals and symposiums.

== Biography ==
Audrey Chan was born in 1982 in Chicago, Illinois. She received her Bachelor of Art degree from Swarthmore College in 2004 and a Master of Fine Arts degree from California Institute of the Arts 2007. In 2013, Chan received the Fellowship for Visual Artisists from the California Community Foundation (CCF) for her Los Angeles–based artistic contribution and commitment. In the same year, she was also the grant recipient of the Artists' Resource for Completion for her collaborative work with Elana Mann.

== Career ==
Early in her career as an artist, Chan was an artist-in-residence at the Nantes School of Fine Arts, or École Régionale des Beaux-Arts de Nantes, in France. In France, Chan performed an artistic investigation of the official portrait of President Nicolas Sarkozy, a subject that sparked debate about the ownership of images and the delicate relationship between politics and art in French law. Her work was later published in the book Conseil juridique et artistique / Legal and Artistic Counsel. As a writer, Chan has published a number of articles in the magazines East of Borneo and Afterall. These articles include "Reports from a Strange Democracy: Guillermo Gómez-Peña," which reviews the artistic performance of Guillermo Gómez-Peña, and "Rupture and Continuity in Feminist Re-performance," which discusses the value of re-performance as a means of producing an embodied relationship with the past. Besides, Chan is currently co-editor of the zine Would Be Saboteurs Take Heed which centers the voices of AAPI (Asian American and Pacific Islander) artists and writers. As an educator, Chan was a visiting faculty member of the California Institute of the Arts and a gallery teacher at the J. Paul Getty Museum in Los Angeles.

== Works ==
1. Chinatown Abecedario: A Folk Taxonomy of L.A.'s Chinatown: In this video, Chan deconstructed Chinatown's shrouded myths and histories and performed the fundamentals of Chinese culture in Chinatown through the video Chinatown Abecedario: A Folk Taxonomy of L.A.'s Chinatown. This video is also featured in the Chinese American Museum as part of its 2012 group exhibition.
2. Chan's Mannese Theater: The Chan's Mannese Theater is the "3 Solo Projects: Audrey Chan, Elana Mann, Chan & Mann" at the Ben Maltz Gallery, Otis College of Art and Design. This project is a video installation incorporating a painted theater and a video screening room that projects the video Chan & Mann's New Fantasy (The Video).
3. Metro Station Art: Chan is currently working ona public artwork for the new Regional Connector subway station in the historic Little Tokyo neighborhood of Downtown Los Angeles that will open in 2021.
