= Alano Edzerza =

Canadian Tahltan artist and entrepreneur

Alano Edzerza (born 1981 in Victoria, British Columbia) is a Tahltan artist and entrepreneur. He is a member of the Ganhada tribe and Edzerza's work has been shown in multiple exhibitions and museums.

== Early and personal life ==
Alano Edzerza was born into the Ganhada tribe during 1981 in Victoria, British Columbia. He was involved with art from a young age, as his family was involved in the art world. Edzerza attended the Victoria School Aboard, where he won his first sculpture award at the age of thirteen. After this, he continued to work on his artwork and began exhibiting his work, while working in Northwest Coast art under the supervision of his family member, Terrance Campbell. He continued his career until he was able to present his own art work to the public by designing art accessories to the people. Edzerza has worked with organizations such as the Knowledgeable Aboriginal Youth Association (KAYA), where he teaches art to youth. Edzerza currently lives in Downtown Vancouver, where he manages his companies, and works through retail art work.

== Career ==
Following his award at the age of thirteen, Edzerza began exhibiting work under the supervision of Campbell, a family member and fellow artist. He wanted to expand his knowledge of jewelry making, so Edzerza traveled to Arizona in 2002 to learn from Rick Charlie. He also began creating glass designs, which were met with enough success that he started promoting his fashion clothing. Eight years later in 2010, during the Olympic Games, Edzerza launched a sportswear outfit for the Dutch Olympic team. He also noticed that his work was being collected by both artists and non-artists, so he launched his own company and retail website for consumers to buy items at retail price.

When creating his artwork Edzerza uses his family and heritage as an inspiration, basing them on the region his family came from and on symbols used by his ancestors. He also chose to develop his presentation style by utilizing objects used in a person's daily life, such as jewelry or clothing. He has stated that his goal is to expand his art by designing fashion featuring tribal symbols. Edzerza has also espoused that he wants to show "other artists native and non native alike that we all can create successful business from our talents." In addition, during Edzerza's art career, others well known experience artists has point on how Shawn Hun and Edzerza's art work is one of kind due to their unique style of painting. Alano and Phil Gray were both studying Tsimshian form-line in where they started their career in making all their work based on this tribe.

== Select artwork ==
- Mosquito, Red Cedar, Acrylic
- Aslmon Post Earnings, Sterling Silver
- In or Out, Limited Edition Giclee
- Salmon Roe Pendant, Sterling Silver
- Chief of the Sea Box, Sandblasted Glass, Red Cedar
- Raven and the First Women, Sandblasted Glass, Red Cedar, Acrylic, Stainless steel Standoffs
- Wise Frog-Panel, Sandblasted Glass, Red Cedar, Acrylic, Stainless Steel
- Moving Forward, Limited Edition Giclee
- Eagle Dancer, Serigraph
- The Chief, Limited Edition Giclee
- Killerwhale Drum, Limited Edition Giclee
- Mosquito Drum, Limited Edition Giclee

== Select exhibitions ==
- “Moving Forward", Stonington Gallery (2015)
- "Native Fashion Now", traveling group exhibition
  - Peabody Essex Museum (2015)
  - Portland Art Museum (2016)
  - National Museum of the American Indian (2017)
