= ReMatriate Collective =

Organization for indigenous women in Canada

The ReMatriate Collective (created in 2015) is an Indigenous women's collective that uses social media to connect Indigenous peoples, particularly women, through art interventions. The collective is composed of women across Western and Northern Canada.

== Projects ==
=== Artworks and exhibitions ===
ReMatriate participated in the exhibition Beginning with the Seventies: Collective Acts, September 4, 2018 – December 2, 2018 at the Morris and Helen Belkin Art Gallery in Vancouver, British Columbia. Dana Claxton imposed images of the collective's members onto an archival image that references the Service, Office and Retail Workers' Union of Canada (SORWUC) 1978 protest action against the Muckamuck Restaurant.

In 2019, ReMatriate guest curated the exhibition qaʔ yəxʷ – water honours us: Womxn and Waterways, April 10 – October 2, 2019, at the Bill Reid Gallery of Northwest Coast Art. The exhibition focuses on the connection between "womxn and water in the matriarchal societies of the Northwest Coast, with special attention to the roles of child-bearers, healers, and doulas."

=== Events ===
2015 – Adäka Cultural Festival – Whitehorse, Yukon.
