= Tehuacán-Cuicatlán Biosphere Reserve =

Biosphere reserve in Mexico

- Reserva de la biosfera Tehuacán-Cuicatlán
- IUCN category VI (protected area with sustainable use of natural resources)
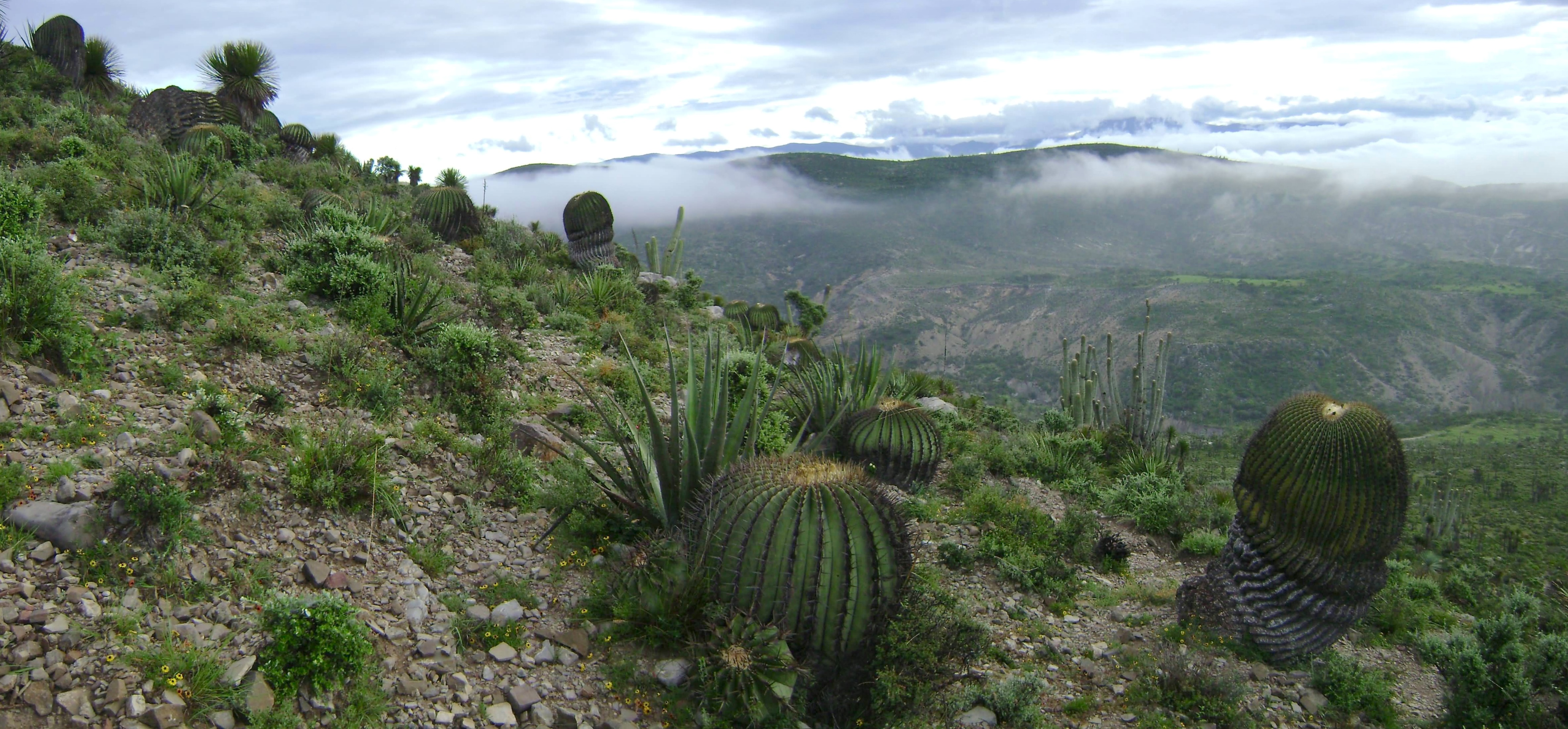

- Location within Mexico
- Location: Oaxaca, and Puebla, Mexico
- Nearest city: Tehuacán
- Coordinates: 18°12′41″N 97°23′58″W
- Area: 4,900 km^{2} (1,900 mi^{2})
- Established: 2012

UNESCO World Heritage Site
- Official name: Tehuacán-Cuicatlán Valley: originary habitat of Mesoamerica
- Type: Mixed
- Criteria: (iv), (x)
- Designated: 2018
- Reference no.: 1534
- Region: North America

The Tehuacán-Cuicatlán biosphere reserve is a protected natural area located in southeastern Mexico. Its name derives from its two main locations: Cuicatlán and Tehuacán, in the latter are their administrative offices, covers 490,186 hectares distributed among 21 municipalities in the state of Puebla and Oaxaca.

On July 2, 2018, the site was listed as a UNESCO World Heritage Site.

== Geography ==
The broad Tehuacán and Cuicatlán valleys extend northwest–southeast, between the Sierra Madre de Oaxaca to the east and the Sierra Mixteca to the west. Almost all of the reserve is in the basin of the Salado River, which flows southeastward through the Tehuacán and Cuicatlán valleys. The Cuicatlán Valley is partly in the basin northwestward-flowing Grande River, which joins the Salado to form the Santo Domingo River. The Santo Domingo flows eastward through the Sierra Madre de Oaxaca to join the Papaloapan, one of the largest rivers of Mexico. The Salado and Grande rivers receive waters of numerous streams that originate in the neighboring sierras.

The Sierra Madre de Oaxaca consists of several sub-ranges: Sierra Zongolica in the north, Mazatec Sierra in the middle and the Sierra Juárez in the south. The most outstanding mountain range is the Sierra Zongolica and the Sierra Mazatec, which is characterized by its karst topography cut by deep canyons.

== Climate ==
The climate of the region is warm semi-dry and warm semi-tropical in the region of the Cuicatec with moderate rains scarce in the summer. In the high parts of the mountains it is common to see that the mountains are topped by a thick fog that rarely comes to condense in the form of a modest drizzle.

== Ecology ==
The importance of Tehuacán-Cuicatlán lies in the great floristic diversity of the area. Contrary to popular belief, dry tropical regions that abound in southeastern Mexico are not poor in biodiversity. Some studies, such as those by Rzedowski in 1973 and 1978, have led to the conceptualization of the area as a Floristic Province, belonging to the Mexican xerophytic Phytogeographical Region. In 1965, Smith had suggested that a third of the plant species that populate the surface of Tehuacán-Cuicatlán valleys were endemic.

The predominant flora in the Tehuacán Valley is scrubland or matorral, part of the Tehuacán Valley matorral ecoregion, comprising more than a third of the species recorded. Tropical dry deciduous forest, an outlier of the Balsas dry forests ecoregion, covers the Cuicatlán Valley. The mountain slopes are home to oak and pine–oak forests, part of the Sierra Madre de Oaxaca pine–oak forests to the east and the Sierra Madre del Sur pine–oak forests to the west. Wetter areas on the mountain slopes are home to pockets of cloud forest.

One of the most exceptional ecological features from the Tehuacán-Cuicatlán valley is its columnar cacti forest, one of the highest concentrations of columnar cacti in the world. Forty-five of the seventy species reported in Mexico are in this central portion of the country. These species are the dominant component in a total of nine plant communities which are mostly endemic to Tehuacán-Cuicatlán. The area also contains xeric shrub, tropical deciduous forest, pine forest, pine-oak, and cloud forest.

Among vertebrates, the biosphere reserve has 18 fish species and 27 amphibian species, which is a high diversity compared to the deserts of North America and Australia. It has also 85 reptile species, of which 20 are endemic and 338 bird species, of which 16 are endemic.

Due to its endemic species, endangered species, and its rare floristic species, the site is an IUCN world biodiversity hotspot.

== Archeology ==
The Tehuacán-Cuicatlán valley is an important archeological site, which records 12,000 years of human inhabitation. There is ancient evidence of plant domestication, as well as the earliest known irrigation works in Mesoamerica, which include a diverse array of terraces, canals, wells, aqueducts and dams. The UNESCO World Heritage designation – Tehuacán-Cuicatlán Valley: originary habitat of Mesoamerica – recognizes the valley's outstanding biodiversity and its archeological significance.

== Gallery ==
Flora in Tehuacán-Cuicatlán Biosphere Reserve

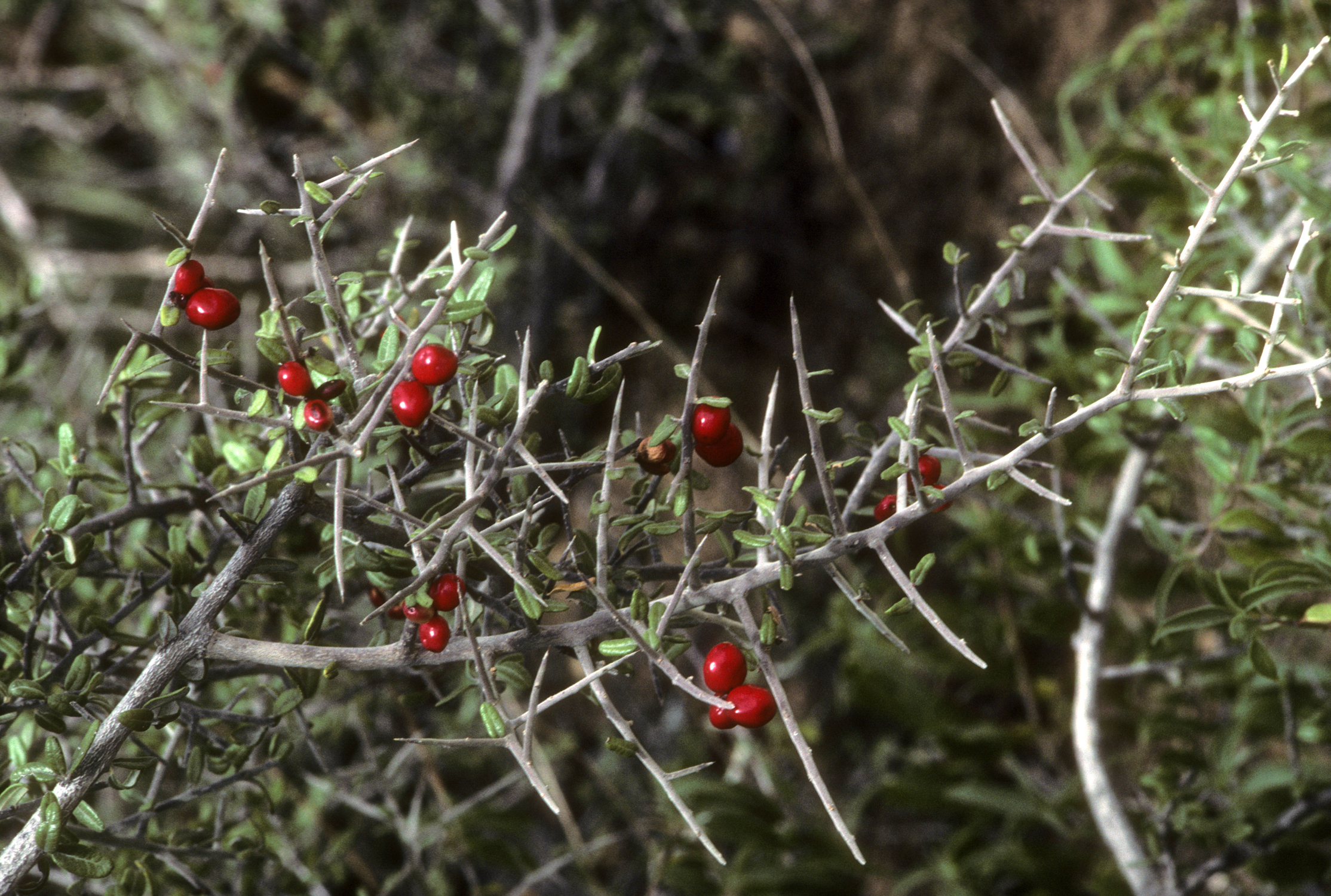
Castela tortuosa

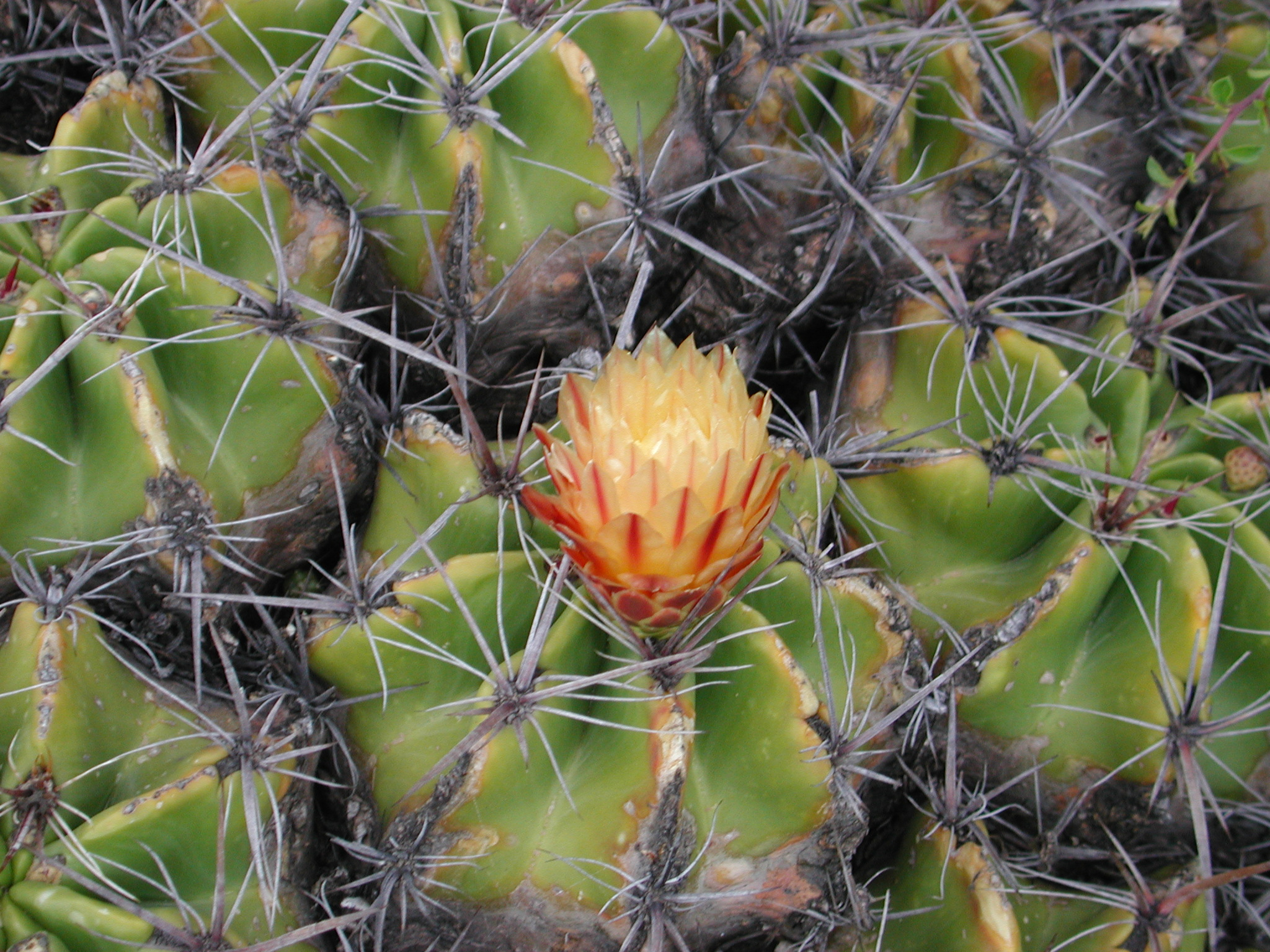
Ferocactus robustus

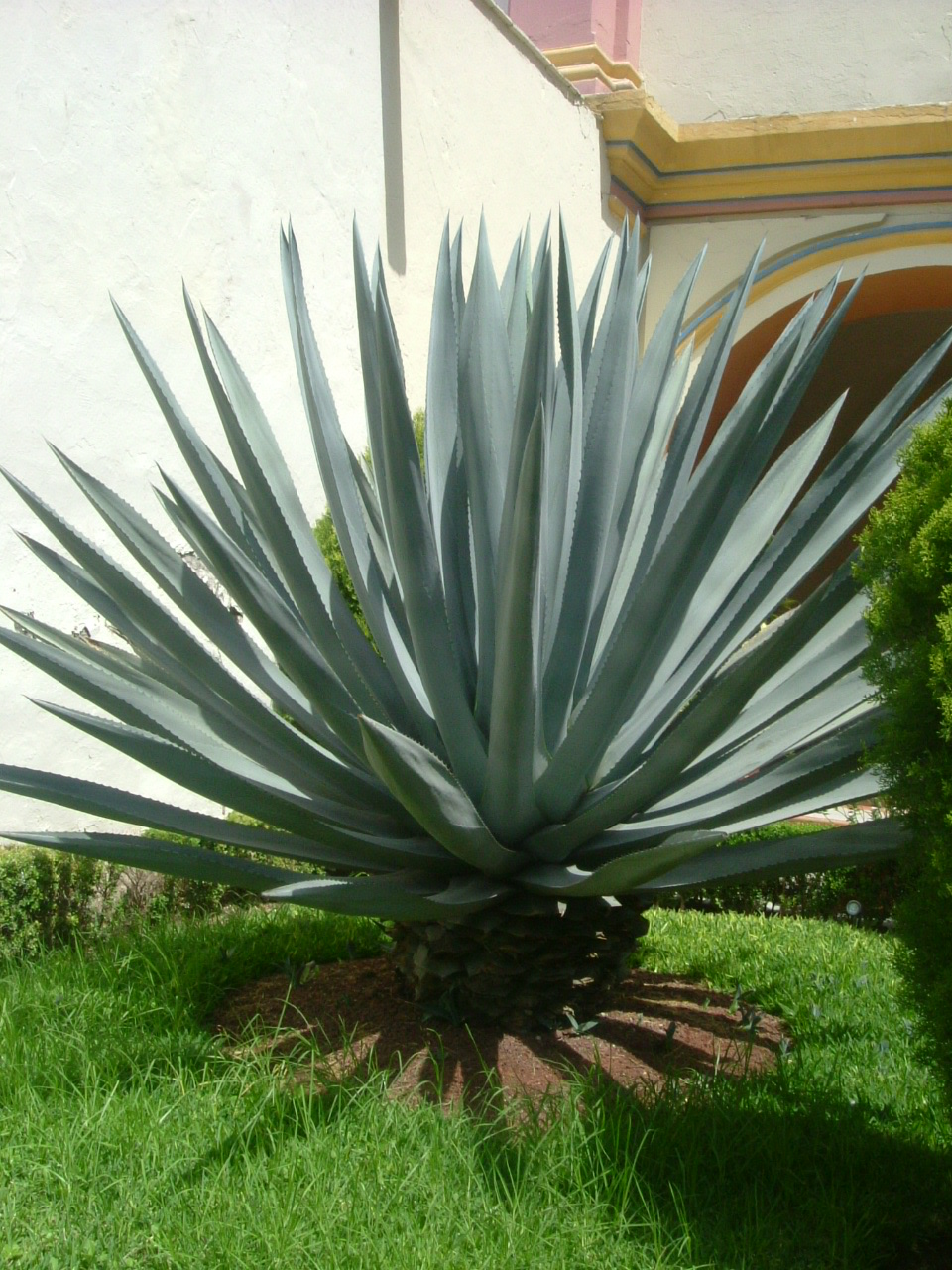
Agave spp.

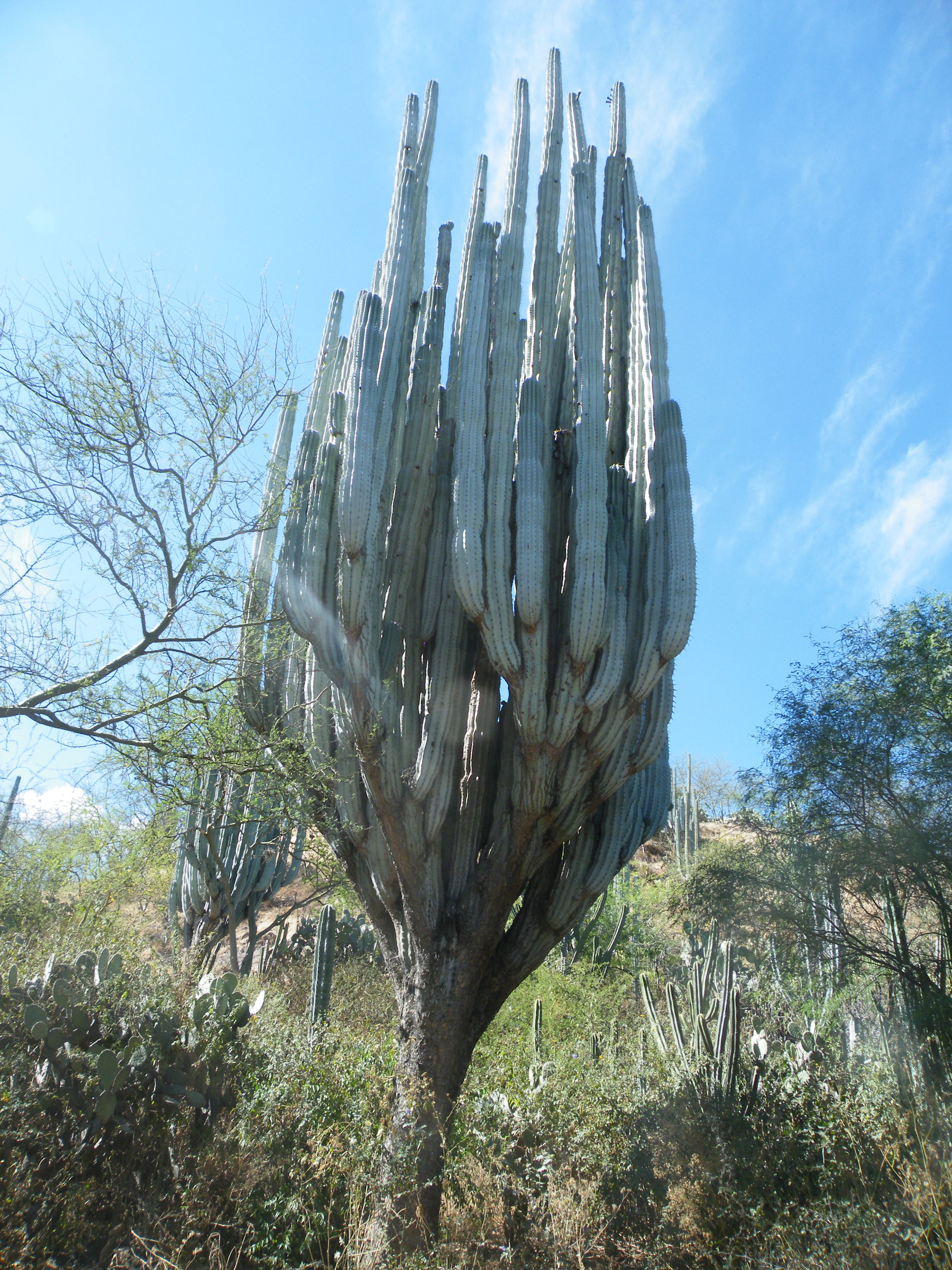
Pachycereus weberi

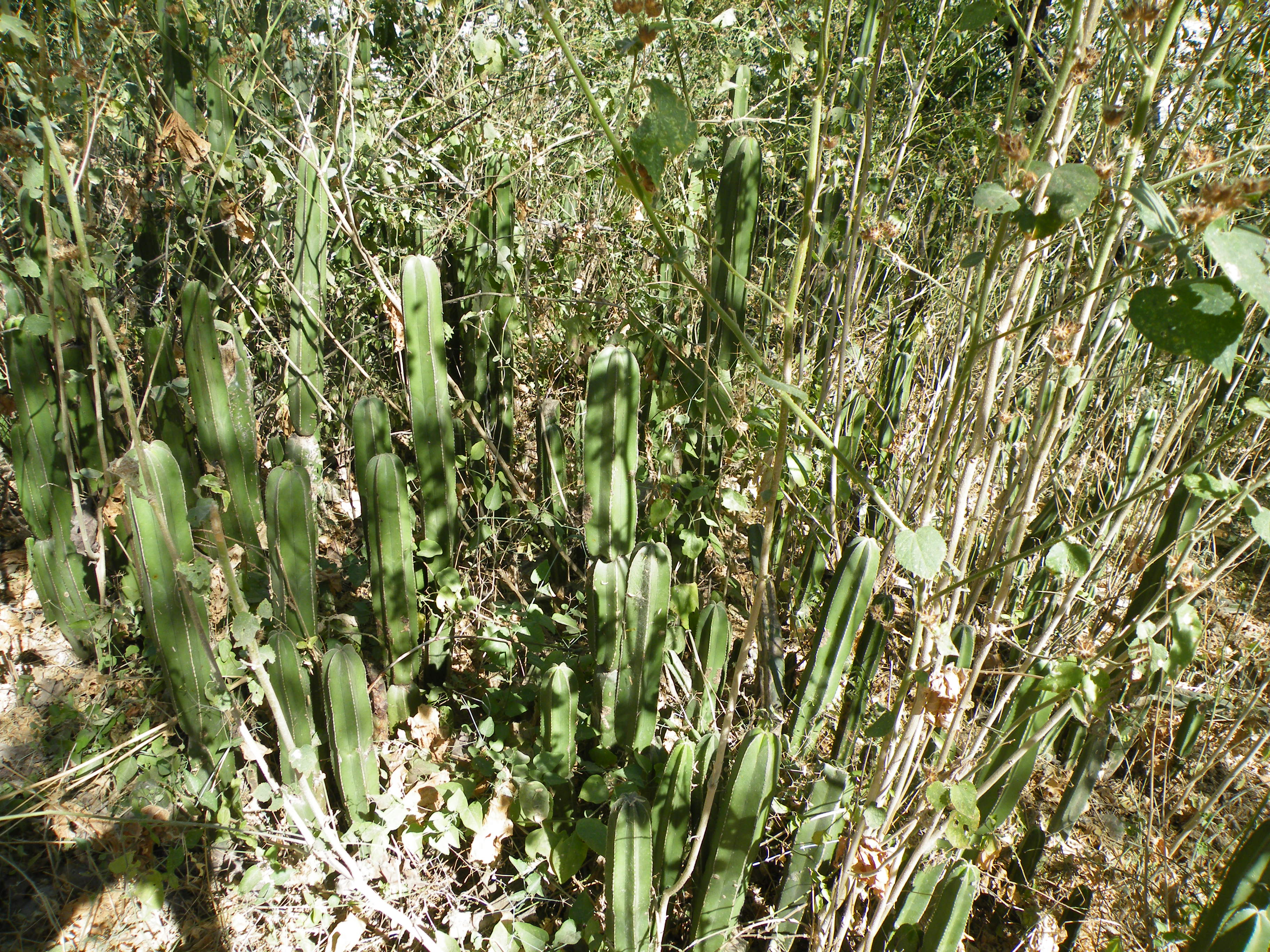
Pachycereus marginatus

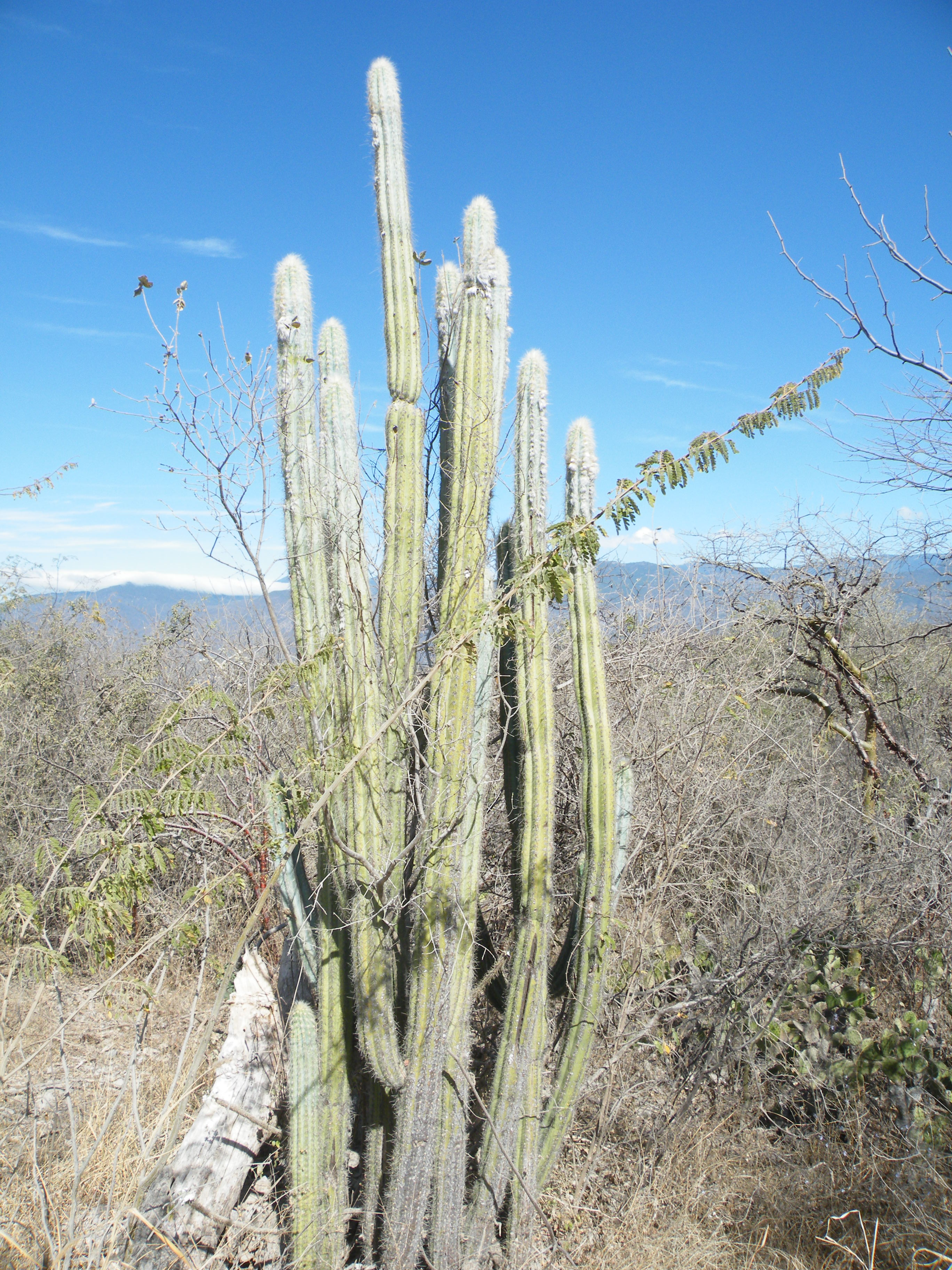
Pilosocereus quadricentralis

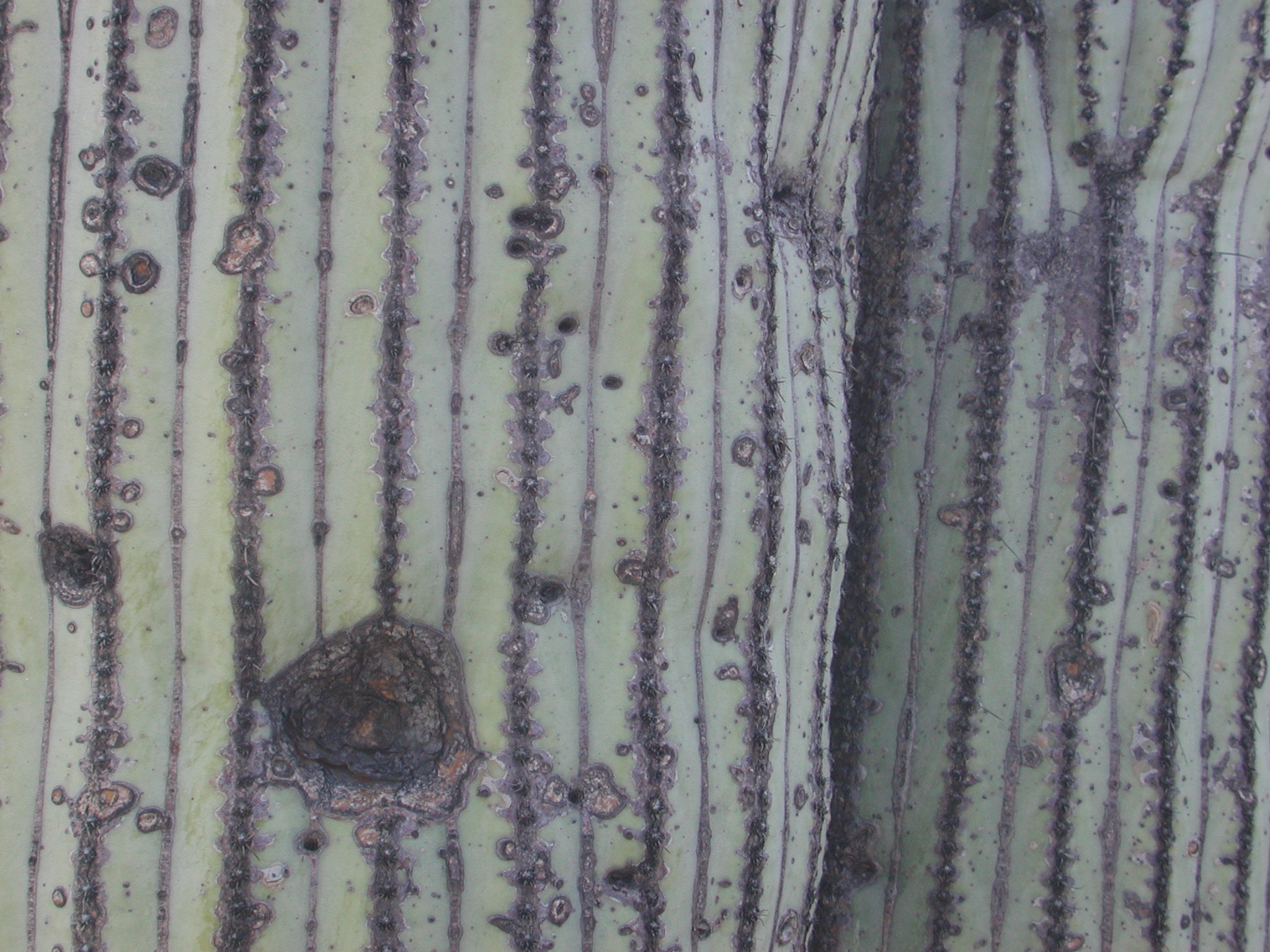
Cephalocereus columna-trajani

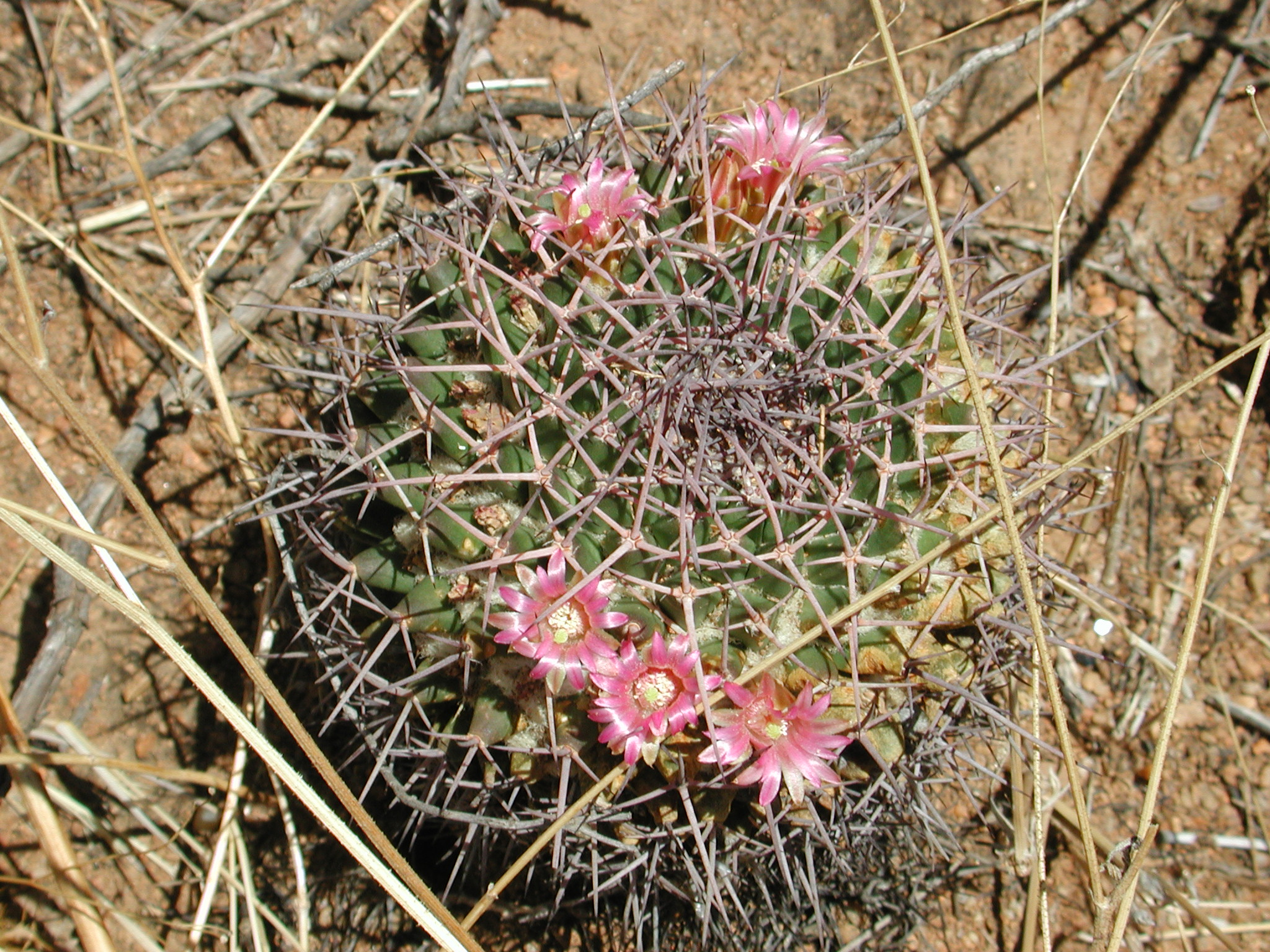
Mammillaria carnea

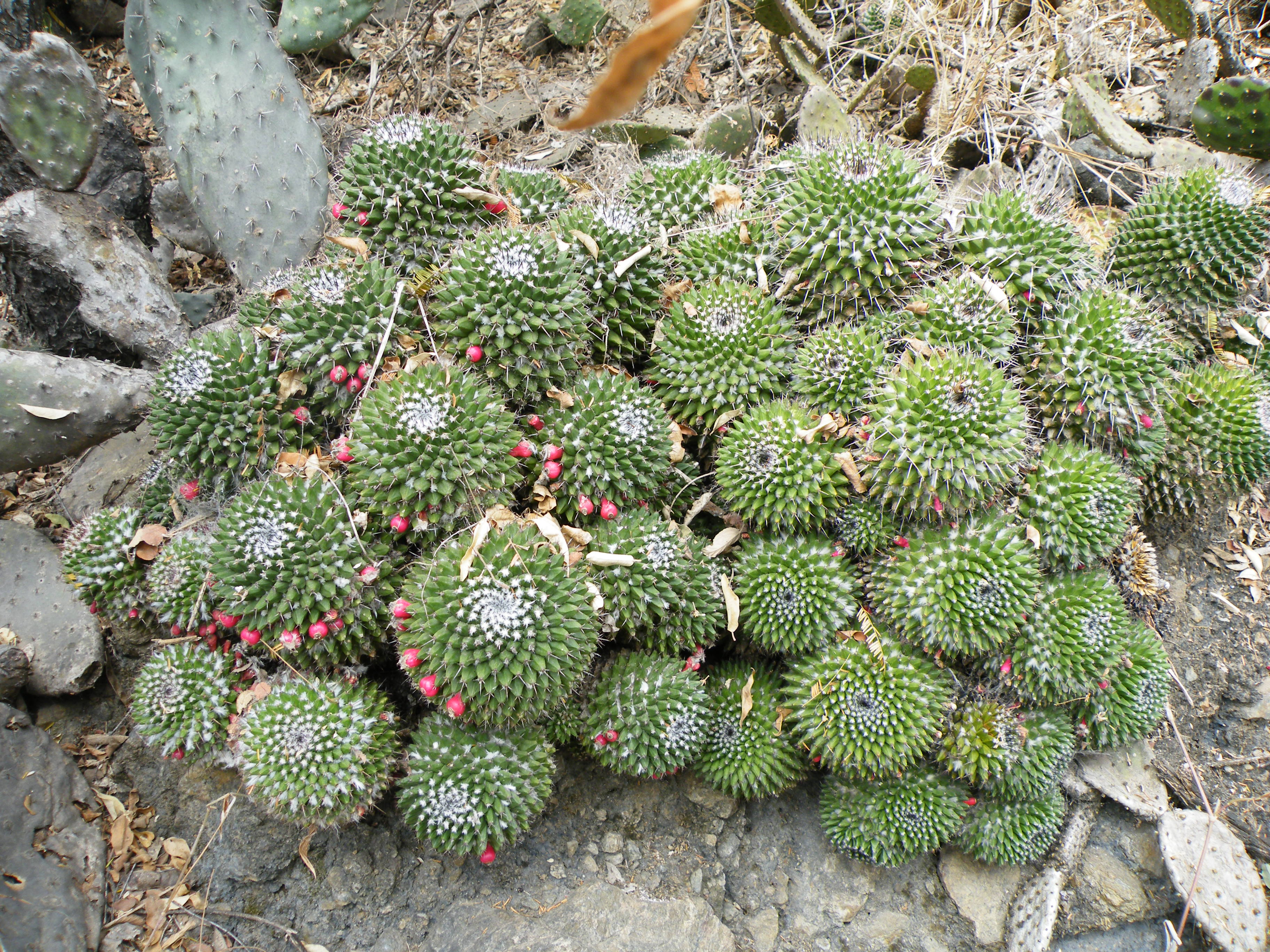
Mammillaria polyedra

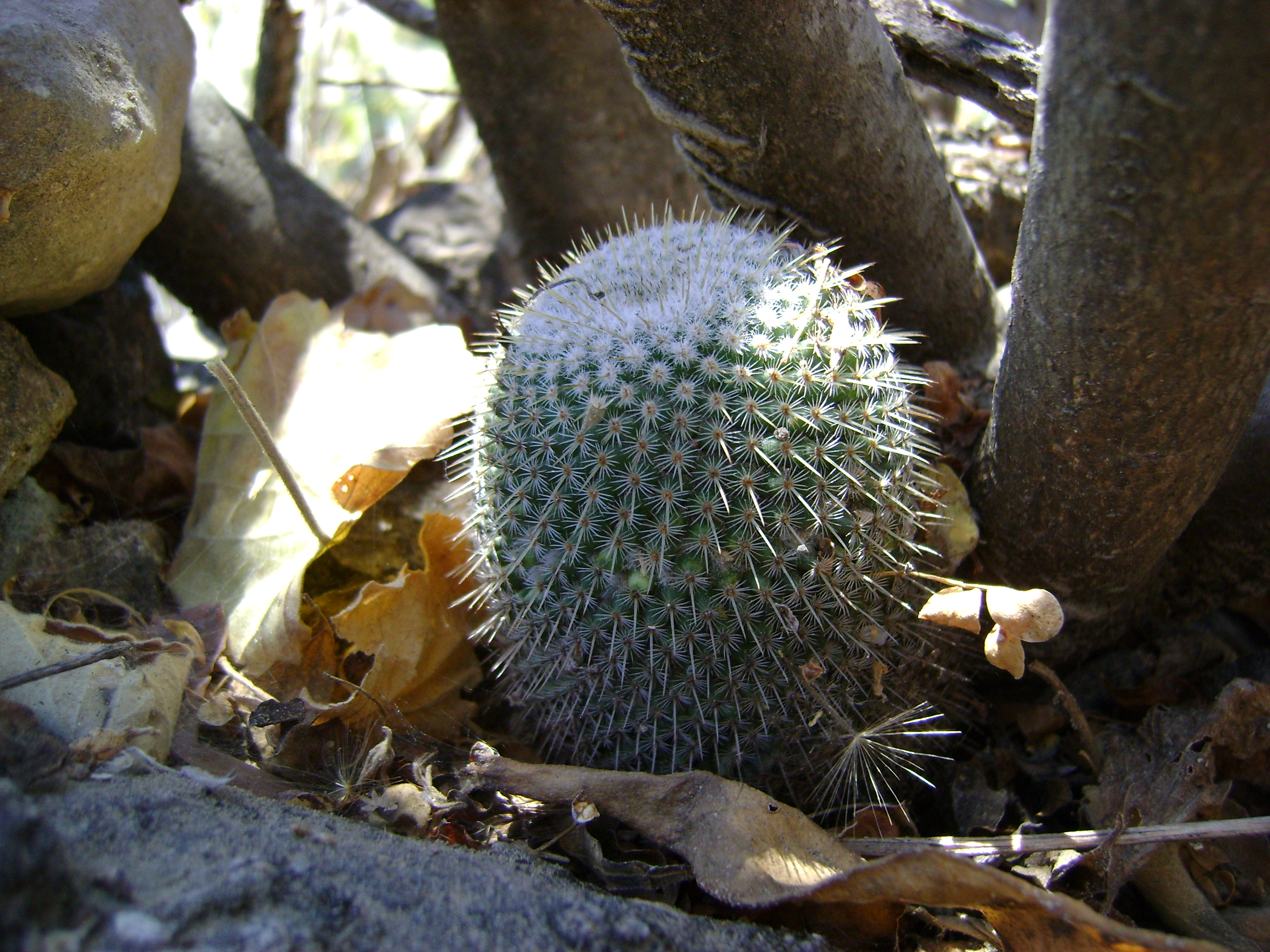
Mammillaria supertexta

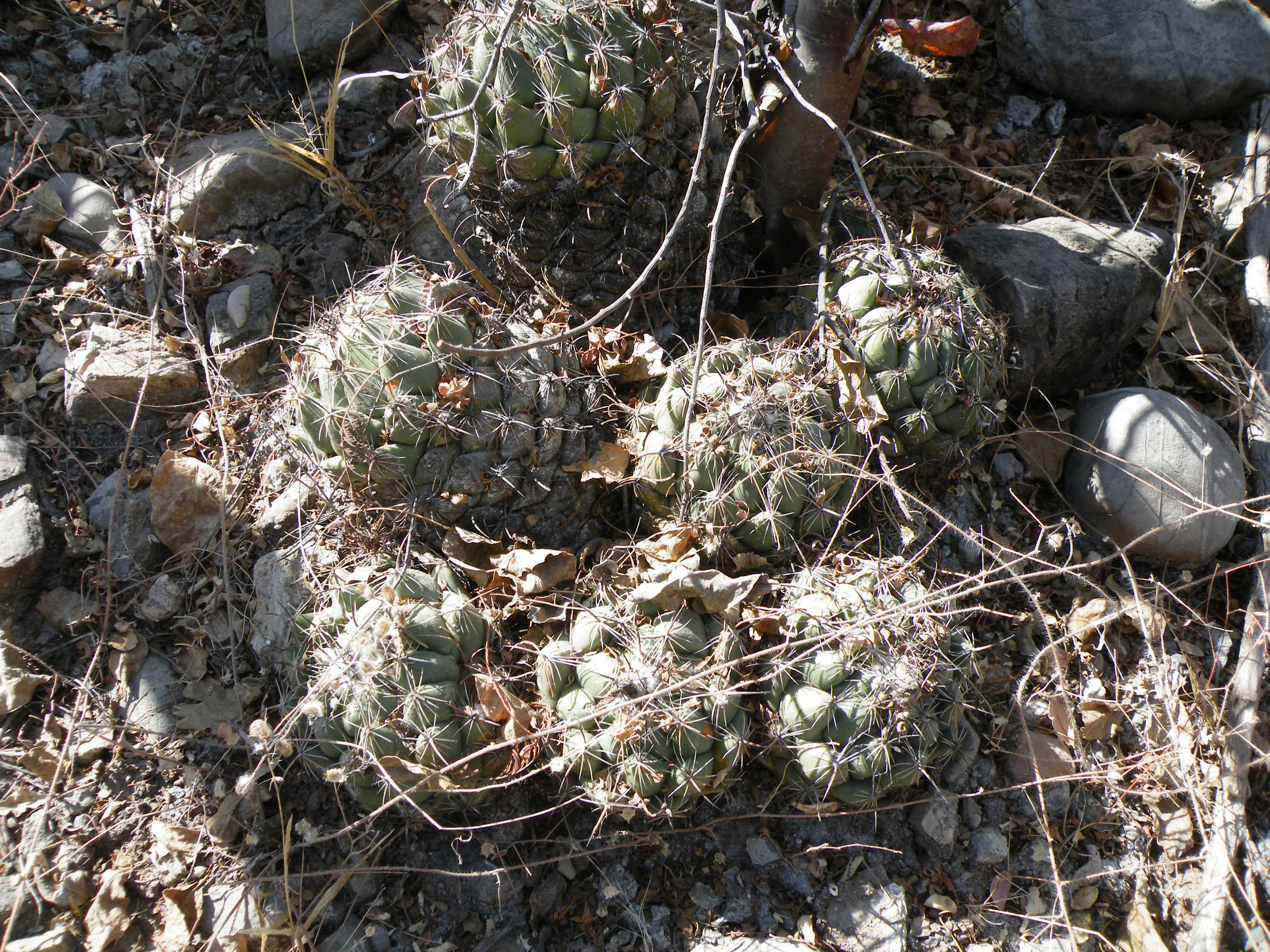
Coryphantha calipensis

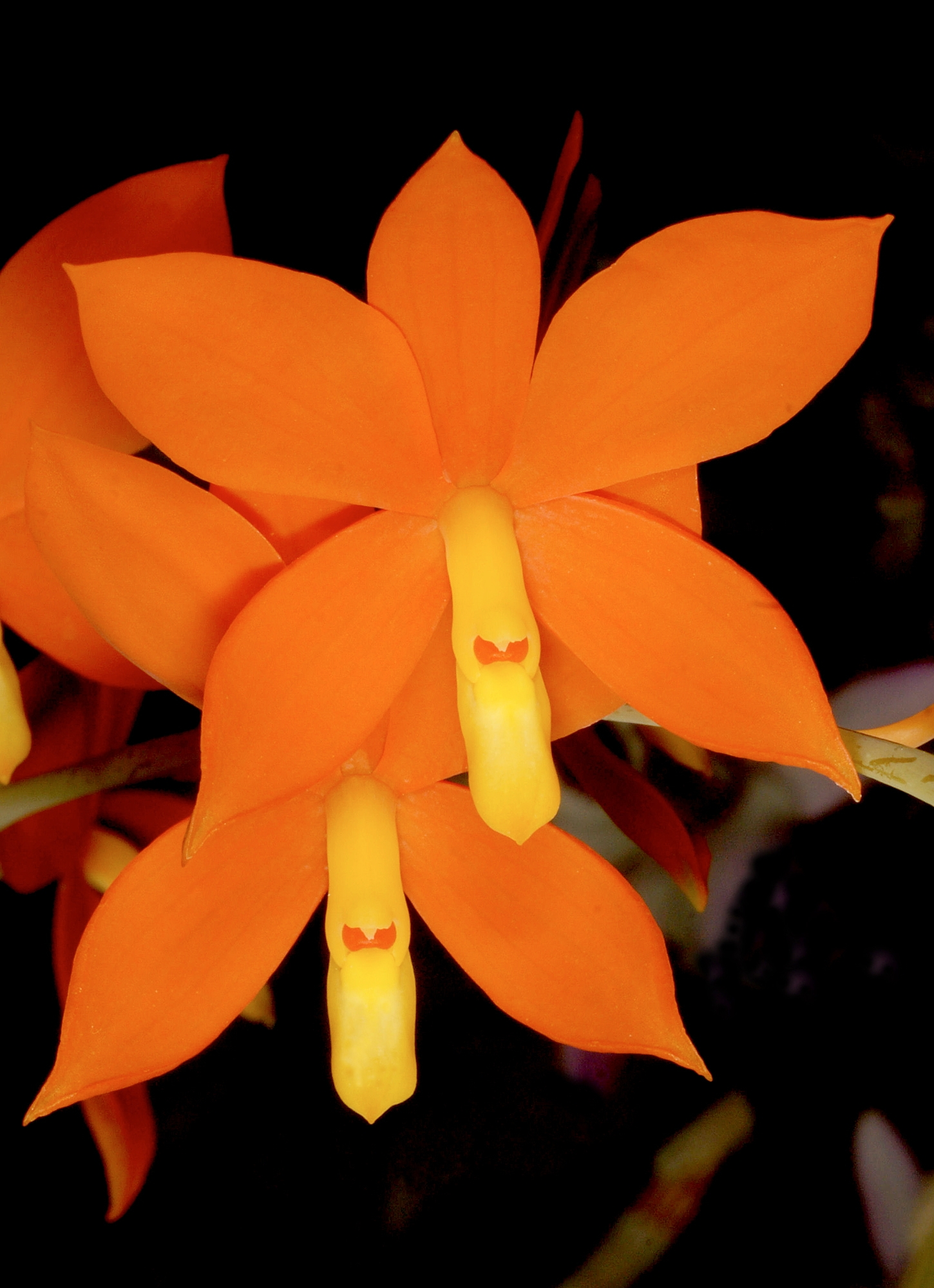
Prosthechea vitellina

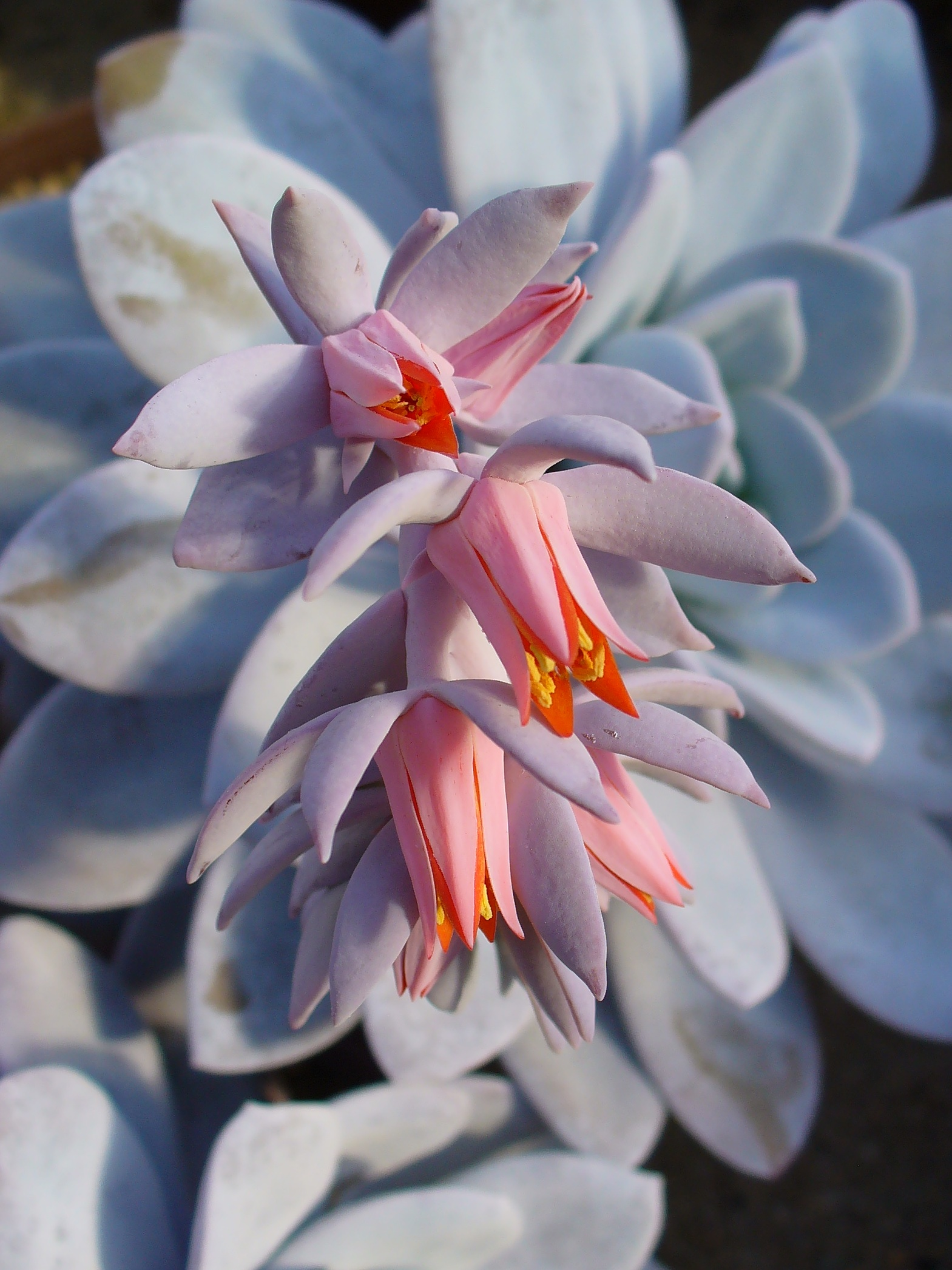
Echeveria laui
