= Salado River (Oaxaca) =

Location
- Country: Mexico
- States: Puebla and Oaxaca

Physical characteristics
- Mouth: Santo Domingo River
  - coordinates: 17°55′05″N 96°58′26″W

The Salado River is a river in the states of Puebla and Oaxaca in Mexico.

== Geography ==
The Salado and its tributaries drain the Tehuacán and Cuicatlán valleys. The Tehuacán-Cuicatlán valleys extends northwest-southeast through southeastern Puebla and northern Oaxaca. They are bounded on the east by the Sierra Madre de Oaxaca and on the west by the Sierra Mixteca. The Salado originates in Puebla, and flows southeastwards to join the Grande River, which flows northwestwards. The confluence of the Salado and Grande rivers forms the Santo Domingo River, which flows eastwards through the Sierra Madre de Oaxaca to join the Papaloapan River, which then empties into the Gulf of Mexico.

== Ecology ==
The Tehuacán and Cuicatlán valleys are in the arid rain shadow of the Sierra Madre de Oaxaca, and the climate of the valley floor is semi-arid to arid. The northern portion of the valley is mostly scrubland, part of the Tehuacán Valley matorral ecoregion. The southern portion of the valley is mostly dry forest, a southeastern outlier of the Balsas dry forests ecoregion. The mountain slopes are home to pine–oak forest, with the Sierra Madre de Oaxaca pine–oak forests to the east and the Sierra Madre del Sur pine–oak forests to the west.

The valleys are home to a great diversity of native plant species. Much of the area is part of the Tehuacán-Cuicatlán Biosphere Reserve.

== See also ==
- List of rivers of Mexico
