= Papaloapan Region =

Papaloapan
- Region
- Papaloapan region is in teal towards the north
- Coordinates: 18°06′0″N 96°07′0″W
- Country: Mexico
- State: Oaxaca
- Largest settlement: Tuxtepec

Area
  - Total: 8,678 km^{2} (3,351 sq mi)

Population (2020)
  - Total: 477,499

The Cuenca del Papaloapan Region is in the north of the southeastern Mexican state of Oaxaca, where the foothills of the Sierra Madre de Oaxaca meet the coastal plain of Veracruz. The principal city is San Juan Bautista Tuxtepec, the second largest in the state of Oaxaca.

== Geography ==
The region is bordered on the east by the Cañada region and on the south by the Sierra Norte region of Oaxaca. On the north it meets the state of Puebla and to the west the state of Veracruz. The region has an area of 8,678 km^{2} with two districts, Choapan and Tuxtepec. The climate is hot and humid all year, with average temperature 24 °C to 26 °C and average annual precipitation of 2,000mm to 4,500mm.

The Papaloapan region has diverse flora and lush vegetation, including amate, fig, locust, mahogany, oak, cedar, aloe, palm and ceiba hormiguillo. Fauna include porcupine, armadillo, jaguar, raccoon, gray fox, brocket deer and white-tailed deer. There is a great variety of birds. The region today suffers from serious pollution in the Papaloapan river and an alarming increase in erosion due to livestock.

== Population ==
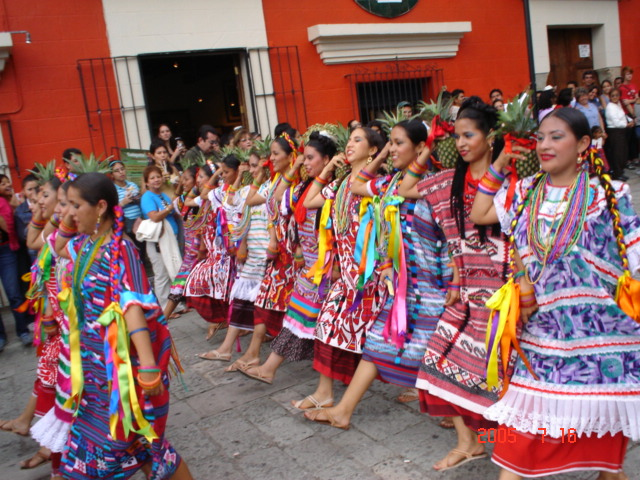
Flor de Piña: Oaxacan women on parade in traditional apparel.

As of the 2005 census, the region had a population of 429,681 inhabitants, or 49.51 inhabitants per square kilometer. The population includes Chinantecs, Mazatec, Mixtecs, Zapotecs and Mestizos, but the indigenous influence is not as visible in social and cultural life as in the other regions of Oaxaca. Given its location in the coastal plain, the region tends to identify itself more with the state of Veracruz than Oaxaca. Before 1958, the region was represented in the Lunes del Cerro festival by the Fandango Jarocho. Governor Alfonso Pérez Gasga then decided to replace the Fandango with a new dance that had a more typical Oaxacan nature, creating the "Flor de Piña" which would eventually represent the region.

== Economy ==
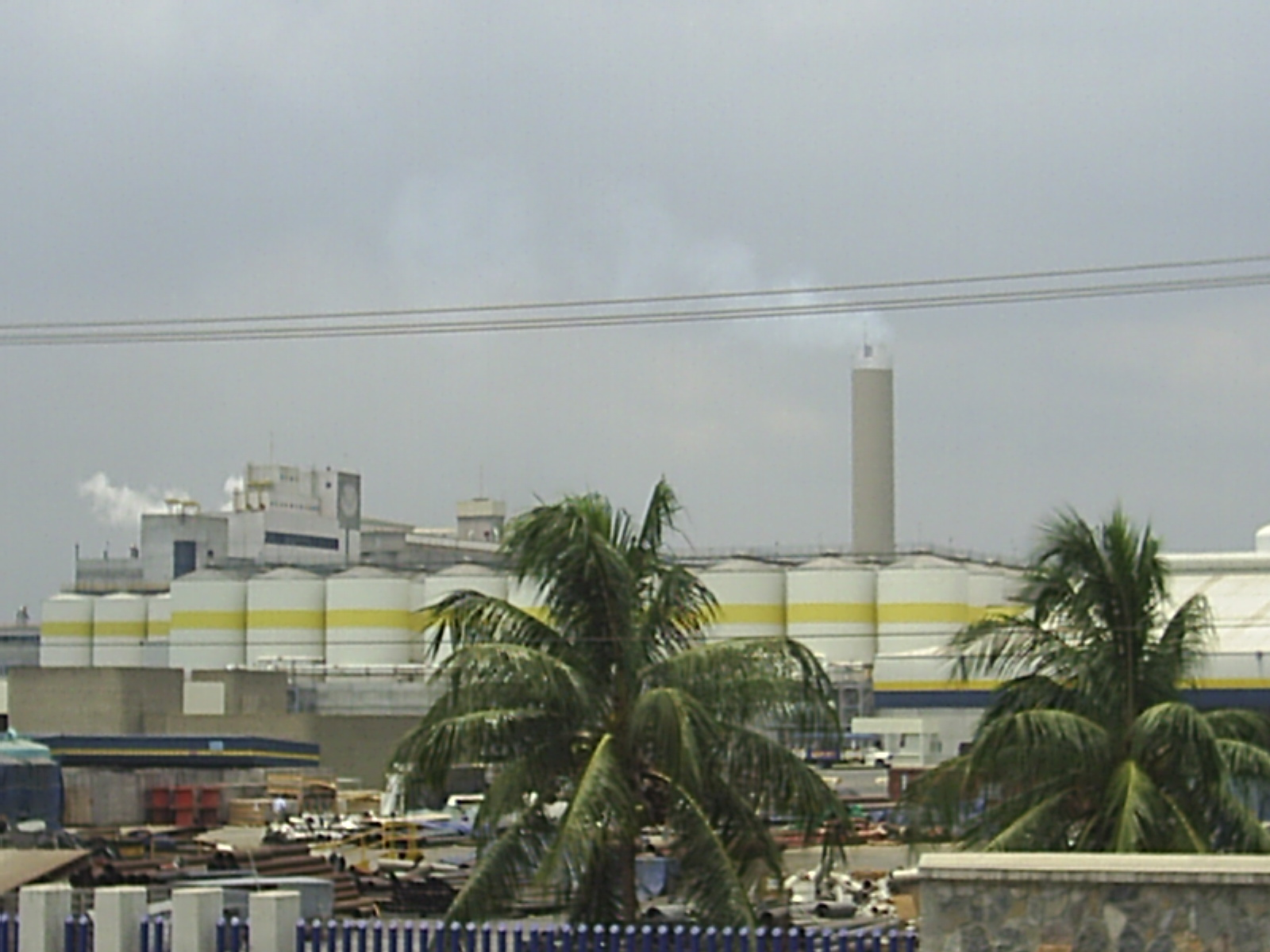
The region is the most industrialized in Oaxaca

The region is economically the most active and industrialized in the state. It contains the major Cerro de Oro and Miguel Alemán dams, which play a central role in flood prevention in the Papaloapan River basin in Veracruz, and are important sources of hydroelectric power. Industries include small-scale manufacture of fine wood furniture, sugar mills, chemical plants, refrigeration, fruit packers, paper mills, ethanol distillery and brewery. The region has deposits of oil, gold, uranium, coal and copper that have not yet been exploited.

With fertile, well-watered soil, pineapple is the primary crop, as well as rice, mango, litchi, banana, sugarcane, watermelon, green pepper, snuff, lemon, rubber, malanga and orange. There are large areas of grassland used for grazing cattle, thoroughbred horses, pigs and poultry. These are affecting soil fertility. Fisheries catch sunfish, tilapia, and red tenhuayaca in the springs, dams and rivers.

== History ==
The region first had contact with Spanish conquistadors who arrived seeking rivers of gold. The first major settlement was the town of Tuxtepec in the year 1811, and on March 15, 1825 it was declared a municipality. During the war of independence, it was the base of the Soyaltepec (Mazatecan) rebels, and there was similar resistance during the Empire of Maximilian.

In the late 1960s and early 1970s the federal government became interested in development of the economic potential of the Oaxacan region. Governor Víctor Bravo Ahuja, originally from Tuxtepec, gave a strong impetus for development and modernization of the area, promoting agricultural, commercial and industrial development.

== Tourist attractions ==
The region has many spas, with most attractions in the tributaries of the Valle Nacional River such as Zuzul, Los Cocos, Piedra Quemada and Los Sauces. This area has an exquisite tropical climate with clear waters and lush forests inhabited by exotic birds such as toucans, macaws, parrots and pelicans. Ecotourism is the most important tourist activity, the region having numerous streams, caves, swamps and lagoons of sulphurous waters, providing opportunities for forest mountain hiking, horseback riding through the jungle and cave exploration.
