= Temascal, Oaxaca =

Temascal Naxhingee
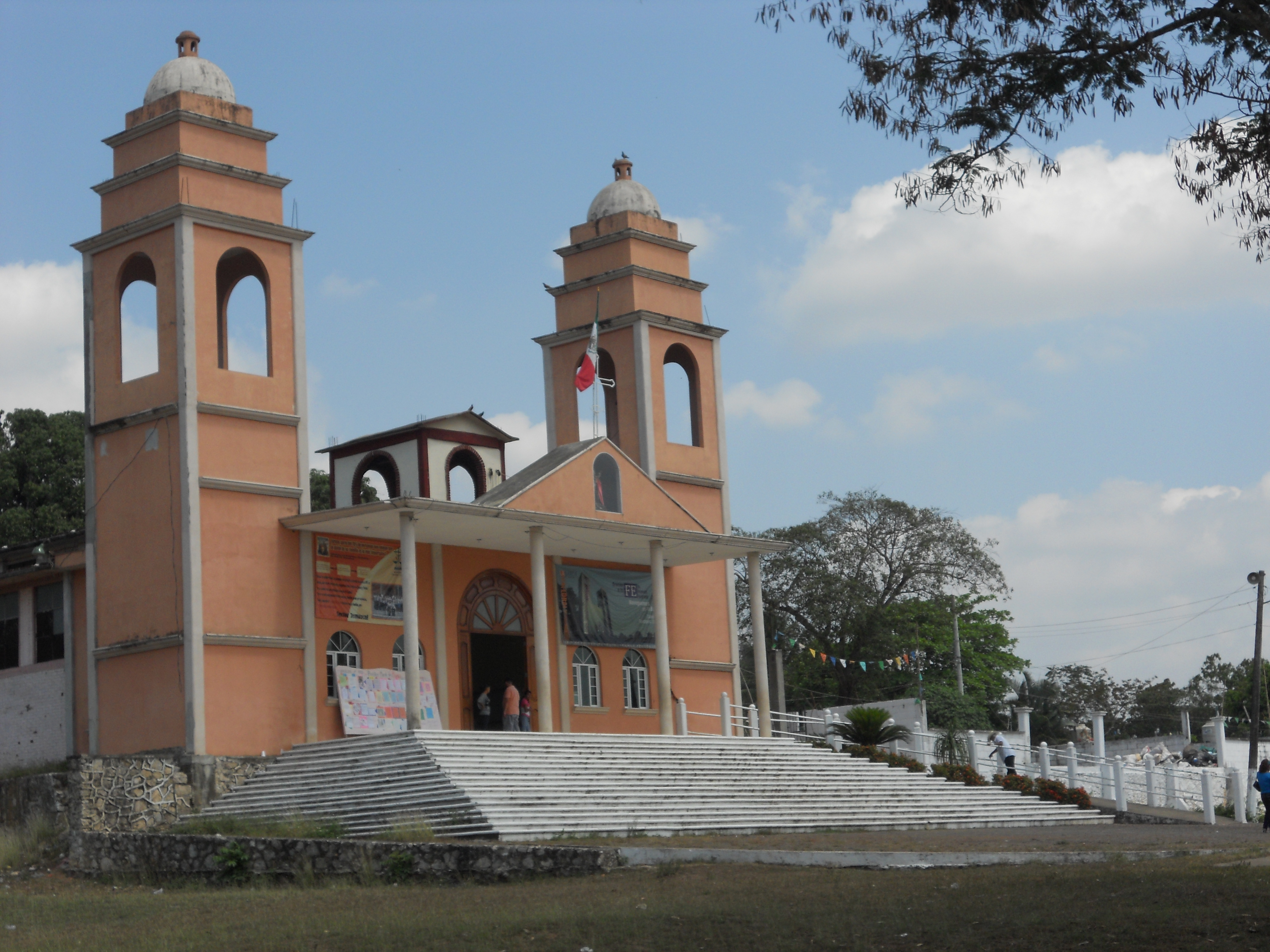
- Church in Temascal

- Location within Mexico
- Coordinates: 18°14′22″N 96°24′11″W
- Country: Mexico
- State: Oaxaca
- Municipality: San Miguel Soyaltepec
- Elevation: 35 m (115 ft)

Population (2010)
  - Total: 6,566
- Time zone: UTC-6 (Central (US Central))

Temascal is a town in the Mexican state of Oaxaca which is the seat of the municipality of San Miguel Soyaltepec. It is part of the Tuxtepec District of the Papaloapan Region. The name Soyaltepec means "hill of palm trees" in Náhuatl but the area also has the Mazatec name of Naxhingee, which means "ragged hill".

== History ==
The original town of San Miguel Soyaltepec was founded in 1500. The area saw a battle on 25 April 1865 where invading French forces were defeated by Colonel Luis Pérez Figueroa. For this reason, the name of the town was changed to Patriótica Villa de San Miguel Soyaltepec in 1868.

The Presidente Miguel Alemán dam was completed in 1954, flooding the original town of San Miguel Soyaltepec and forcing the relocation of about 22,000 Mazatecs.

== Geography ==
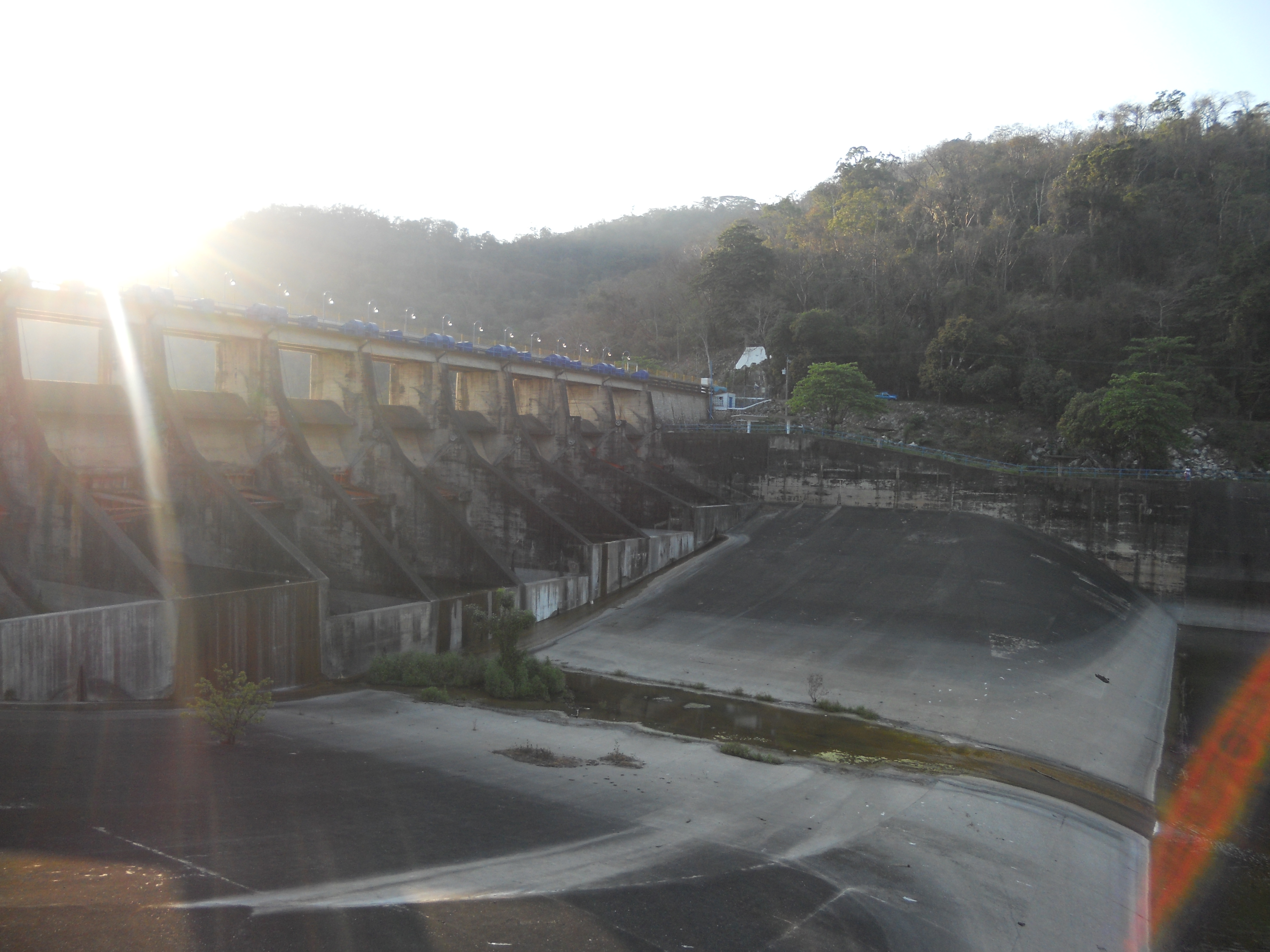
Intake from the turbine discharge of the Temascal hydroelectric plant

The dam controls the lower Río Papaloapan which historically has had devastating floods, and generates 725 million kilowatts of electrical power. The dam's artificial lake lends itself to various water sports such as fishing (catfish, mojarra and carp) as well as boat tours to the islands of San Miguel Soyaltepec and Isabel María. The lakesides abound with a wide variety of water birds, small mammals and reptiles.

=== Jurisdiction ===
As the municipal seat, Temascal has governing jurisdiction over the following communities:

Agua Escondida (Isla Agua Escondida), Arroyo Caracol, Arroyo Chical (Nuevo Arroyo Chicali), Arroyo de Enmedio (La Guadalupe), Arroyo Macín, Arroyo Tigre, Benito Juárez II (San Martín), Cabeza de Tigre, Cerro de Agua Platanar, Cerro Tepexcuintle, Cerro Verde, Colonia Cosoltepec, Colonia Ingeniero Raúl Sandoval Landázuri, Corral de Piedra, Corriente Ancha o Miguel Hidalgo, Cosolapa Caracol, El Capulín (La Nueva Pochota), El Carmen, El Dique, Emiliano Zapata, Isla de Málzaga, Isla del Viejo, Soyaltepec (Isla Soyaltepec), Isla la Patria Vieja, Islas Santa Julia, La Candelaria, La Luz, La Parcela (Armando Vásquez), La Reforma, La Reforma (La Reformita), Las Margaritas, Las Pilas, Loma Bonita, Los Nanches, Nueva Calería, Nueva Patria, Nuevo Buenavista, Nuevo Paso Nazareno (Chichicazapa), Nuevo Pescadito de Abajo, Nuevo Pescadito de Abajo Dos, Nuevo Pescadito de Enmedio, Nuevo Pescadito de Málzaga (La Breña), Pescadito de Arriba, Piedra de Amolar, Playa de Jícama, Playa Lecuona (Miguel Hidalgo), Rancho Norteño, Rancho Nuevo, Rancho Orozco, Rancho Valdez, Regino Malpica Vicente, Rincón Bonito, San Antonio Abad (Cerro Chango), San Antonio Cosolapa, and San Marcos.
