= Sceloporus cryptus =

Conservation status
- Least Concern (IUCN 3.1)

Scientific classification
- Domain: Eukaryota
- Kingdom: Animalia
- Phylum: Chordata
- Class: Reptilia
- Order: Squamata
- Suborder: Iguania
- Family: Phrynosomatidae
- Genus: Sceloporus
- Species: S. cryptus

Binomial name
- Sceloporus cryptus H.M. Smith & Lynch, 1967

Species of lizard

Sceloporus cryptus, the Sierra Juarez spiny lizard, is a species of lizard in the family Phrynosomatidae. It is endemic to Mexico, where it inhabits drier portions of the Sierra Juárez of northeastern Oaxaca, between 1,800 and 2,500 meters elevation.
