= Sierra Juárez =

Sierra Juárez may refer to:

- Sierra de Juárez, Baja California Peninsula, Mexico
- Sierra Juárez, Oaxaca, Mexico
