= Cerro de Oro Dam =

- Interactive map of Cerro de Oro Dam
- Location: Oaxaca, Mexico
- Coordinates: 17°59′55″N 96°15′47″W
- Opening date: May 1989

Dam and spillways
- Impounds: Santo Domingo River
- Height: 75.6 m (248 ft)

Reservoir
- Creates: Cerro de Oro Lake
- Total capacity: 13.380 million m^{3} (with Miguel Alemán Dam)
- Surface area: 22,000 hectares

The Cerro de Oro Dam (English: Gold Hill Dam), also called the Miguel de la Madrid Hurtado Dam, is on the Santo Domingo River in the San Juan Bautista Tuxtepec municipality of the Papaloapan Region of Oaxaca state in southern Mexico. The dam operates in conjunction with the Miguel Alemán Dam, located on the Tonto River to control floods in the Papaloapan basin in Veracruz state. Construction began in 1973 and the dam was completed in May 1989. About 26,000 people were displaced by the project. Water quality in the reservoir is poor and deteriorating, affecting fish catches.

== Purpose ==
The Santo Domingo joins the Valle Nacional River below the dam to form the Papaloapan river, which is joined by the Tonto river to the north of the city of San Juan Bautista Tuxtepec and meanders northeastward through the Veracruz coastal plain to the Gulf of Mexico. The Papaloapan river basin was subject to frequent flooding, with the damage sometimes compounded by cyclones. A particularly severe flood in September 1944 covered 470,000 hectares, with great loss of life and property. The Miguel Aleman dam reduced the problem, but further floods occurred after it had been completed in 1955. A flood in 1958 covered 195,000 hectares and one in 1969 covered 340,000 hectares. Meanwhile, the drainage capacity of the Papaloapan river was being reduced by silt carried by the Santo Domingo river. The Papaloapan river Commission recommended building the Cerro de Oro dam on the Santo Domingo river, which would reduce the extent of floods to a manageable level. The combined reservoir of the two dams would also support increased power generation from the Miguel Alemán dam.

== Structure ==
The dam curtain is a massive structure of packed earth and gravel. The reservoir covers 22,000 hectares, joined by a channel to the 47,800 hectare reservoir formed by the Miguel Alemán, giving a combined capacity of 13,380 million m^{3}. There are plans to add hydroelectric generation capacity to the dam, delivering about 10.8 megawatts.

== Displaced population ==
Approximately 26,000 local people were forced to move. The original plan had been to move the people to the area immediately below the dam, but this was frustrated by large landowners in the target region. The move, mostly of Chinantec people, took place in two stages, ending up in 30 new villages in the Uxpanapa region of south-central Veracruz. The government bulldozed and burned large areas of the northern Selva Zoque forest to allow for farming in the new settlements, with mixed results. The displaced people later complained that the government had not met its promises in the amount of land allocated. The government denied making such promises, and stated that the people had not owned the flooded land since time immemorial and therefore were not entitled to compensation, although land had been provided.

== Environmental issues ==
The reservoir waters have been changing from oligotrophic to eutrophic due to increased release of nutrients from submerged organic matter, combined with thermal stratification, making them less hospitable to many fish species. Land clearance around the reservoirs has caused increasing silting, and human activities have caused pollution from sewage, trash, fertilizers and pesticides. The dams have also affected populations of some species of fish and crustaceans in the tributary rivers by disrupting their migration patterns.
