= Cajones River =

River in Oaxaca, Mexico

Coordinates: 17°45′0″N 95°55′0″W

The Cajones River, in the municipality of Ayotzintepec, divides the Sierra Juárez from the Sierra de Villa Alta in the Mexican state of Oaxaca. It joins the Manso River to form the Tesechoacan River, a tributary of the Papaloapan River.
