= Miguel Alemán Dam =

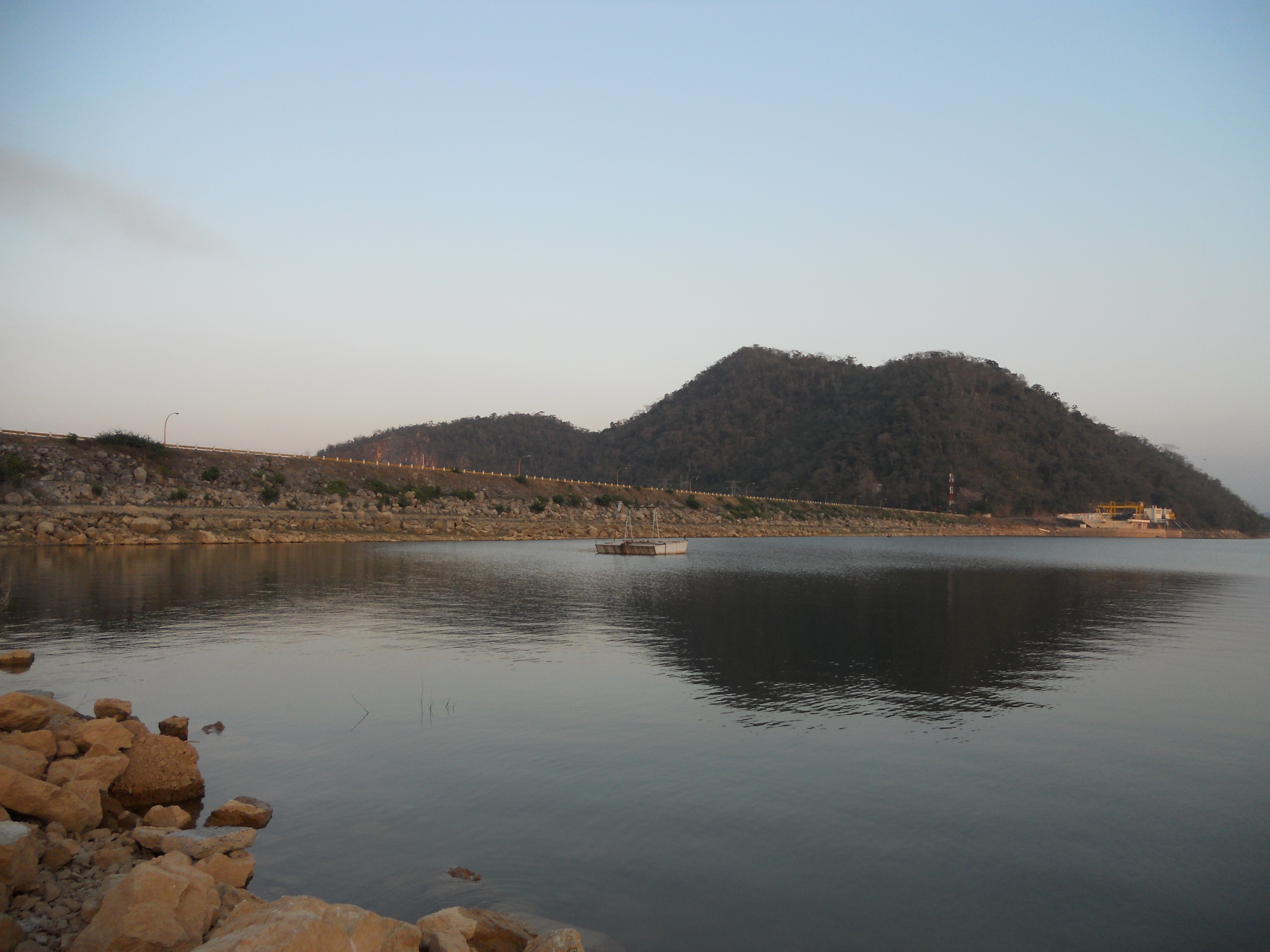
- Interactive map of Miguel Alemán Dam
- Location: Oaxaca, Mexico
- Coordinates: 18°13′59″N 96°24′45″W
- Opening date: 1954

Dam and spillways
- Impounds: Tonto River

Reservoir
- Creates: Miguel Alemán Lake
- Total capacity: 13,380 MCM (with Cerro de Oro Dam)
- Surface area: 47,800 hectares

The Miguel Alemán Dam is on the Tonto River in the Papaloapan Region of Oaxaca state in southern Mexico, just upstream from the town of Temascal, Oaxaca, forming the Miguel Alemán Lake with an area of 47,800 hectares. The dam operates in conjunction with the Cerro de Oro Dam, located on the Santo Domingo River to control floods in the Papaloapan basin in Veracruz state. Together with the 22,000 hectare reservoir of the Cerro de Oro, which is joined by a channel to the Miguel Alemán Lake, the combined capacity is 13,380 million cubic metres. The lake formed by the dam is scenic, providing income from fishing and tourism. The northwestern shore and islands have been declared a nature reserve. The dam includes the Temascal hydroelectric plant.

== Purpose ==
The Santo Domingo and the Tonto rivers join to the south of the city of San Juan Bautista Tuxtepec to form the Papaloapan river, which meanders northeastward to the Gulf of Mexico. The basin of this river in the coastal plain was subject to frequent flooding, with the damage sometimes compounded by cyclones. A particularly severe flood in September 1944 covered 470,000 hectares, with great loss of life and property. The Miguel Aleman dam reduced the problem, although floods continued and the Cerro de Oro Dam on the Santo Domingo was required to fully control the floods.

== Construction and capacity ==
The dam was initiated by the government of President Miguel Alemán Valdés in 1947 and construction started in 1949. The dam was named for the president's father, Miguel Alemán González. The dam created a 2,300,000-acre (9,300 km^{2}) reservoir, provided a large portion of the region's growing electricity demand and provided an assured irrigation supply for thousands of new fruit, dairy, and vegetable farms. However, the project required relocation of thousands of poor Mazatec, Chinantec and Mixe families. There been a re-evaluation of the project's impact on the environment.

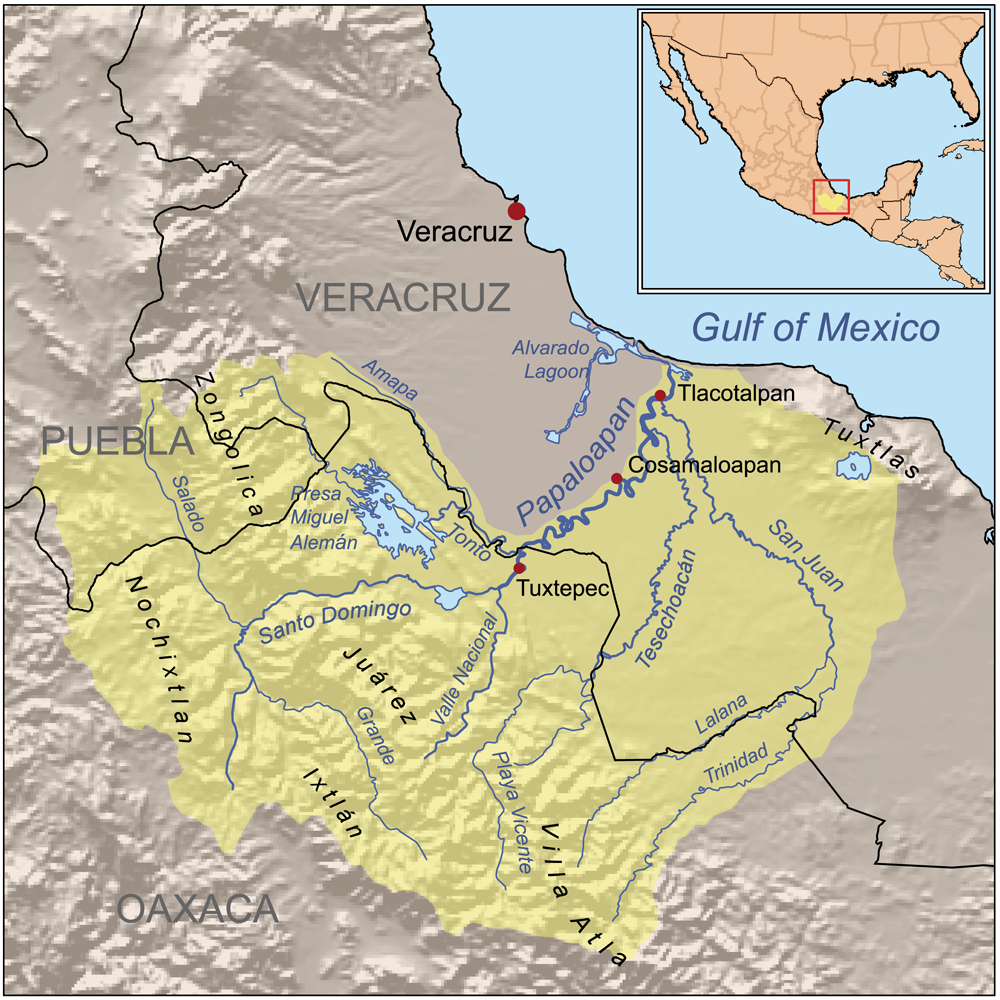
Map of the Papaloapan River drainage basin before construction of the Cerro de Oro Dam, showing the Miguel Alemán Lake (center)

The dam has a capacity of 8 million m^{3} (2,113,400,000 US gallons), from which 6.77 million m^{3} (1,788,500,000 US gallons) is available for power generation. The dam has a length of 830 meters (2,720 feet). The Temascal hydroelectric plant located east of the dam generates about 725 million kilowatts a year.
