= Santo Domingo River (Oaxaca) =

River in Oaxaca, Mexico

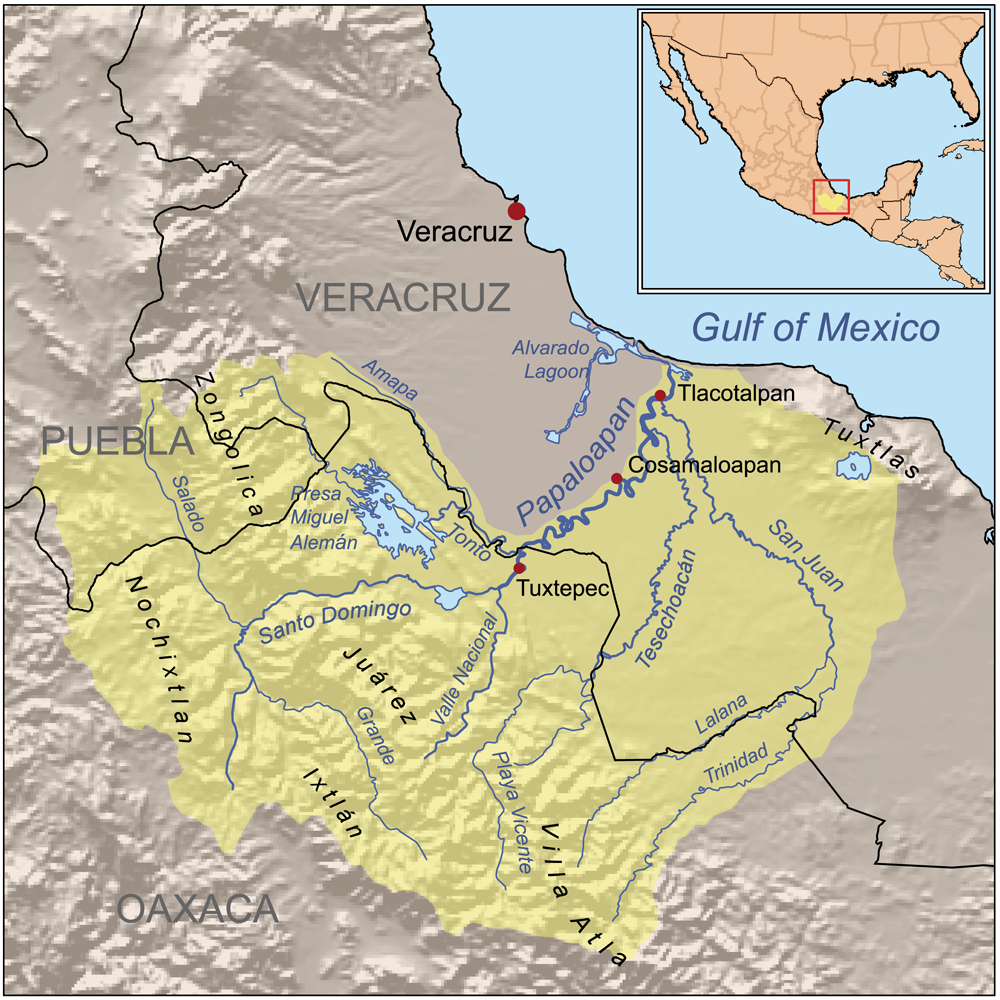
- Map of the Papaloapan River drainage basin before construction of the Cerro de Oro Dam, showing the Santo Domingo River (center)

Location
- Country: Mexico

Physical characteristics
- Source
  - location: Northeast Oaxaca, in Tuxtepec

The Santo Domingo River, in the Mexican state of Oaxaca, is one of the main tributaries of the Papaloapan River. It is formed by the confluence of the Salado and Grande rivers, which drain the dry Tehuacán and Cuicatlán valleys west of the Sierra Madre de Oaxaca. The Santo Domingo river flows east through the Sierra Madre, dividing the Sierra Zongolica sub-range to the north from the Sierra Juárez to the south. It joins with the Valle Nacional River above San Juan Bautista Tuxtepec to form the Papaloapan.

Carrying sediment from the mountains, it was a major cause of flooding in the coastal plain of Veracruz by reducing the capacity of the Papaloapan to drain the plains. To alleviate these problems, the Cerro de Oro Dam was constructed on the river just above the junction with the Valle Nacional, completed in 1989. The reservoir behind the dam is connected by a channel to Lake Miguel Alemán, the reservoir formed by the Miguel Alemán Dam on the Tonto River.
