= Sierra Juárez, Oaxaca =

Range of mountains in Oaxaca state, Mexico

Sierra Juárez
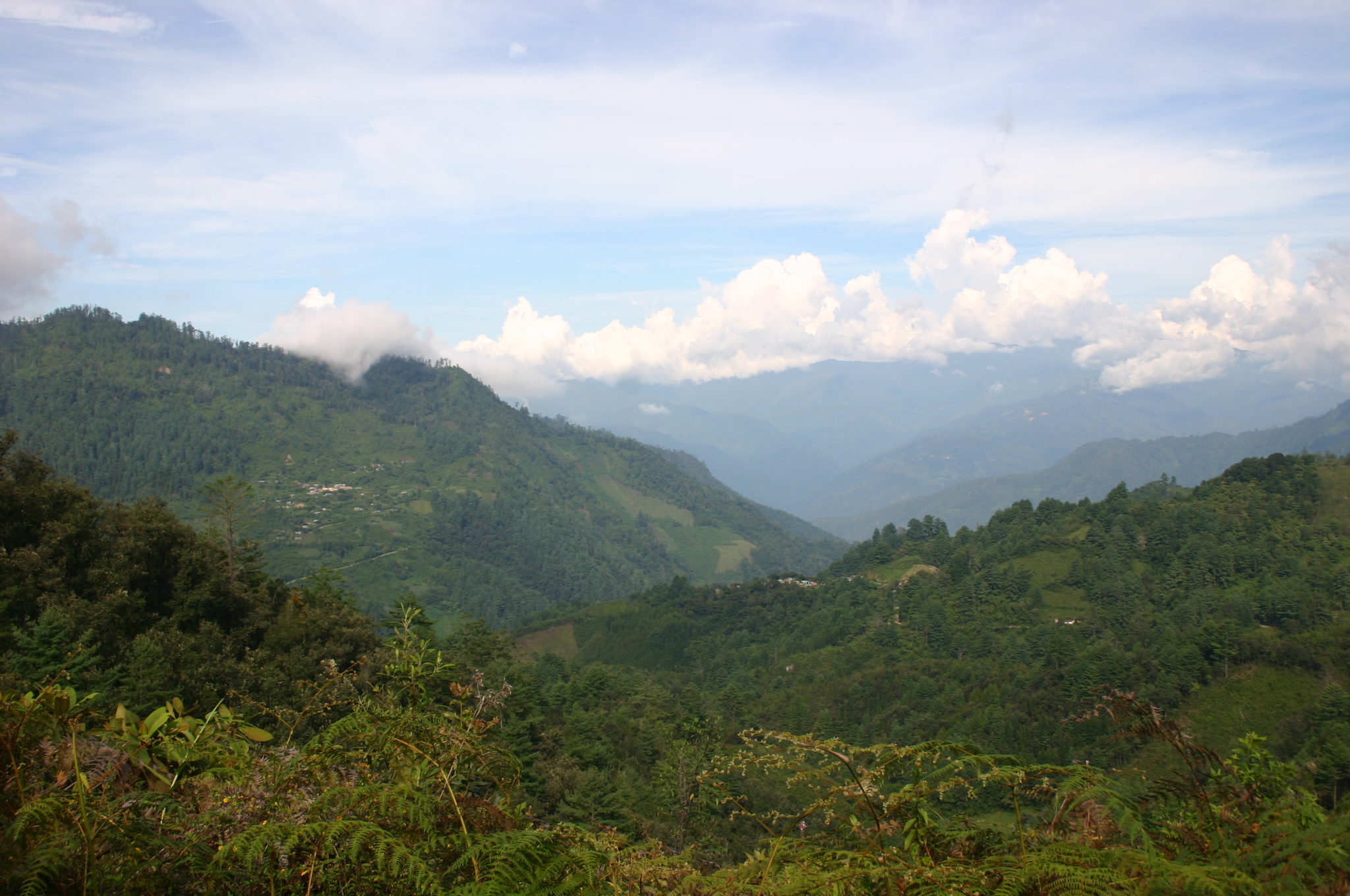
- Sierra Juarez, view from San Juan Yagila in the Rincón de Ixtlan Region, Oaxaca, Mexico

Highest point
- Elevation: 3,250 m (10,660 ft)

Geography
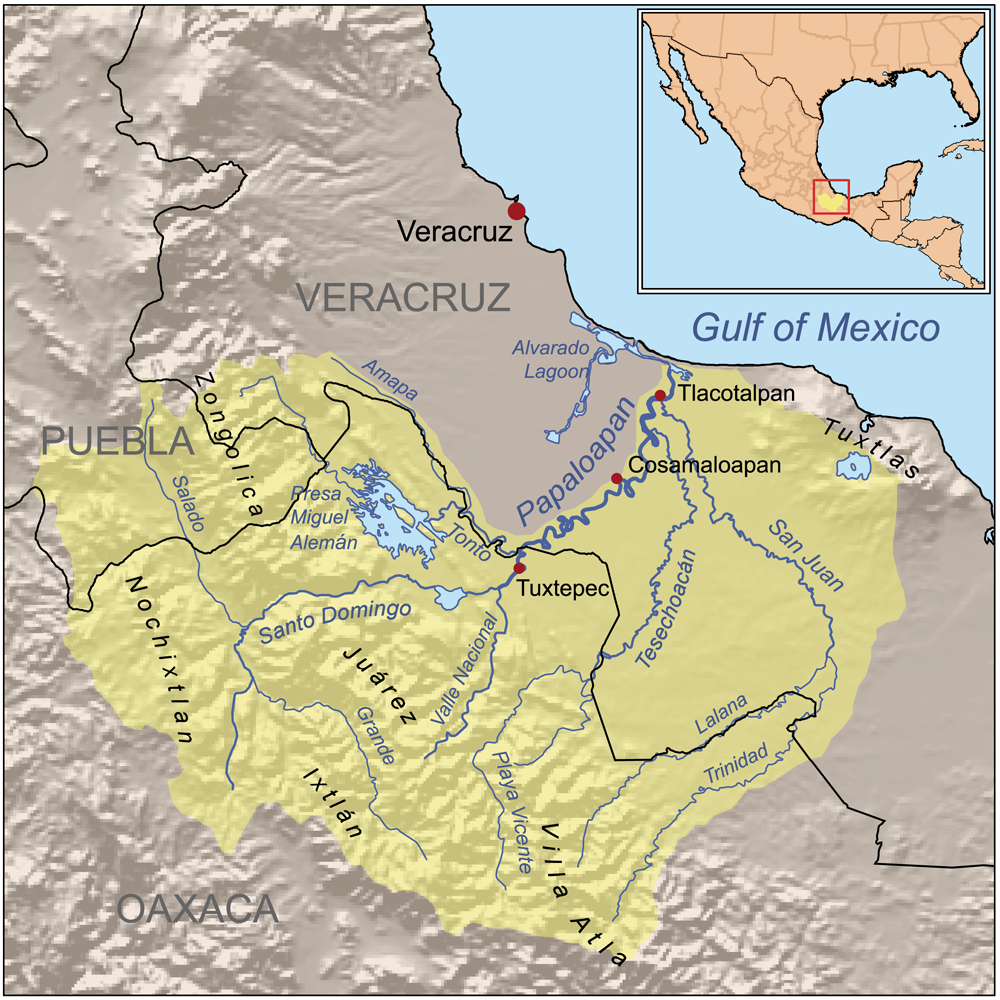
- Papaloapan River drainage basin showing Sierra Juarez in the Sierra Madre de Oaxaca
- Country: Mexico
- Region: Oaxaca
- Range coordinates: 17°35′N 96°40′W
- Parent range: Sierra Madre de Oaxaca

The Sierra Juárez is a range of mountains in Oaxaca state, Mexico between latitudes 17°20'-17°50'N and longitudes 96°15'-97°00'W, with an area of about 1,700 km^{2} (660 sq mi). It is part of the Sierra Madre de Oaxaca. The range is separated from the Sierra de Zongólica to the north by the Santo Domingo River, flowing through the Tecomavaca Canyon. It stretches south-eastward to the Cajones River and the Sierra de Villa Alta. The mountains are in the district of Ixtlán de Juárez in the Sierra Norte de Oaxaca region. The range is named after Mexico's only indigenous president, Benito Juárez, who was born here in 1806 in the small village of San Pablo Guelatao. The heavily wooded area is about 62 km (39 mi) from the city of Oaxaca on Federal highway 175, heading towards Tuxtepec.

== Terrain and climate ==
The mountains climb from 500 to 3,250 m (1,640 to 10,660 ft), with many large and deep ravines. They are formed of folded sedimentary rocks with series of younger granitic intrusions that date from the Palaeozoic to Cenozoic, with the majority being Mesozoic. The climate is subtropical in the lower regions and temperate and subhumid above 1,000 m (3,300 ft), with average temperature from 16 to 20 °C (61 to 68 °F). There is regular frost in the higher mountains. Annual rainfall, fed by the trade winds from the Caribbean Sea, ranges from 700 to 4,000 mm (28 to 157 in) or more. The Valle Nacional River originates in the Sierra de Juárez, one of the major tributaries of the Papaloapan River.

== Vegetation ==
The Sierra Juárez is one of Oaxaca State's wettest areas and richest in forest diversity, with perhaps 2,000 of the 8,000 or more plant species that are found in the state. It is mostly covered by montane cloud forest, but includes tropical evergreen forests and forests of pine, pine-oak and oak. The cloud forest forms a band from 1,000–1,400 m (3,300–4,600 ft) in height, up to 2,250 m (7,380 ft) along the northern and eastern slopes. The climate is cool, 14–20 °C (57–68 °F), and has mean annual rainfall that exceeds 2,000 mm (79 in) and is sometimes much higher. The dominant trees are 20–30 m (66–98 ft) tall and include evergreen and deciduous species, palms, tree ferns, heather shrubs, vines, and moisture-loving herbs.

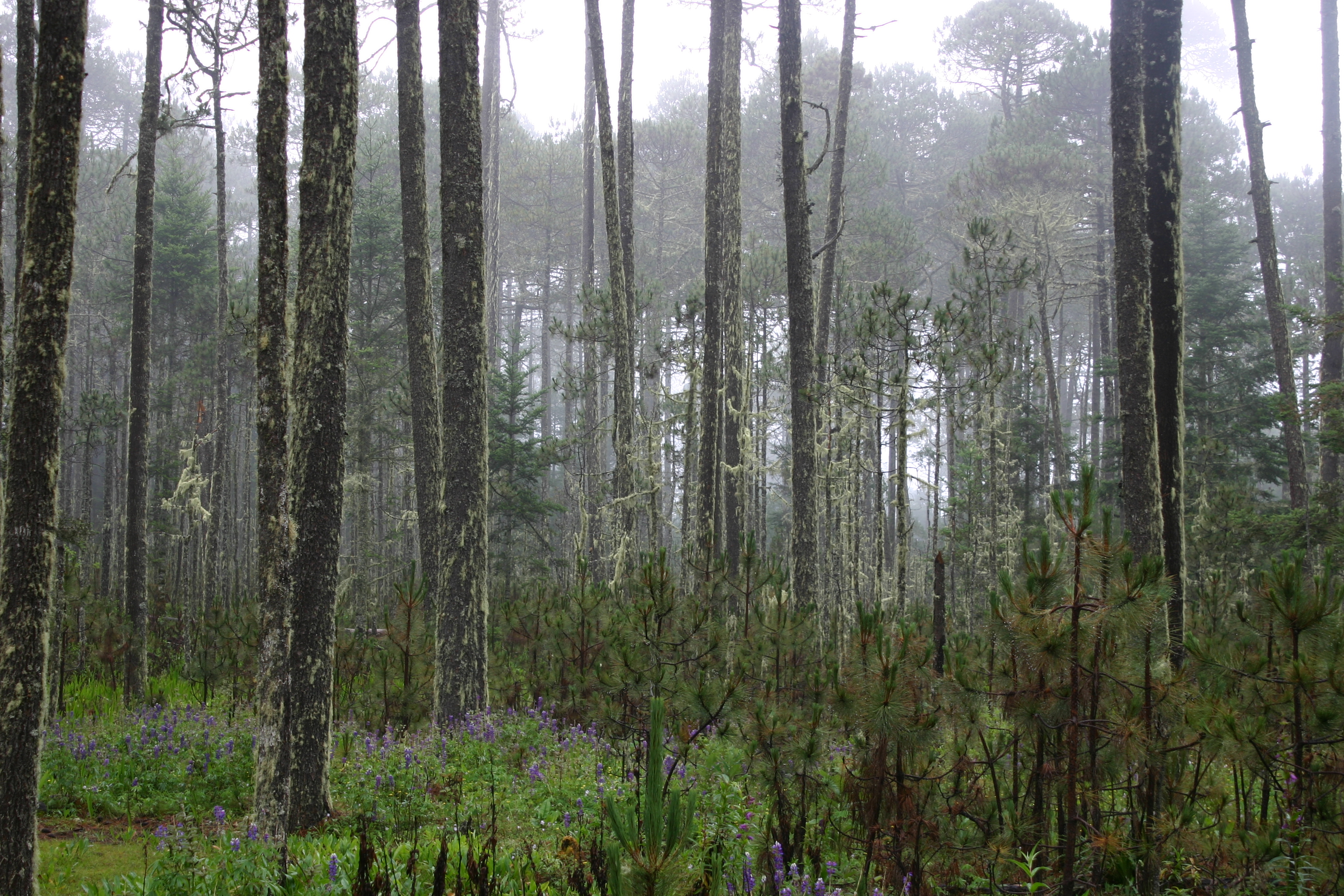
Temperate Pine Forest on the road between San Isidro and San Miguel Llano Grande Cajonos, Sierra Juárez, Oaxaca, Mexico

The tropical evergreen forest is dominated by evergreen trees 30–40 m (98–131 ft) tall, with abundant lianas and tropical epiphytes. Pine and pine-oak forests, at a height from 1,600–2,800 m (5,200–9,200 ft) have evergreen trees 25–40 m (82–131 ft) tall, with grasses dominating the lower stratum. Oak forests at a height from 2,000–2,500 m (6,600–8,200 ft) grow in areas with relatively lower rainfall that have a dry season in summer. The oak forests are found in the western, inland part of the sierra to the Rio Grande Basin.

== Animals ==
A species of alligator lizard, Abronia juarezi, is endemic to and named after the Sierra Juárez mountain range.

== People ==
The Sierra Juárez is the land of the Sierra Zapotecs, of whom President Benito Juárez was one of the most famous. The Zapotecs of the Sierra Norte, who call themselves the bene xon, are one of three major Zapotec regions in southern Mexico. The other three reside in the Isthmus of Tehuantepec, the Valles Centrales region and the Sierra Madre Oriental. The bene xon divide into four sub-cultures: Cajonos, El Rincón, Ixtlán and Choapan. Other indigenous people include the Chinantec, Mixe and Mixtec.

== Environmental concerns ==
The Sierra Juárez is home to threatened mammals such as jaguar (Panthera onca), ocelot (Leopardus pardalis), and brocket deer (genus Mazama). It is also a habitat for the threatened dwarf jay (Cyanloyca nanus), and is the richest region in Mexico for butterflies. It is under stress from logging, agriculture, grazing, and colonization, and is potentially threatened by hydroelectric dams. There is no official plan to establish nature reserves. However, the region promotes ecotourism to help preserve the biosphere with various enterprises offering cabins, camping, access and guides for hiking and mountain-biking trails, horseback riding, bird-watching, and cave exploration.
