= Sierra Madre de Oaxaca =

Mountain range in southern Mexico

Coordinates: 17°00′N 96°30′W

- Sierra Norte de Oaxaca
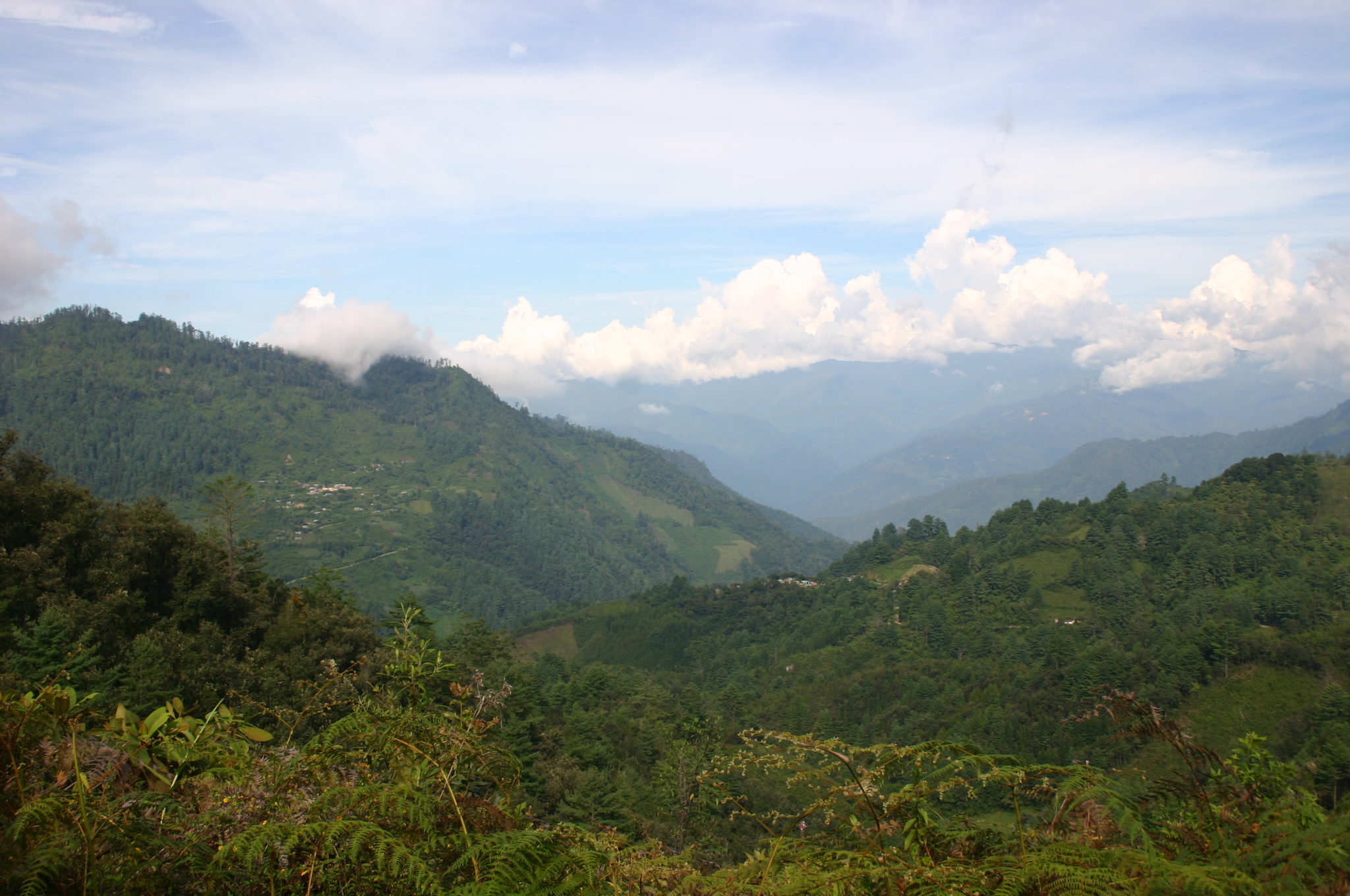
- View of the Sierra Juárez from San Juan Yagila, in the Rincon de Ixtlan Region, Oaxaca, Mexico

Geography
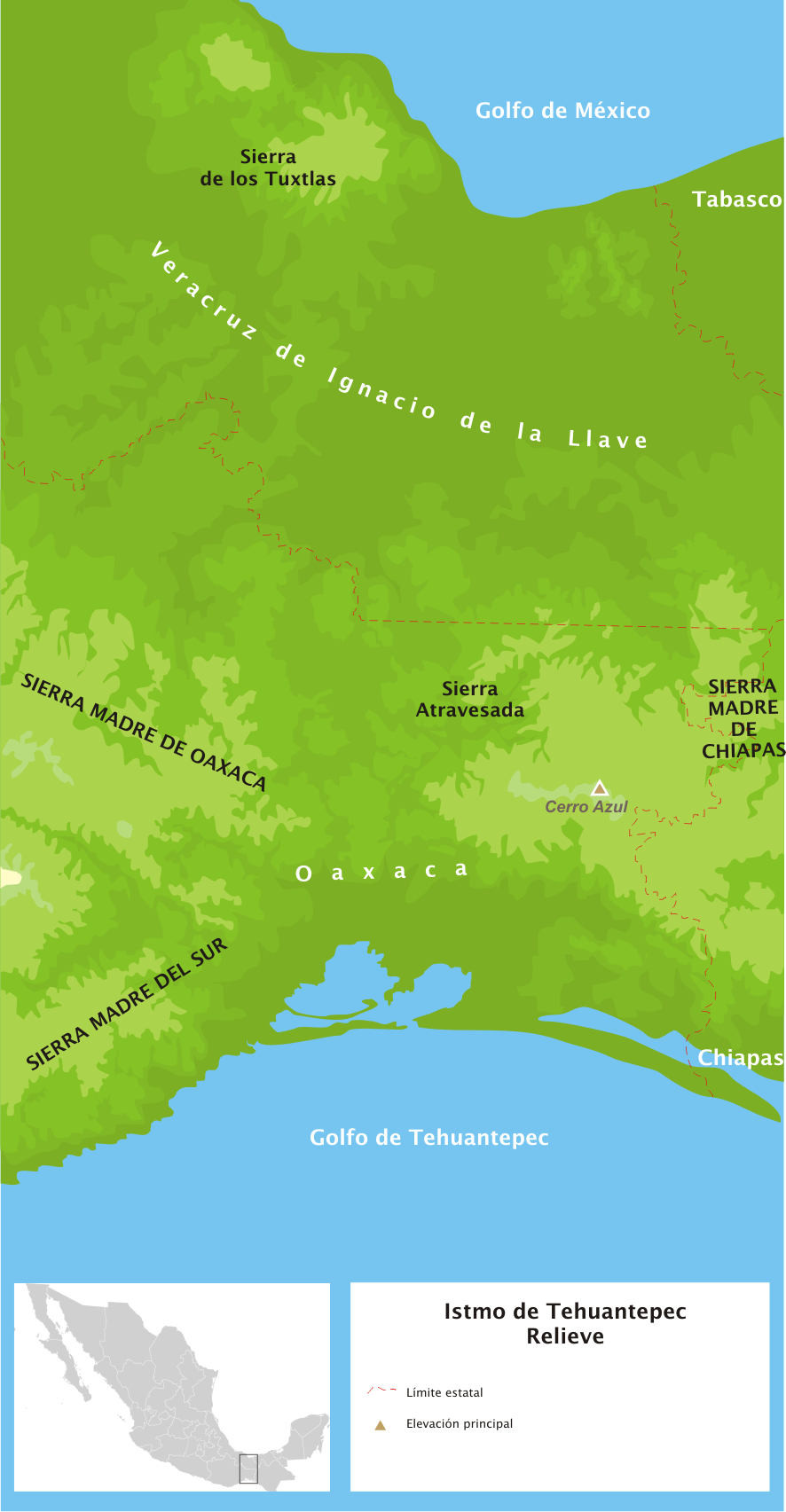
- Sierra Madre de Oaxaca lies west of Chivela Pass and north of the Sierra Madre del Sur range
- Country: Mexico
- Region: Oaxaca
- Parent range: Sierra Madre Oriental

The Sierra Madre de Oaxaca is a mountain range in southeastern Mexico. It is primarily in the state of Oaxaca, and extends north into the states of Puebla and Veracruz.

== Geography ==
The mountain range begins at Pico de Orizaba, and extends in a southeasterly direction for 300 km (190 mi) until reaching the Isthmus of Tehuantepec. Peaks in the Sierra Madre de Oaxaca average 2,500 m (8,200 ft) in elevation, with some peaks exceeding 3,000 m (9,800 ft). Cerro Zempoaltépetl is the highest peak in the range.

The Sierra is composed of several sub-ranges, including the Sierra de Zongolica–Sierra Mazateca between the Río Blanco canyon and the Santo Domingo River, the Sierra Juárez between the Santo Domingo and Cajones rivers, the Sierra de Villa Alta south of the Cajones River, the Sierra Ixtlán southwest of the Sierra Juárez, and the Sierra Mixe in the southeast.

The eastern slopes of the range are wetter, intercepting moisture-laden winds from the Gulf of Mexico. A number of drier valleys, including the Tehuacán and Cuicatlán valleys and Valley of Oaxaca, lie to the west in the rain shadow of the range.

Other major mountain range systems in the region are the Sierra Madre del Sur to the south and southwest along the Pacific coast, and the Sierra Madre de Chiapas to the east across the Isthmus of Tehuantepec.

The Blanco River rises at the northern end of the range, and cuts a large canyon through the Sierra on its way to the Gulf of Mexico. The Papaloapan River drains much of the northern and central Sierra, including both the eastern and western slopes of the range, before emptying into the Gulf of Mexico. At the eastern end, the northern slopes are drained by tributaries of the Coatzacoalcos River. The southern slopes are drained by several rivers, including the Verde-Atoyac and Tehuantepec, which empty into the Pacific.

Much of the Sierra is composed of Jurassic-Cretaceous limestone. Water has in many places eroded the limestone into karst topography, including several large cave systems. These include the Chevé Caves (−1536 m) in the Sierra Juaréz, and the Huautla Caves (−1560 m) in the Sierra Mazateca.

== Ecology ==
The Sierra Madre de Oaxaca pine-oak forests ecoregion lies above 1,600 metres (5,200 ft) in elevation. The humid Oaxacan montane forests ecoregion lies below 1,600 metres (5,200 ft) in elevation, on the eastern slopes above the Veracruz lowlands. To the east, the xeric Tehuacan Valley matorral ecoregion occupies the Tehuacan valley to the northwest, the Balsas dry forests ecoregion occupies the upper basin of the Santo Domingo River, which lies in the rain shadow of the Sierra Madre de Oaxaca. The Southern Pacific dry forests ecoregion lies to the south along the Pacific Coast of Mexico, extending into the upper basin of the Tehuantepec River and the Valley of Oaxaca.

== Subranges ==
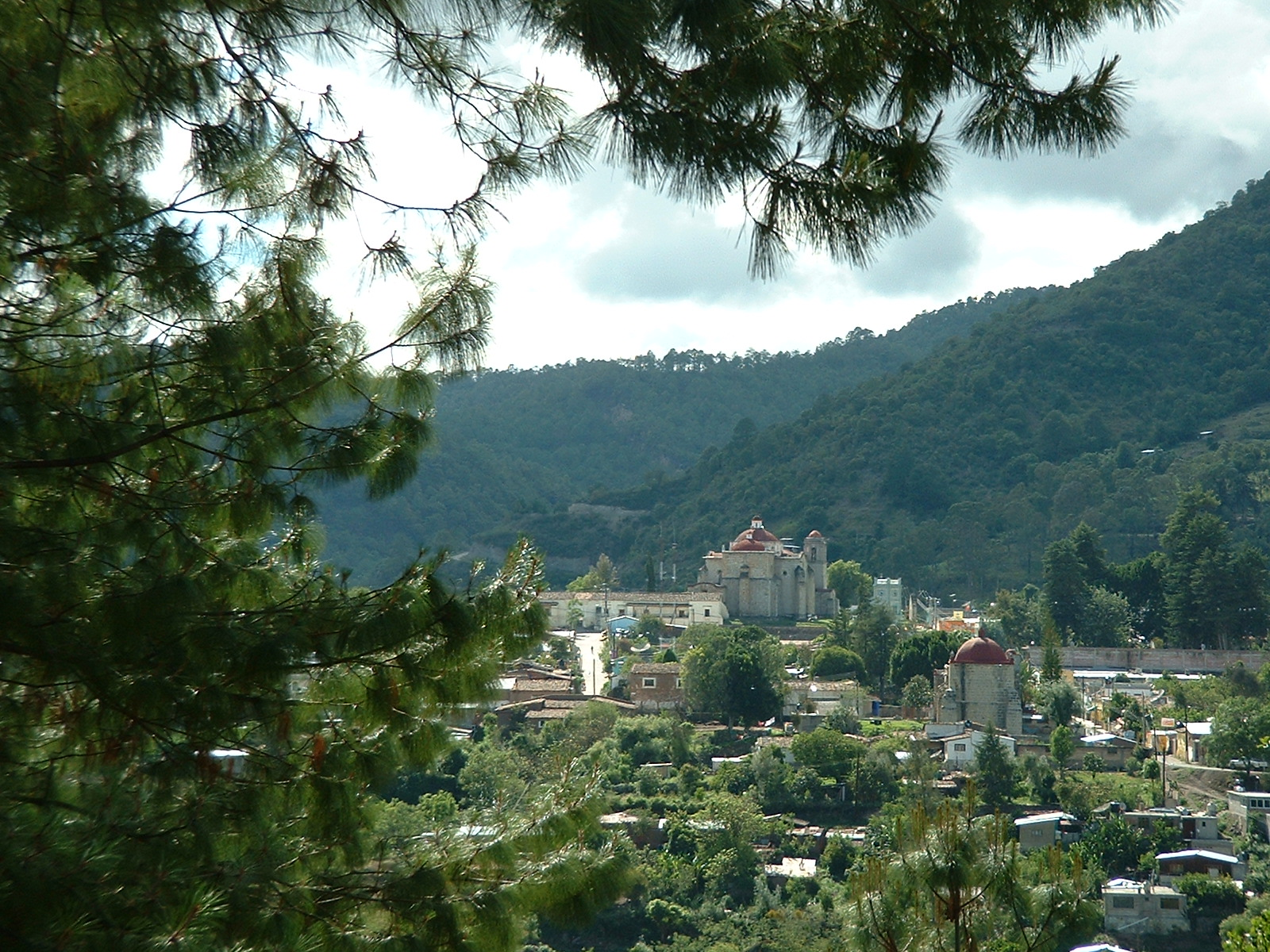
Ixtlan de Juárez is an important Zapotec town in the Sierra Juarez region

Culturally and geographically, the Sierra Madre de Oaxaca System can be split into many smaller sierras or subranges, each with unique ecologies and human cultures.

The Sierra Mazateca, located in northwestern Oaxaca state, reach elevations around 2,600 metres (8,500 ft). Cerro Rabon is its most unusual peak, albeit not its highest, the whale shaped "Holy Mountain of the Mazatecs". It is the homeland of the Mazatec people. Important towns include: Huautla de Jiménez, Eloxochitlán de Flores Magón, and Jalapa de Díaz.

The Sierra de Cuicatlan, south of the Sierra Mazateca, are a range which divides the low canyonlands of Cuicatlan from the Sierra Juarez to the west and is home to the Cuicatec people.

The Sierra Juárez is the land of the Sierra Zapotecs. It is the birthplace of Mexico's only indigenous president, Benito Juárez. The main towns of the Sierra Juarez are Ixtlan de Juárez, San Ildefonso Villa Alta, and Villa Hidalgo Yalalag.

The Sierra Chinanteca, north of the Sierra Juárez, are home to Chinantec towns including Santiago Comaltepec, San Pedro Yolóx and San Felipe Usila.

The Sierra Mixe, as the Sierra Madre de Oaxaca descends towards the Isthmus of Tehuantepec, home to the Mixe people, descendants of the ancient Olmecs of Mexico's Gulf Coast, lies to the east. The major Mixe centers are San Pablo and San Pedro Ayutla, Santiago Zacatepec, and Santa María Totontepec, and the major peak of the area is Zempoateptl, the sacred mountain of the Mixe people.

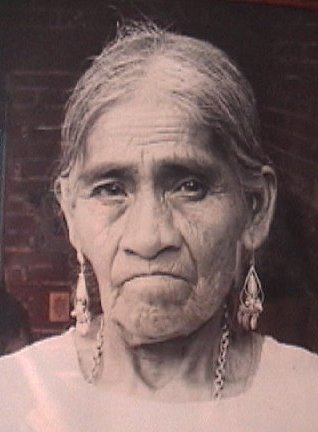
María Sabina.

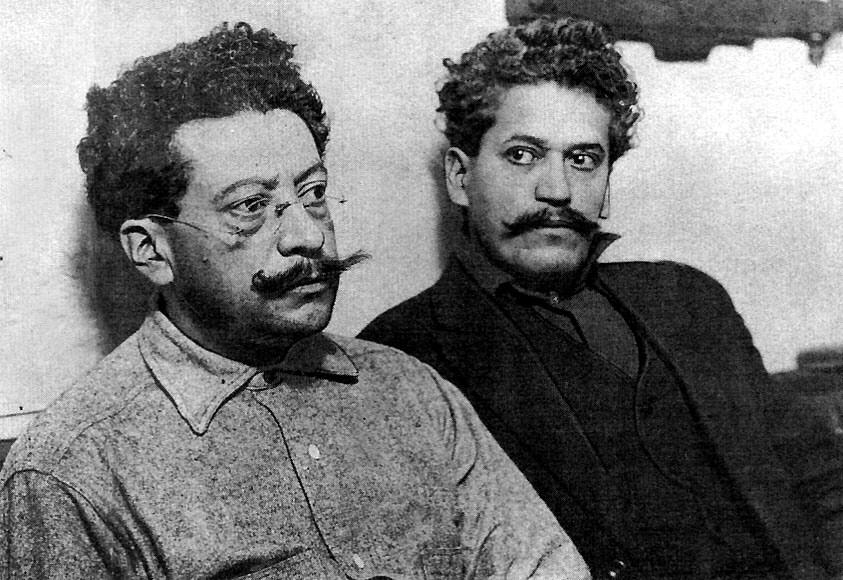
Ricardo Flores Magón (left) and brother Enrique Flores Magón in the Los Angeles County Jail (1916)

== Notable people ==
- Benito Juárez: First indigenous president of Mexico, born in the Zapotec community now called Guelatao de Juárez in his honour.
- Ricardo Flores Magón and Enrique Flores Magón: the two famous Mexican anarchists and founders of Magonismo were born in the Sierra Mazateca, along with their brother Jesus Flores Magón, a more moderate politician.
- María Sabina: Mazatec curandera from Huautla de Jiménez

== See also ==
- Sierra Madre de Oaxaca topics
- Mountain ranges of Mexico
- Sierra Madre de Oaxaca pine-oak forests
- Sierra Norte de Oaxaca — region of the range.
