= Valle Nacional River =

Location
- Country: Mexico
- State: Oaxaca

Physical characteristics
- Source
  - location: Sierra Juárez, Oaxaca
- Mouth
  - location: Papaloapan River

The Valle Nacional River is a river of Oaxaca state in Mexico. The river originates in the Sierra Juárez. The ecology of the region, originally one of pine forests, is threatened by logging, agriculture and grazing. The Valle Nacional flows past San Juan Bautista Valle Nacional, and joins the Santo Domingo River to the southwest of San Juan Bautista Tuxtepec to form the Papaloapan River.

== See also ==
- List of rivers of Mexico
