= Papaloapan River =

Coordinates: 18°42′N 95°38′W

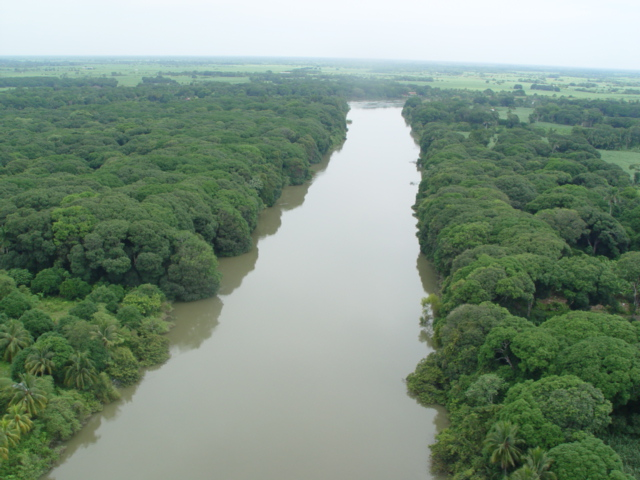

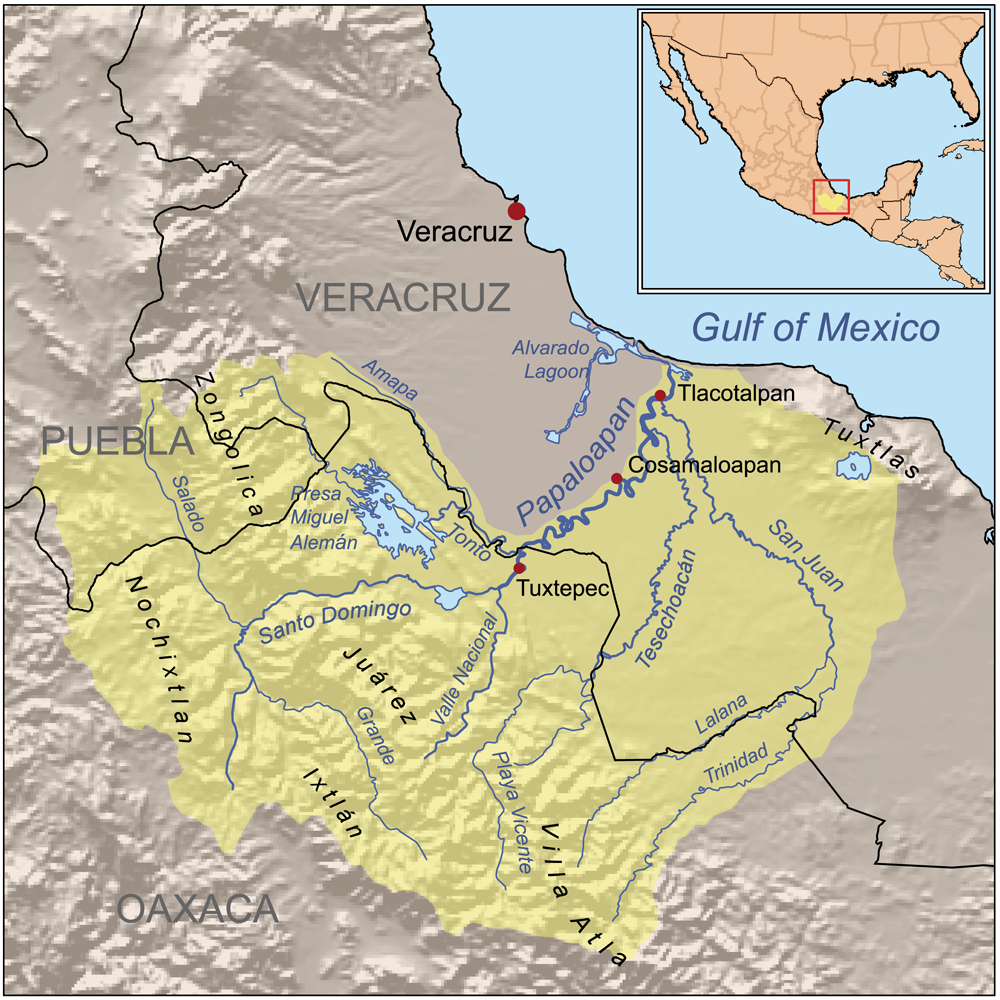
- Map of the Papaloapan River drainage basin before construction of the Cerro de Oro Dam

Location
- Country: Mexico
- States: Oaxaca, Veracruz
- Cities: Tuxtepec, Otatitlán, Tlacojalpan, Chacaltianguis, Cosamaloapan, Carlos A. Carrillo, Amatitlán, Tlacotalpan, Alvarado

Physical characteristics
- Source: Río Grande (Oaxaca)
  - location: Santa María Yavesía, Oaxaca
  - elevation: 3,700 m (12,100 ft)
- Mouth: Gulf of Mexico
  - location: Alvarado municipality, Veracruz
  - elevation: 0 m (0 ft)
- Length: 354 km (220 mi)
- Basin size: 46,517 km^{2} (17,960 sq mi)

The Papaloapan River (Spanish: Río Papaloapan) is one of the main rivers of the Mexican state of Veracruz. Its name comes from the Nahuatl papaloapan meaning "river of the butterflies".

In 1518 Juan de Grijalva's expedition spotted the river, naming it Río de Alvarado. The Papaloapan rises in the Sierra Madre de Oaxaca on the border between the states of Veracruz and Oaxaca. It is formed where the Santo Domingo River and the Valle Nacional River join to the southwest of San Juan Bautista Tuxtepec in Oaxaca. The Tonto River is another major tributary. The Papaloapan meanders for 122 km (76 mi) in a northeasterly direction through the coastal plain before draining into Alvarado Lagoon. The river basin covers 46,517 km^{2} (17,960 sq mi), the second largest in Mexico, and contains 244 municipalities with a population of about 3.3 million people. The cities of San Juan Bautista Tuxtepec and Tlacotalpan (Veracruz) are situated on the banks of the Papaloapan.

In the past the Papaloapan river basin was subject to frequent flooding, with the damage sometimes compounded by cyclones. A particularly severe flood in September 1944 covered 470,000 hectares (1,200,000 acres), with great loss of life and property. The Miguel Alemán Dam on the Tonto river reduced the problem, but further floods occurred after it had been completed in 1955. A flood in 1958 covered 195,000 ha (480,000 acres) and one in 1969 covered 340,000 ha (840,000 acres). Meanwhile, the drainage capacity of the Papaloapan river was being reduced by silt carried by the Santo Domingo river. Construction of the Cerro de Oro Dam in 1989 on the Santo Domingo river reduced the extent of floods to a manageable level.

The states of Oaxaca and Veracruz are cooperating in developing the river basin. Plans include irrigation to improve agricultural production, promotion of forestry and fish farming and improvements to roads and river navigation. The planned projects will be designed to avoid ecological damage. Environmental damage has been the subject of considerable study.

== See also ==
- List of longest rivers of Mexico
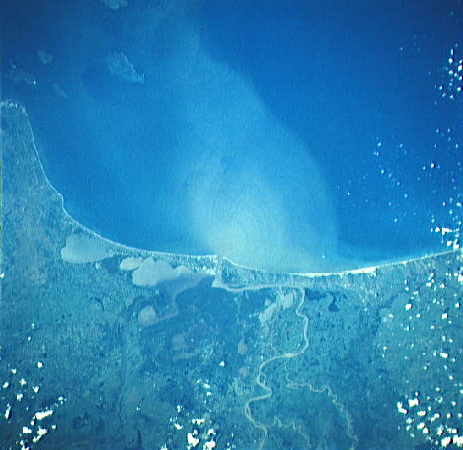
Satellite picture of the Papaloapan River ending at the Gulf of Mexico

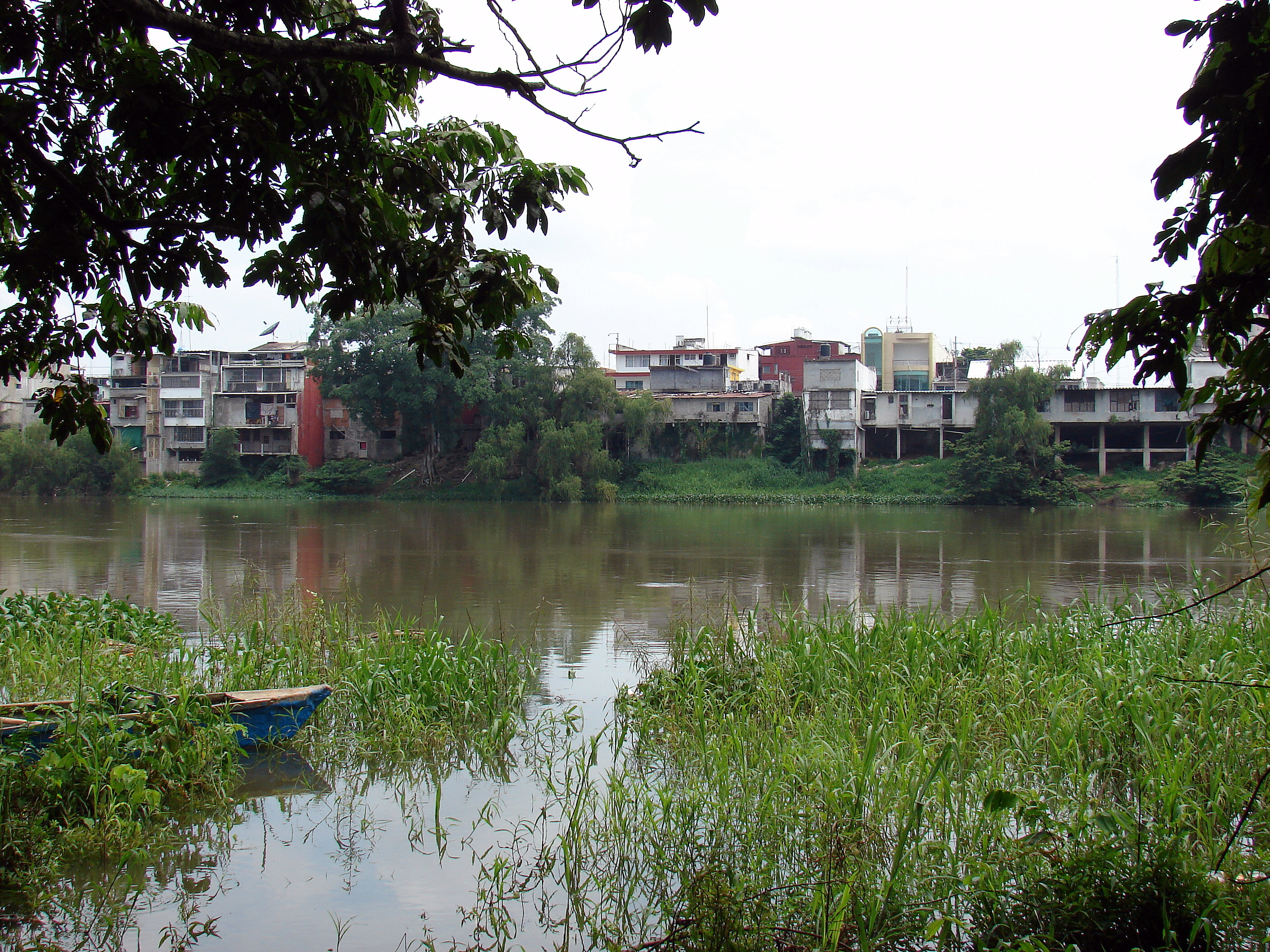
The Papaloapan at Tuxtepec

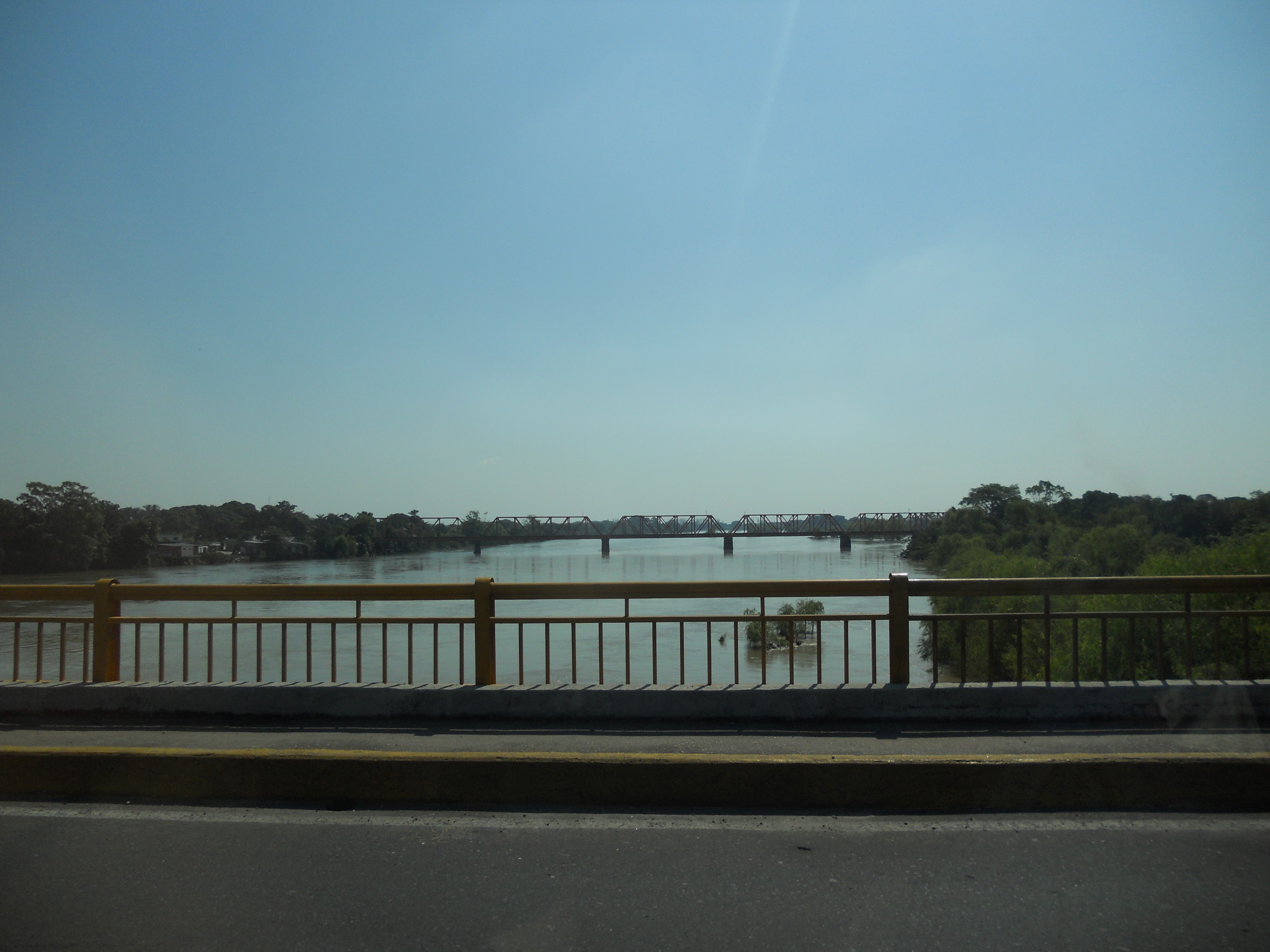
View of the river

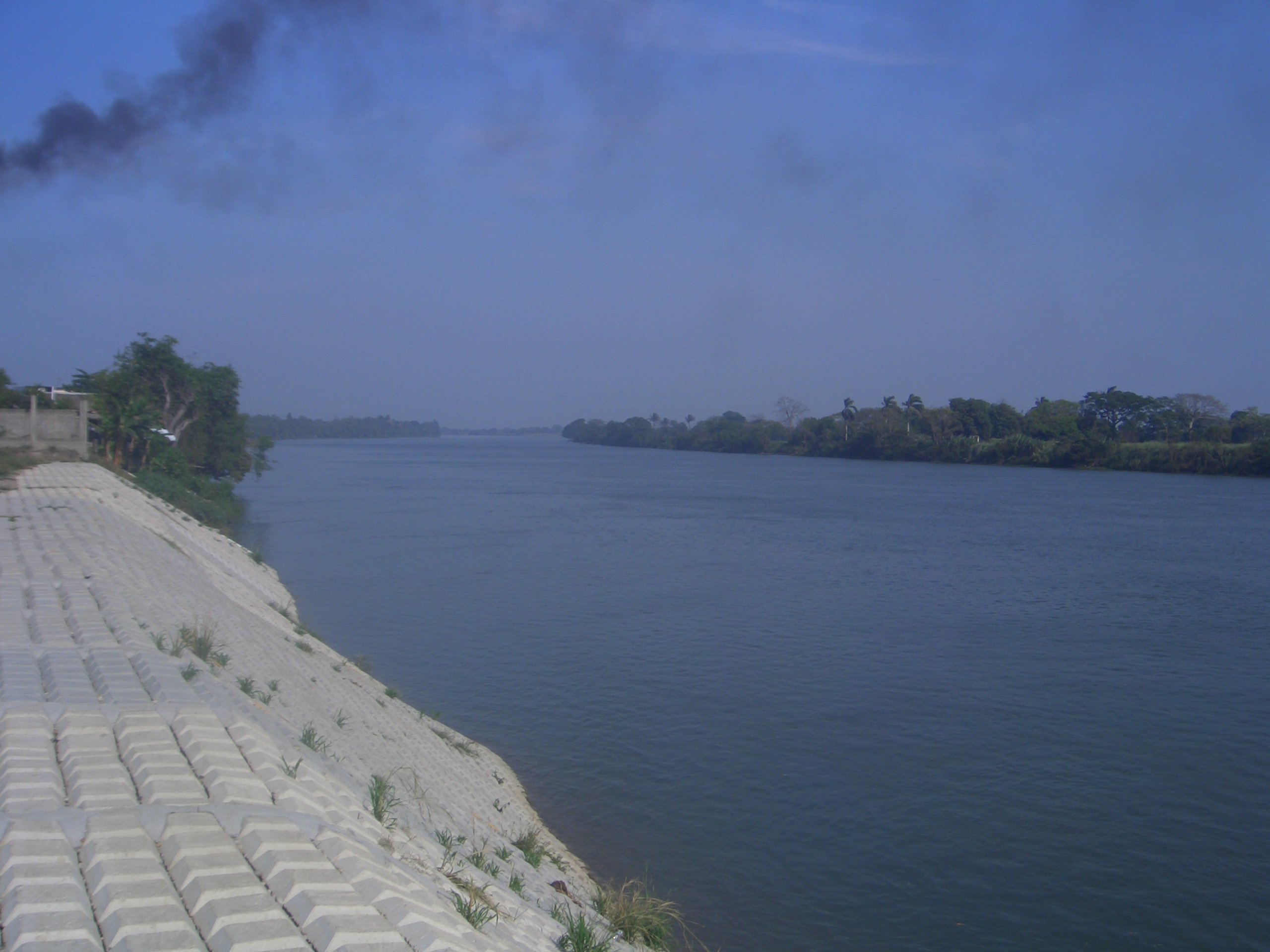
Papaloapan river in front of Carlos A. Carrillo, Veracruz.

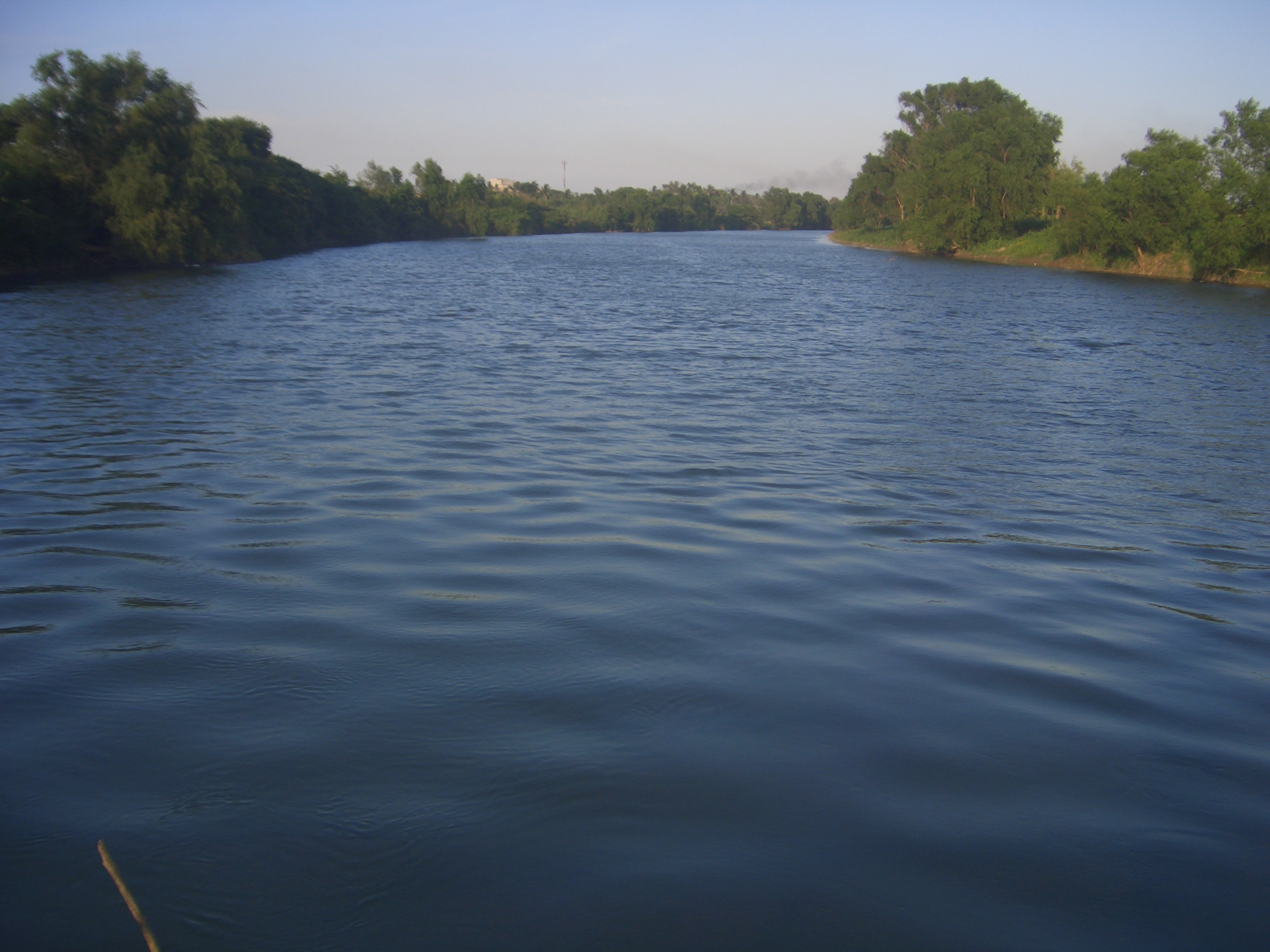
Papaloapan River in front of Cosamaloapan
