= Cajonos =

Cajonos may refer to:

== Geography ==
- San Pedro Cajonos, Oaxaca
- San Mateo Cajonos, Oaxaca
- San Francisco Cajonos, Oaxaca

== History ==
- Martyrs of Cajonos

== Languages ==
- Cajonos Zapotec
