= Santa María Temaxcalapa =

- Municipality and town
- Location in Mexico
- Coordinates: 20°23′N 98°12′W
- Country: Mexico
- State: Oaxaca
- Time zone: UTC-6 (Central Standard Time)

Santa María Temaxcalapa is a town and municipality in Oaxaca in south-western Mexico. The municipality covers an area of km^{2}. It is part of the Villa Alta District in the center of the Sierra Norte Region. As of 2005, the municipality had a total population of . It is bordered on the north by San Juan Yatzona and San Ildefonso Villa Alta, on the south San Cristóbal Lachirioag and San Ildefonso Villa Alta, on the east by San Ildefonso Villa Alta, west to San Juan Yatzona, Villa Talea de Castro and San Cristóbal Lachirioag. Its distance to the state capital is 149 miles.

== History ==
No one knows the time of the founding of this town as well as those who were its founders. Their titles have been provided by the judge proprietary sharing uncultivated lands and waters, Francisco Valenzuela Venegas on January 13, 1718.

== Demography ==
According to the results presented in the Second Census of Population and Housing in 2005, in the municipality live a total of 826 people who speak an indigenous language.

The City of Santa Maria Temaxcalapan has a total of 252 houses, where meets a total of 924 people, with an average of 3.5 people per house. Total potable water systems are 1 and home drinking water intakes installed is 210 of which 210 are domestic footage. Sources of water supply, there are 1 for each lake, the volume of water on average daily extraction is 44 per lake. In terms of power, of the 241 properties for this resource, 240 have it, while 1 does not have this service.
