= San Juan Mazatlán =

- Municipality and town
- Location in Mexico
- Coordinates: 17°02′N 95°26′W
- Country: Mexico
- State: Oaxaca

Area
  - Total: 1,990.28 km^{2} (768.45 sq mi)
- Elevation: 520 m (1,710 ft)

Population (2005)
  - Total: 16,138
- Time zone: UTC-6 (Central Standard Time)

San Juan Mazatlán is a town and municipality in Oaxaca in southeastern Mexico and is the third largest municipality in Oaxaca behind San Carlos Yautepec and Santa María Chimalapa. It is part of the Sierra Mixe district within the Sierra Norte de Oaxaca Region. Mazatlán's name in Nahuatl means "the place of deer".

== Geography ==
The municipality covers an area of 1990.28 km^{2}. The town is 520 meters above sea level. The climate is temperate, with an average temperature of 20 °C, and humid.

=== Flora and fauna ===
Local flowers include tulip, marigold, bougainvillea, gardenia and margarita. The forests contain pine, cedar, ceiba, mamey, huanacasle, caobilla and cypress, with fruit provided by oranges, tangerines, custard apples, mangoes and avocados.

Local birds are pheasant, chachalacas, ostrich, quail, parrots, parakeets, toucans and perníz. Wild animals include mountain lions, pumas, bobcats, leopards, tapirs, weasels, mouse, gopher, rabbit, anteater, and raccoons. There are various types of snake including deaf adder, boa, coral, and rattlesnake, as well as chameleons, lizards and iguanas.

== Economy ==
As of 2005, the municipality had 3,319 households with a total population of 16,138 of whom 8,543 spoke an indigenous language. Most homes have dirt floors, tiled or sheet metal roofs and walls of adobe and brick. The municipal seat is connected by dirt road to the main highway that leads to Matías Romero.

The people mostly grow coffee in the main town and in the communities of San Pedro Chimaltepec, Santiago Malacatepec, La Nueva Esperanza, Santa María Villa Hermosa, San Pedro Acatlán, Loma Santa Cruz, San Antonio del Valle, Rancho Juárez and Monte Aguila. The Union of Indigenous Communities of the Isthmus Region, a cooperative founded in 1982, assists in production and distribution of the local products, notably coffee, under a fair trade label.

The people also cultivate corn, beans and peppers of various kinds for their own use. Some communities grow lemon, oranges, mandarins and mamey. There is very small scale cattle breeding, and more deer ("mazates") than cattle in the area.
