= Tanetze de Zaragoza =

- Municipality and town
- Location in Mexico
- Coordinates: 17°22′N 96°18′W
- Country: Mexico
- State: Oaxaca
- District: Villa Alta District

Area
  - Total: 58.69 km^{2} (22.66 sq mi)
- Elevation: 1,280 m (4,200 ft)

Population (2005)
  - Total: 1,581
- Time zone: UTC-6 (Central Standard Time)

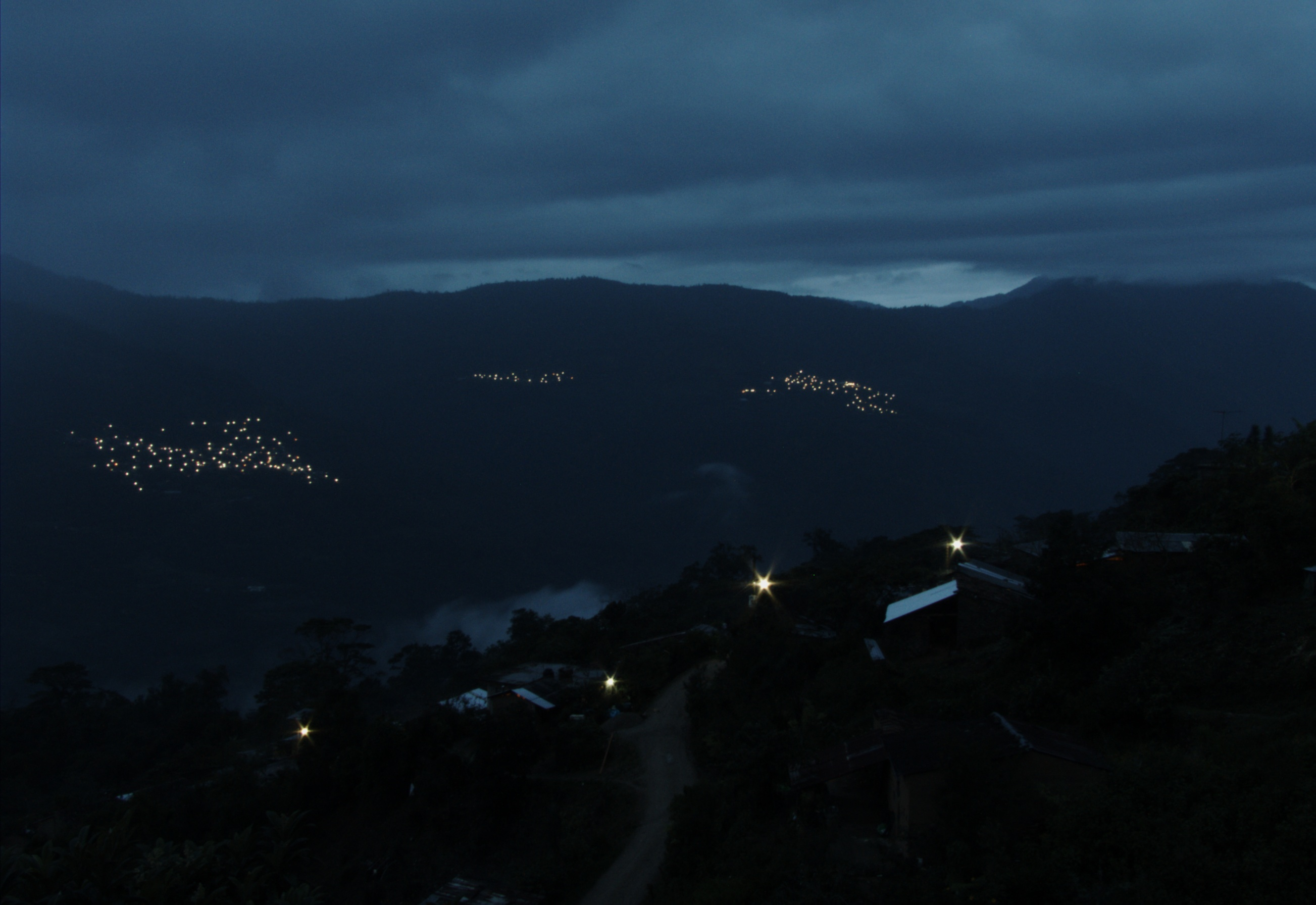
From left to right: Tanetze de Zaragoza, San Isidro Reforma, Juquila Vijanos Santo Domingo Cacalotepec

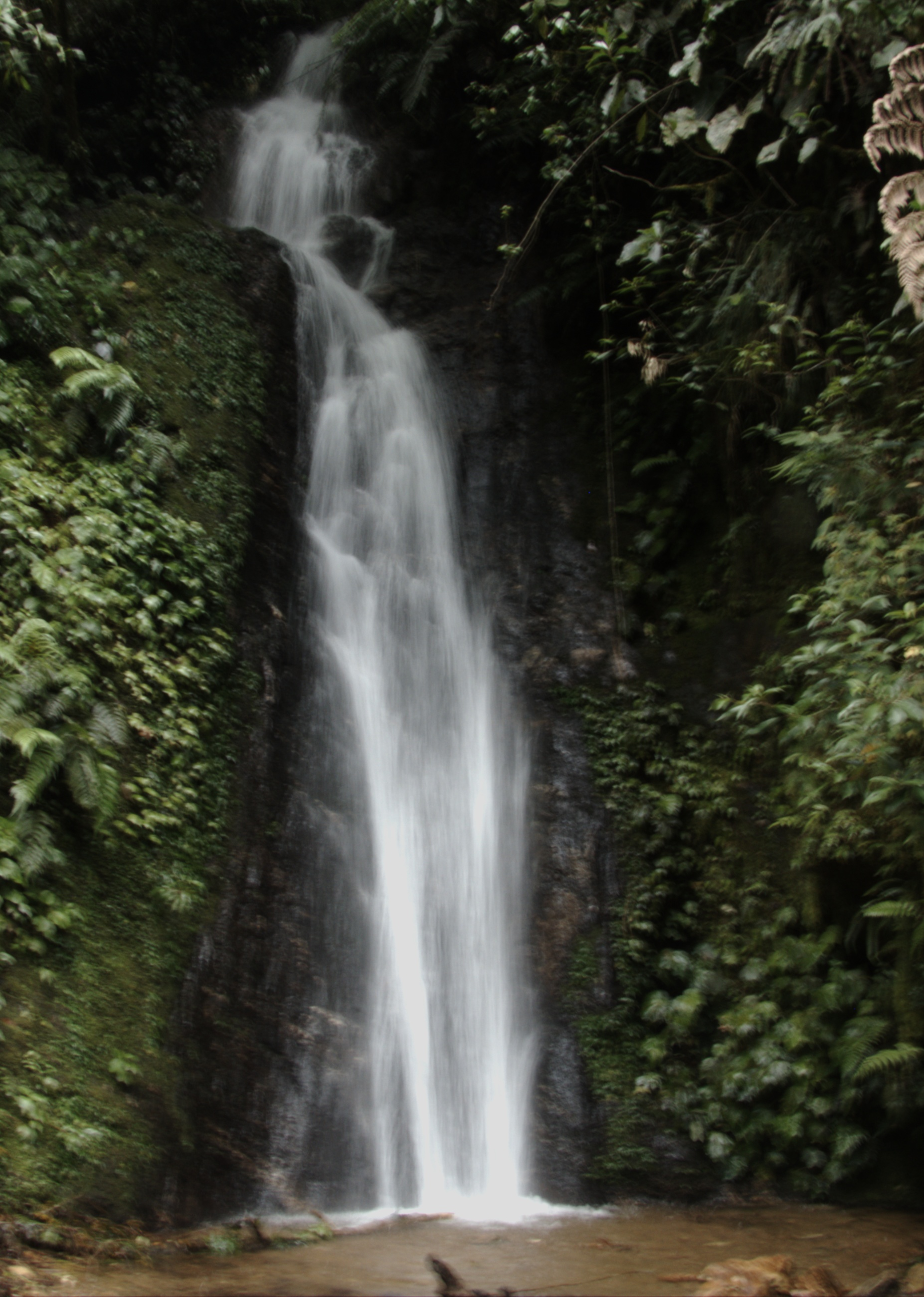
Waterfall near Tanetze

Tanetze de Zaragoza is a town and municipality in Oaxaca in south-western Mexico. It is part of the Villa Alta District in the center of the Sierra Norte Region. The name "Tanetze" means "hill of thorns".

== Geography ==
The municipality covers an area of 58.69 km^{2} in mountainous terrain. The town is at an elevation of 1,280 meters above sea level. The climate is cool, with prevailing winds from the north. Flora include pines and oaks, mamey, orange, mango and sapote. Wild fauna includes eagle, buzzard, deer and owls, wild boar and wild cat, rattlesnakes, and coral snakes.

== Population ==
As of 2005, the municipality had 431 houses with a total population of 1,581 of whom 1,327 spoke an indigenous language. Most of the population is engaged in cultivation of maize, beans and coffee. Logging is undertaken mainly for house building materials. Houses typically have dirt floors, adobe and brick walls, tin roofs, tiles. Some of the women in the community have formed a cooperative named "Yu-Van", which means "Living Earth" in the Zapotec language. The cooperative roasts and grinds their coffee harvest and sells it in the organic market in Oaxaca City, 6 hours away.

The region has seen violent confrontations between the authorities and members of the Popular Indigenous Council of Oaxaca "Ricardo Flores Magón", an activist organization of indigenous people. The Confederación Revolucionaria de Organizaciones Campesinas Unidas de Tuxtepec (CROCUT) (English: United Revolutionary Confederation of Peasant Organizations Tuxtepec) is also active in the area.
