= Santa María Guienagati =

- Municipality and town
- Location in Mexico
- Coordinates: 16°44′N 95°21′W
- Country: Mexico
- State: Oaxaca

Area
  - Total: 211.79 km^{2} (81.77 sq mi)
- Elevation: 310 m (1,020 ft)
- Time zone: UTC-6 (Central Standard Time)

Santa María Guienagati is a town and municipality in Oaxaca in south-western Mexico. It is in the north of the Tehuantepec District in the west of the Istmo Region. The town was first settled by Zapotec migrants from Zaachila, and the name Guienagati comes from Zapotec words meaning "Wilted Flower".

== Geography ==
The municipality covers an area of 211.79 km^{2}. The town is at an altitude of 310 meters above sea level. The area is mountainous, with a warm, dry climate. Vegetation includes pochote, cocoa, mahogany, guirisiña, cedar, pine, pitch pine and fruit trees. Wild fauna include deer, iguanas and armadillos. There is an ecotourism center in the Chayotopec community of the municipality, accessible from the town via a dirt road. The center provides accommodation and arranges hiking and birdwatching, visits to coffee production facilities and local food.

== Economy ==
As of 2005, the municipality had 656 households with a total population of 2,911 of whom 684 spoke an indigenous language. The town is connected by a paved road to Ciudad Ixtepec and is served by a bus run by the Union of Zapotec and Mixe People of the Isthmus (Spanish: Unión de Pueblos Zapotecos y Mixes del Istmo). The main economic activity is cultivation of coffee, corn and fruit. There is also some cattle farming, and hunting and fishing for private consumption. Some people are involved in logging.

In 1982 the farmers of Santa Maria Guienagati and Guevea de Humboldt, with advice from Jesuit mission team from the Diocese of Tehuantepec, formed the Union of Indigenous Communities of the Isthmus Region to help gain better prices for their coffee crop. They were later joined by farmers from other communities in the Sierra Mixe and northern Isthmus region. The cooperative, which gained legal status in 1983, assists in technical and financial assistance for local manufactures, as well as storage, transportation and national and international marketing of the products, of which the most important is coffee. As it matured, it paid increased attention to the requirements of women and youth, and to health, education and nutrition. The cooperative gained certification for its members' organic farming, and has established links to fair trade organizations to improve the prices received.
