= San Pedro Ocotepec =

- Municipality and town
- Location in Mexico
- Coordinates: 16°57′N 95°51′W
- Country: Mexico
- State: Oaxaca

Area
  - Total: 136.51 km^{2} (52.71 sq mi)

Population (2005)
  - Total: 2,171
- Time zone: UTC-6 (Central Standard Time)

San Pedro Ocotepec is a town and municipality in Oaxaca in south-western Mexico. The municipality covers an area of 136.51 km^{2}. It is part of the Sierra Mixe district within the Sierra Norte de Oaxaca Region.

As of 2005, the municipality had a total population of 2,171, of whom 1,933 spoke an indigenous language.
