= Atitlán =

Atitlán may refer to:

- Lago de Atitlán, a lake in Guatemala
- Santiago Atitlán, a municipality in the Sololá department of Guatemala
- Santiago Atitlán, Oaxaca, a town and municipality in south-western Mexico
- Volcán Atitlán, a volcano in Guatemala
