= Cajonos Zapotec =

Zapotec language of Oaxaca, Mexico

- Native to: Mexico
- Region: northern Oaxaca
- Native speakers: (5,000 in Mexico cited 1993)
- Language family: Oto-Manguean: Zapotecan; Zapotec; Sierra Norte; Zoogochoan; Cajonos Zapotec
- Dialects: Cajonos Zapotec; Yaganiza–Xagacía Zapotec; San Mateo Zapotec

Language codes
- ISO 639-3: zad
- Glottolog: cajo1238
- ELP: Villalta (shared)

Cajonos Zapotec (Southern Villa Alta Zapotec, Zapoteco de San Pedro Cajonos) is a Zapotec language of Oaxaca, Mexico. It is spoken in several towns named Cajonos, as well as, San Pedro Cajonos, San Pablo Yaganiza and Xagacía. There are significant differences with the dialects of the latter.
