= Ayutla =

Ayutla may refer to:

- Ayutla, San Marcos, a municipality in the San Marcos department of Guatemala.
- Ayutla de los Libres, a small town located in the Mexican state of Guerrero.
- Ayutla, Jalisco, a town in the Mexican state of Jalisco.
- San Felipe Ayutla, a town in Izúcar de Matamoros, Puebla.
- The Plan of Ayutla was proclaimed in Ayutla, Guerrero.
- San Pedro y San Pablo Ayutla, Oaxaca
