= YAA =

YAA or yaa may refer to:

- Yorkshire Arts Association
- Young at Art Museum
- Young Artist Award
- European Film Academy Young Audience Award
- Youth Against AIDS, a disbanded international youth network founded in 1999
- Anahim Lake Airport, Anahim Lake, British Columbia, Canada
- Yodh, the tenth semitic letter. Named Yāʾ, Yaa or Ya'a in Arabic.
- Yaa dialect, a dialect of West Teke, a Bantu language spoken in the Republic of Congo and Gabon
- Yaminawa language (ISO 639-3: yaa), a Panoan language in Western Amazonia
- Yuya, Egyptian courtier during the eighteenth dynasty (c. 1390 BC)
- San Andrés Yaá, Oaxaca, Mexico
- Yaa (name)
