= Tamazulapam =

Tamazulapam may refer to any of the following towns in Oaxaca, Mexico:

- Tamazulapam del Espíritu Santo
- Tamazulapam del Progreso
- Santo Tomás Tamazulapan
