= Asunción Cacalotepec =

- Municipality and town
- Location of the municipality in Oaxaca

- Location in Mexico
- Coordinates: 18°0′N 97°40′W
- Country: Mexico
- State: Oaxaca

Area
  - Total: 76.55 km^{2} (29.56 sq mi)

Population (2005)
  - Total: 753
- Time zone: UTC-6 (Central Standard Time)

Asunción Cacalotepec is a town and municipality in Oaxaca, Mexico. The municipality covers an area of 76.55 km^{2} (29.56 sq mi). It is part of the Sierra Mixe district within the Sierra Norte de Oaxaca Region. As of 2005, the municipality had a total population of 753.
