= Santiago Camotlán =

Town in Oaxaca, Mexico

- Municipality and town
- Location in Mexico
- Coordinates: 17°27′N 96°11′W
- Country: Mexico
- State: Oaxaca

Area
  - Total: 332.99 km^{2} (128.57 sq mi)
- Elevation: 1,380 m (4,530 ft)

Population (2005)
  - Total: 3,089
- Time zone: UTC-6 (Central Standard Time)

Santiago Camotlán is a town and municipality in Oaxaca in south-western Mexico. It is part of the Villa Alta District in the center of the Sierra Norte Region.

The municipality covers an area of 332.99 km^{2} at an elevation of 1,380 meters above sea level.

== Geography ==
The terrain is mountainous, with the valley watered by the Cajonos River. The climate is warm and humid.

=== Flora and fauna ===
Flora include encino, llavito, yazachi, cedar, greta, ocotal, hichipil, yatulita, stick eagle cacatillo, gladiolus, agape. Fauna include peacock, pheasant, hawk, leopard, tapir, chimpanzee, badger, wild boar, wild cat, fox, skunk, deer, marten, armadillo, brocket deer, fish, penguins, otters and crabs.

== Economy ==
As of 2005, the municipality had 691 households with a total population of 3,089 of whom 2,461 spoke an indigenous language. 75% of the inhabitants are farmers, growing corn, beans and coffee. A small number raise cattle. The forest resources are not exploited. The Union of Indigenous Communities of the Isthmus Region, a cooperative founded in 1982, assists in production and distribution of the local products, notably coffee, under a fair trade label.
