= Quetzaltepec =

Quetzaltepec can refer to:

- San Miguel Quetzaltepec, Oaxaca
- San Salvador (volcano) (Quetzaltepec is the native name for the volcano.)
- Quezaltepeque, Chiquimula, in Guatemala
