= San Juan Tabaá =

- Municipality and town
- Location in Mexico
- Coordinates: 17°18′N 96°12′W
- Country: Mexico
- State: Oaxaca

Area
  - Total: 26.79 km^{2} (10.34 sq mi)

Population (2005)
  - Total: 1,091
- Time zone: UTC-6 (Central Standard Time)

San Juan Tabaá is a town and municipality in Oaxaca in south-western Mexico. The municipality covers an area of 26.79 km^{2}. It is part of the Villa Alta District in the center of the Sierra Norte Region.

As of 2005, the municipality had a total population of 1,091.
