= San Baltazar =

San Baltazar may refer to:

== Language ==
- San Baltázar Loxicha Zapotec, a Zapotec language spoken in southern Oaxaca

== Places ==
Mexico

- San Baltazar Chichicapam, Oaxaca
- San Baltazar Loxicha, Oaxaca
- San Baltazar Yatzachi el Bajo, Oaxaca

== See also ==
- San Baltasar
