= Union of Indigenous Communities of the Isthmus Region =

The Union of Indigenous Communities of the Isthmus Region (Spanish: Unión de Comunidades Indígenas de la Región del Istmo, or UCIRI) is a farmer's cooperative in the state of Oaxaca, Mexico. It was established in 1982 to assist in production, marketing and distribution of locally produced coffee and other products. UCIRI was a pioneer of organic coffee production and one of the first fair trade suppliers.

== Early days ==
Until the late 1970s the small coffee farmers of the Santa Maria Guienagati and Guevea de Humboldt municipalities in the Tehuantepec District of the Istmo Region of Oaxaca did not have roads and transport to get their product to market, and lacked bargaining power with the freelance coffee buyers. However, loggers built rough roads in the 1970s, and the roads were maintained after the loggers left or were driven out. The producers began selling direct to Inmecafe, the Mexican Institute of Coffee, which paid more than the middlemen.

In 1982 the farmers of the two municipalities, with advice from a Jesuit mission team from the Diocese of Tehuantepec, formed the UCIRI to help gain better prices for their coffee crop. They were later joined by farmers from other communities in the Sierra Mixe and northern Isthmus region. UCIRI gained legal status in 1983 and established contact with ARIC (Asociaciones Rurales de Interés Colectivo), a growers organization which had part of the Mexican export quota under the International Coffee Agreement. Early years were difficult. The cooperative struggled to obtain financing and faced bureaucratic obstacles. They had to learn the many processes involved in producing and delivering a consistent product, from buying sacks to quality control and transport. They also had to learn all the financial aspects of running a business.

== Expansion ==
By 1986 the cooperative was producing more than the 8,000 sacks of coffee that could be absorbed by the "alternative trade" movement. The UCIRI launched an appeal that led directly to the creation of the Dutch Max Havelaar Foundation, which now unites 23 fair trade producer and labelling initiatives. The Max Havelaar label, the world's first Fairtrade Certification Mark, was officially launched by Stichting Max Havelaar on 15 November 1988. One of the founders of Max Havelaar, Frans van der Hoff, later joined the staff of UCIRI.

At first the government was hostile to the cooperative. On two occasions army units occupied UCIRI installations. Later it gained increasing respect from the state and federal governments. In 1997 the President of Mexico, Ernesto Zedillo, awarded the UCIRI the National Prize for ecological merits. By 1998 UCIRI included 49 communities in 19 municipalities with 2,050 members. In 1999 the cooperative sold 279 tons under FLO conditions. The dependence on Fair Trade steadily dropped from 85% in 1988 to 43% in 1999, with increasing volumes sold in the organic and domestic markets. As a pioneer in organic production, UCIRI is able to command premium prices.

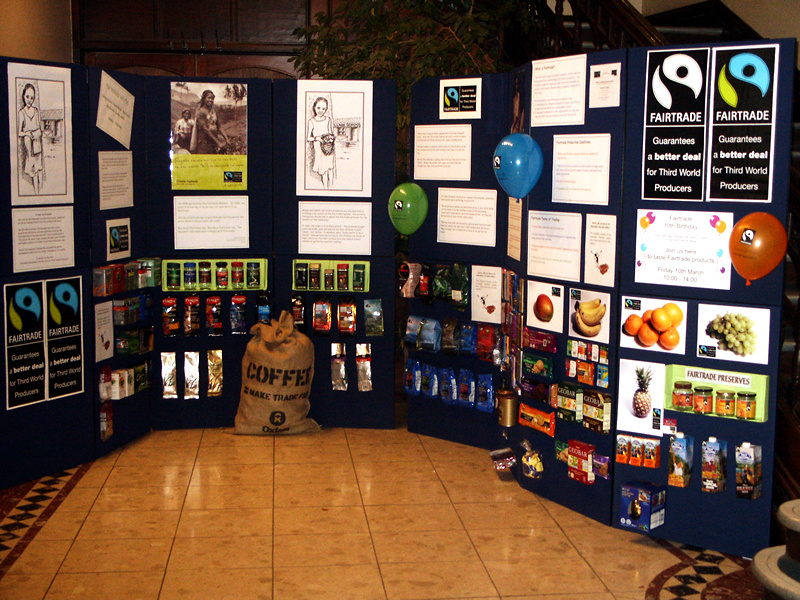
Fairtrade display, Derbyshire County Council head office.

By 2002, the UCIRI had expanded beyond the original Santa Maria Guienagati and Guevea de Humboldt municipalities to include Santo Domingo Petapa, Santiago Lachiguiri, Santiago Ixcuintepec, Santiago Atitlan, San Lucas Camotlan, San Juan Lachao, San Juan Mazatlan, San Juan Guichicovi, San Juan Cotzocon, Santa Catarina Juquila, San Juan Juquila Mixes, San Carlos Yautepec, Nejapa de Madero, San Miguel Quetzaltepec, San Pedro Huilotepec, Santa Maria Alotepec, Santiago Camotlan and Santo Domingo Tehuantepec. UCIRI now exports to Belgium, Canada, Denmark, Finland, France, Germany, Ireland, Italy, Japan, the Netherlands, Sweden, Switzerland and the USA.

== Operations ==
The organization is structured along grassroots democratic lines. Each community that is part of UCIRI names a board of directors and officials responsible for different aspects of the programs who serve for one or two years. Community representatives assemble in Lachiviza, Guienagati for two days each month to discuss issues and plans. The representatives then bring back reports from the assembly meetings for further discussion at local meetings. At the central level, UCIRI has a four-person Administrative Council and a four-person Monitoring Council, each of whom are elected for three-year terms.

The cooperative gives technical and financial assistance for local manufacture, handling storage and transportation as well as national and international marketing of the products, of which the most important is coffee. As the UCIRI has matured it has paid increased attention to the requirements of women and youth, health, education and nutrition. The concepts pioneered by the UCIRI have been adopted by a number of other organizations in Chiapas, Oaxaca, and Guatemala. In 2003, the Fair Trade Research Group at Colorado State University conducted seven case studies of Latin American Fairtrade coffee producers including UCIRI and concluded that Fair Trade has "in a short time greatly improved the well-being of small-scale coffee farmers and their families".
