= Santiago Ixcuintepec =

- Municipality and town
- Location in Mexico
- Coordinates: 16°56′N 95°37′W
- Country: Mexico
- State: Oaxaca

Area
  - Total: 102.07 km^{2} (39.41 sq mi)
- Elevation: 800 m (2,600 ft)

Population (2005)
  - Total: 1,441
- Time zone: UTC-6 (Central Standard Time)

Santiago Ixcuintepec is a town and municipality in Oaxaca in south-western Mexico. It is part of the Sierra Mixe district within the Sierra Norte de Oaxaca Region.

== Name ==
The name "Ixcuintepec" means "Dog Head Hill".

== Geography ==
The municipality covers an area of 102.07 km^{2}, with mountainous terrain. The climate is mild and humid.

=== Flora and fauna ===
Flora include pine and oak trees, tulip, red and purple bougainvillea, marigolds and rose of Castille flowers. Edible plants include squash, cassava, sweet potatoes, quintanilla and the Guille de chayote leaf and heart, as well as bananas, avocados, mamey, oranges, sapodilla, black sapote, mango and custard pineapple. Wild fauna include peacock, chachalaca, dove blue, toucans, orioles, mockingbirds, roadrunner, boa, deaf adder, coral and scorpion.

== Demography ==
As of 2005, the municipality had 305 households with a total population of 1,441, of which 1,124 spoke an indigenous language. 95% of the people are engaged in agriculture, cultivating maize, beans, wheat, fruits and vegetables. The Union of Indigenous Communities of the Isthmus Region, a cooperative founded in 1982, assists in production and distribution of the local products, under a fair trade label.
