= Salomón Jara =

Mexican politician (born 1959)

Governor of Oaxaca
- Incumbent
- Assumed office 1 December 2022
- Preceded by: Alejandro Murat Hinojosa

Senator of the Congress of the Union for Oaxaca
- In office 1 September 2018 – 16 December 2021 Serving with Susana Harp and Raúl Bolaños Cacho Cué
- Preceded by: Adolfo Romero Laines

Personal details
- Born: Salomón Jara Cruz; 15 September 1959 (age 66) San Melchor Betaza, Oaxaca, Mexico
- Party: MORENA (2014–present); PRD (1989–2013)
- Occupation: Politician

Salomón Jara Cruz (born 15 September 1959) is a Mexican politician who has served as governor of Oaxaca since December 2022. Currently affiliated with National Regeneration Movement (Morena), he previously belonged to the Party of the Democratic Revolution (PRD).

== Political career ==
Salomón Jara Cruz was born in San Melchor Betaza, Oaxaca, on 15 September 1959. He holds a degree in chemical engineering from the National Polytechnic Institute (IPN).

For the PRD, he was elected to the Chamber of Deputies as a plurinominal deputy in the 1991 mid-terms (55th Congress, 1991–1994). He later served in the Senate for Oaxaca, on the PRD ticket, during the 60th and 61st sessions of Congress (2006–2012).

In the 2018 general election, as a member of Morena, he was re-elected to the Senate for the state of Oaxaca for the 64th and 65th congressional sessions (2021–2024).

Jara Cruz resigned his Senate seat on 16 December 2021 to contend for the governorship of Oaxaca in the 5 June 2022 state elections. He received over 60% of the votes cast and was sworn in as governor on 1 December 2022.
