= Yatzachi Zapotec =

Oto-Manguean of Mexico

- Dižə'əxon
- Pronunciation: [diʒəˤˈʐon]
- Region: Oaxaca in Mexico
- Native speakers: (2,500 cited 1990 census)
- Language family: Oto-Manguean: Zapotecan; Zapotec; Sierra Norte; Zoogochoan; Yatzachi Zapotec

Official status
- Regulated by: Instituto Nacional de Lenguas Indígenas

Language codes
- ISO 639-3: zav
- Glottolog: yatz1235
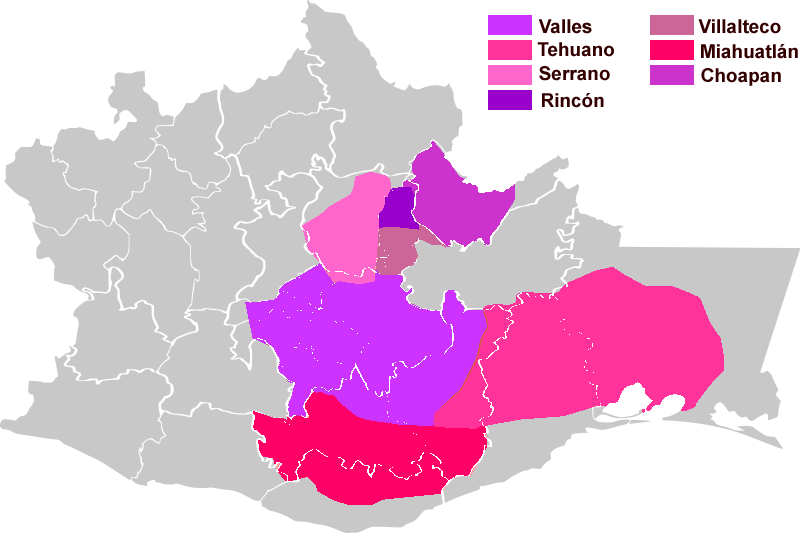
- Zapotecan languages in Oaxaca. The Yatzachi dialect is found in the Villalteco region.

Yatzachi Zapotec is an Oto-Manguean language of the Zapotecan branch, spoken in northern central Oaxaca, Mexico. 2,500 self-reported being Yatzachi speakers for the 1990 Mexican census, but the actual number of speakers is unknown. The Yatzachi dialect belongs to the Villa Alta group of Zapotec dialects, of which the main dialect is San Bartolomé Zoogocho. The degree of mutual intelligibility between Yatzachi and the San Bartolomé Zoogocho dialect is estimated to be around 90 percent.

== Phonology ==
=== Vowels ===
Yatzachi Zapotec has six vowels. The a, e, and i are the same as these vowels in Spanish. In earlier forms of Zapotec, there was a sound between o and u, which in the case of Yatzachi Zapotec was closer to the o sound, but in other Zapotec dialects was more of a u sound. In the modern Yatzachi dialect, both the o and the u sound exist, although the u is only found in Spanish loanwords.

In addition, Yatzachi Zapotec has a schwa sound. This sound is more neutral and has a tendency to adapt to the adjacent sounds and is not used in stressed syllables. It is often difficult to distinguish between the schwa and e sound, however minimal pairs exist such as in zide´ "wine" and zidə´ "sticky," making a distinction between the two sounds necessary.

	Front	Central	Back
Close	i		u
Mid	e	ə	o
Open		a	

=== Consonants ===
In Yatzachi Zapotec, it is easier to think of consonants as having a distinction between fortis and lenis rather than voiced and voiceless. Fortis describes sounds that require a greater effort to articulate, while lenis describes sounds that require lesser effort. Voiced sounds are lenis, and sounds that are either voiceless or aspirated are considered fortis.

A distinction between aspirated and non-aspirated sounds occurs on the consonants ch, x, l, and n. Yatzachi Zapotec also contains many Spanish loanwords, and thus borrows letters from Spanish orthography to write these sounds, such as ñ and ll [ʎ]. The digraph rr (also borrowed from Spanish) is used when the trilled r occurs medially in a word, however a single r is used to represent the trill at the beginning or end of a word. Elsewhere, a single r represents a tap consonant. Zapotec also features rounded or labialized consonants which are written as digraphs with the consonant followed by a w such as jw, gw, and cw. The places of articulation are identical to j, g, and c, respectively. Occasionally the w is replaced by u which is more in accordance with Spanish orthography in which w does not normally exist. The saltillo, or glottal stop, is found after vowels or the sound n and counts as a distinct phoneme, as illustrated with the minimal pairs ga "new," and ga´ "green."

In the table below, the bold letters represent the way the sound is written according to Yatzachi Zapotec orthography, and the symbols in brackets reflect the sound as written in the International Phonetic Alphabet.

		Labial	Dental	Alveolar	Alveopalatal	Retroflex	Palatal	Velar		Uvular	Glottal
		Labial	Dental	Alveolar	Alveopalatal	Retroflex	Palatal	unrounded	rounded	Uvular	Glottal
Plosive	fortis	p [pʰ]	t [tʰ]					c [kʰ]	cw [kʷ]		
Plosive	lenis	b [b]	d [d]					g [g]	gw [gʷ]		´ [ʔ]
Fricative	fortis	f [f]		s [s]	y [ɕ]	xʰ [ʂʰ]	š [ʃ]	j [x]	jw [xʷ]	ʝ [χ]	
Fricative	lenis			z [z]		x [ʐ]	ž [ʒ]				
Affricate	fortis						ch [tʃʰ]				
Affricate	lenis						ch [tʃ]				
Nasal	fortis			n [n]			ñ [ɲ]				
Nasal	lenis	m [m]		n [nʰ]							
Lateral	fortis			l [lʰ]							
Lateral	lenis			l [l]			ll [ʎ]				
Rhotic	fortis			r [ɾ]; rr [r:]							

=== Tone ===
The Villa Alta Zapotec dialects have three tones: high /^{1}/, mid /^{2}/, and low /^{3}/. The differences in these tones can be identified with the use of contrastive sets. The idea of contrastive sets is similar to the use of minimal pairs to identify phonemes. For example, de^{3}za^{1}n ya^{1} "a lot of bamboo" versus de^{3}za^{1}n ya^{2} "many steam baths". In this case, the difference between the high and mid tones is shown in the last syllable.

== Morphology ==
=== Nouns ===
==== Gender and Number ====
Most Zapotec nouns do not vary morphologically in gender or number. There are two ways to tell whether a given noun is plural; (1) the noun is accompanied by a quantifier such as a number, or (2) if a noun is the subject of a sentence, then the verb of the sentence will be in the plural form.

Certain nouns in Zapotec have the ability to use affixes that indicate possession; however, there are others that are invariable in this respect. For example, the word bia

- bia chʰe Bed "Pedro's animal"
- bia chʰebo' "his animal"

In the second case, the preposition chʰe, "of" carries an inseparable pronoun that indicates that "of" is being used to show possession of the third person singular.

This is also the case with certain nouns that are obligatorily possessive, such as body parts or family members, which technically must always belong to someone. In this case, the owner is indicated either with an inseparable pronoun or a noun that follows the verb.

- yichʰʝa' "my head"
- yichʰʝo' "your head"
- yichʰʝe' "his head"

Other nouns mark possession with the prefix x-. This indicates that the object named belongs to someone. The owner is indicated by either a pronoun attached to the noun or by a noun that follows it.

- xʝeid "(someone)'s hen"
- xʝeid Masə "Max's hen"
- xʝeida' "my hen"

=== Verbs ===
==== Aspectual Markers ====
In Zapotec languages, the aspect of the verb is denoted by a prefix or prefixes. The aspect describes how and when an action occurs. It indicates whether the action continues for some time or ends in a given moment. Although the prefixes are called aspect markers, they really are tense markers as well.

- Continuative Aspect

All verbs in the continuative aspect begin with the morpheme ch, which refers to an action that is still occurring while the speaker is talking. For example, Ch-aobo "He is eating lunch."

It can also refer to a habitual action, as in Ch-aocho yoguə' ža. "We eat every day." Or, to an incomplete action in the past, such as Ch-yiba'. "I was washing the clothes." It can also refer to an action that will continue at some time in the future, for example, Chexa šə ba-ch-əsə'ətase' catə' əžina' liža'aque'? "What will I do if they are already sleeping when I arrive at their house?" It is also used for the negation of any of the four circumstances already mentioned, as in the cases of Bito ch-le'ida'an. "I don't see him," or Bitoch ch-a'a scuel. "I am not going to the school now."

- Stative Aspect

In general, verbs in the stative aspect begin with the prefix n. However, some begin with other letters. In roots that begin with b, the stative morpheme is m. Stative verbs that indicate position begin with other letters, although there does not seem to be a pattern. Stative verbs describe the state of being of the person, place, animal, or thing that is being spoken about. Not every verb can be in the stative aspect. The following are examples of some stative verbs. N-one'en segur. "He has it hidden away." Ne'e m-ban bi'i nga catə' gata'. "When I die this boy will continue living." Yoguə' ža con chi' benə' golən'. "The elder spends all of his days seated."

- Completive Aspect

All of the verbs in the completive aspect begin with b, gw, g, or ʝ. However, not all of the verbs that begin with gw or g are in the completive aspect. The completive aspect indicates a finished action. Finished actions can be discussed in the continuative, stative, or completive aspects. When such actions are discussed in the continuative or stative aspects, the focus is on the duration of the action rather than its completion. In the completive aspect, the most important part is the fact that the action is now finished. The following are examples of verbs in the completive aspect. Note how it is difficult to see an underlying pattern among the verbs due to the high degree of allomorphy, seen in the following examples: Bseda'. "I studied." Gwatsbo'. "He slept." Bzoʝe. "He wrote." Ze'e gotəb. "(The animal) just died." Gwzoe' neʝe. "He was here(imperfect)."

- In the examples, it is worth noting that some of the verbs are in the simple past (preterite) tense, while others are in the imperfective aspect. However, in Zapotec languages, the continuative or stative aspects are used to convey the simple past.
- Potential Aspect

Normally, verbs in the potential aspect correspond to actions in the future; however, there are exceptions. The verbs don't begin with a common letter, rather the letter varies according to the type of verb. In this aspect, the verb expresses, hope, doubt, uncertainty, desire, or an unrealized action in the future, such as: Chene'ebo šeʝbo' tiend. "He wants to go to the shop." or Cheyalə' ye'eʝcho nis yoguə' ža. "We must drink water every day."

===== Secondary Aspect Markers =====
- Approximative Aspect
  - Many, but not all, verbs in Zapotec have the ability to denote approximation, or movement toward the speaker. All of the verbs in this aspect use the prefix -edə- inserted after the main aspect morpheme. The following table shows the approximative morpheme in each of the four primary aspects.

Continuative	Stative	Completive	Potential
ch-edə-	z-edə-	b-edə-	y-edə-
ch-edə-chogue'en	z-edə-chogue'en	b-edə-chogue'en	y-edə-chogue'en
He comes to cut it.	He has come to cut it.	He came to cut it.	He will come to cut it.

- Separative Aspect
  - The separative aspect indicates separation, or movement away from the speaker. This aspect is denoted with the morpheme -ʝ-. The separative aspect is not applicable to all verbs, but is applicable to the same set of verbs that can be put in the approximative aspect.

Continuative	Stative	Completive	Potential
ch-ʝ-	z-ʝ-	b-ʝ-	y-ʝ-
ch-ʝ-tasəb	z-ʝ-tasəb	b-ʝ-tasəb	y-ʝ-tasəb
(The animal) goes to sleep.	(The animal) has gone to sleep.	(The animal) went to sleep.	(The animal) will go to sleep.

- Frequentative Aspect
  - In general, the frequentative aspect indicates an action that is repeated several times. All of the verbs in the frequentative aspect use the letters e or o. The e is a very common frequentative aspect morpheme, while the o is rare. The e or o is found immediately after the primary aspect morpheme. A verb in the stative aspect cannot also be in the frequentative aspect.

Continuative	Completive	Potential
ch-e-	b-e-	y-e-
ch-e-žincho	b-e-žincho	y-e-žincho
We arrive again.	We are arriving again.	We will arrive again.

Continuative	Completive	Potential
ch-o-	b-o-	y-o-
ch-o-xonʰʝəb	b-o-xonʰʝəb	y-o-xonʰʝəb
(The animal) runs away again.	(The animal) ran away again.	(The animal) will run away again.

- Repetitive Aspect
  - When the speaker talks about something that has happened and wants to highlight the fact that the action has been repeated, he/she uses a verb in the frequentative aspect followed by a verb in the repetitive aspect. All of the verbs in the repetitive aspect use the morphemes -ez-, -oz-, or -os-. The choice of which morpheme to use is usually at the discretion of the speaker, although some verb roots have only one form in that aspect. When paired with the repetitive aspect, the continuative aspect morpheme is ch-, the completive aspect morpheme is g- or b-, and the potential aspect morpheme is y-

Continuative	Completive	Potential
ch-ez-/ch-oz-/ch-os-	b-ez-/b-oz-/b-ez-	y-ez-/y-oz-/y-os-
ch-ez-selə'əbo'on	b-os-selə'əbo'on	y-oz-xibo'on
He sends it again.	He sent it again.	He will clean it again.

==== Verb Roots that Begin with a Consonant ====
In all roots that begin with a consonant, the form of the root itself never changes in any aspect. In the table below, the verb chsedbo', "to study," is shown in its simple form and the approximation aspect:

	Continuative	Stative	Completive	Potential
Simple
3rd pers. sg	ch-sed-bo'	n-sed-bo'	b-sed-bo'	gw-sed-bo'
3rd pers. pl	chəsə'ə-sed-bo'	zʝən-sed-bo'	besə'ə-sed-bo'	yesə'ə-sed-bo'
Approximative
3rd pers. sg	chedə-sed-bo'	zedə-sed-bo'	bedə-sed-bo'	yedə-sed-bo'
3rd pers. pl	chedəsə'ə-sed-bo'	zedəsə'ə-sed-bo'	bedəsə'ə-sed-bo'	yedəsə'ə-sed-bo'

==== Verb Roots That Begin with a Vowel ====
The verbs with roots that begin with a vowel do not change except when used with the approximative, frequentative, and repetitive aspects. The verb chenebo', "to hear," is shown below:

	Continuative	Stative	Completive	Potential
Simple
3rd pers. sg	ch-ene-bo'	n-ene-bo'	b-ene-bo'	y-ene-bo'
3rd pers. pl	chse-ene-bo'	zʝən-ene-bo'	gwsə'ə-ene-bo'	se'-ene-bo'
Approximative
3rd pers. sg	che-yene-bo'	does not exist	be-yene-bo'	ye-yene-bo'
3rd pers. pl	chəsyə'ə-yene-bo'	does not exist	besyə'ə-yene-bo'	yesyə'ə-yene-bo'

==== Verb Roots that Begin with an Alternating Diphthong ====
- Verbs that begin with a diphthong start with a vowel followed by the saltillo, or glottal stop. The root undergoes change in the completive aspect in each person except for the third person plural. The roots begin with a and o in the continuative, stative, and potential, but begin with i in the completive. For example, "to buy," is ch-a'o-bo´ in the continuative and gü-i'o-bo´ in the completive.
- In the third person plural, the root is identical to the root in the continuative aspect.
- The approximative and separative aspects of "to buy" change the first vowel to the vowel from the simple form of the completive aspect, and the approximative adds the consonant y before the first vowel of the root. On the other hand, the verb "to load" keeps the same root as the simple form of the continuative in the secondary separative aspect and adds the y to the root of the simple form of the potential in the secondary separative aspect.

Cho'a-bo', "To load"

	Continuative	Stative	Completive	Potential
Simple
3rd pers. sg	ch-o'a-bo'	n-o'a-bo'	b-i'a-bo'	gu-a'a-bo'
3rd pers. pl	chs-o'a-bo'	zʝən-o'a-bo'	gws-o'a-bo'	s-o'a-bo'
Separative
3rd pers. sg	chʝ-oa'a-bo'	zʝ-oa'a-bo'	ʝ-oa'a-bo'	žʝ-oa'a-bo'
3rd pers. pl	chʝs-oa'a-bo'	zʝs-oa'a-bo'	ʝs-oa'a-bo'	žʝs-oa'a-bo'
Approximative
3rd pers. sg	chedə-ya'a-bo'	zedə-ya'a-bo'	bedə-ya'a-bo'	yedə-ya'a-bo'
3rd pers. sg	chedəsə'ə-ya'a-bo'	zedəsə'ə-ya'a-bo'	bedəsə'ə-ya'a-bo'	yedəsə'ə-ya'a-bo'

Cha'obo', "To buy"

	Continuative	Stative	Completive	Potential
Simple
3rd pers. sg	ch-a'o-bo'	n-a'o-bo'	gü-i'o-bo'	ga-a'o-bo'
3rd pers. pl	chs-a'o-bo'	zʝən-a'o-bo'	gws-a'o-bo'	s-o'a-bo'
Separative
3rd pers. sg	chʝ-i'o-bo'	zʝ-i'o-bo'	ʝ-i'o-bo'	žʝ-i'o-bo'
3rd pers. pl	chʝs-i'o-bo'	zʝs-i'o-bo'	ʝs-i'o-bo'	žʝs-i'o-bo'
Approximative
3rd pers. sg	chedə-i'o-bo'	zedə-i'o-bo'	bedə-i'o-bo'	yedə-i'o-bo'
3rd pers. sg	chedəsə'ə-yi'o-bo'	zedəsə'ə-yi'o-bo'	bedəsə'ə-yi'o-bo'	yedəsə'ə-yi'o-bo'

=== Adverbs ===
==== Adverbial Affixes ====
Adverbs of time are affixed to verbs. They are used with different aspects according to their meaning.

ba- "already"

- Used with verbs in the continuative, stative, and completive aspects.
  - Ba-chaobo'. "He is eating."

ze- "only", "have just", "not yet"

- Used to mean "only" in the continuative aspect, "have just" in the completive aspect, and "not yet" in the potential aspect.
  - Ze-chaobo' nʰa'a. "He's only eating now."
  - Ze-bebambo'. "(The child) has just woken up."
  - Ze-gaogüe. "He hasn't eaten yet."

nʰe "yet"

- Used with verbs in the continuative and stative aspects.
  - Nʰe-chaobo'. "He is still eating."

lʰe "later"

- Used with verbs in the continuative, completive, and potential aspects.
  - Lʰe-bebi'i-te-bo'. "Later it subsided."

== Syntax ==
=== Moods of the Verb ===
Grammatical mood is used to express modality, or the speaker's attitude toward whatever he/she is saying. In Yatzachi Zapotec, there are three moods: the indicative, which is used for factual statements, and also the imperative mood, used for commands, and the interrogative mood, used for questions.

==== Imperative Mood ====
There are three forms in the imperative: the singular, the plural, and the exhortative.

- The singular is used when a command is directed at one person. It has the same form as the simple form of the completive aspect in the indicative mood, but does not carry the inseparable pronoun.
  - gotə'əbo' , "He lay down," versus gotə' , "Lie down!"
- The plural form is directed at more than one person, and begins with the prefix lʰe-, or the word lʰe'e followed by the simple form of the potential aspect, without the inseparable pronoun.
  - gatə'əbo' , "Lay down (plural)!" versus lʰegatə' or lʰe'e gatə' .
- In addition to using the imperative mood to express orders, they can also be expressed using just the potential aspect of the indicative. This option is used just as frequently as the imperative mood. When the indicative form is used, it is accompanied by the inseparable pronoun.
  - Gono' de'e nga, "Do this!" or "You are going to do this!"

==== Negative Commands ====
Negative commands are expressed in the indicative mood instead of the imperative mood and are accompanied by bito, no.

- Bito gono xbabən' nac ca'. "Don't think like that."

Some negative commands are formed with the word cuidad, from the Spanish word cuidado, or "be careful," followed by a verb in the potential aspect, in the sense of "You're not going to..." or "Careful that you don't..."

- Cuidad ətaso', "Be careful not to fall asleep."
- Cuidad go'o dižə' chʰe de'en gwne', "You're not going to talk about what he told us."

==== Obligation ====
Another way to express obligation also uses verbs in the indicative instead of the imperative. It is similar to expressions "you have to" or "you must." In Zapotec, the word cheyalʰə' or "must" is used as an auxiliary without the inseparable pronoun, followed by a verb in the potential aspect with its own subject.

- Cheyalʰə' gone'en con can' goža'ane' "He has to do it just like I told him."

==== The Exhortative Mood ====
The exhortative form is rarely used. Nevertheless, it is considered part of the imperative mood. It is similar to other imperative forms in that it does not use the inseparable pronoun. This form consists of the letters lʰedo- or do- placed before the root of the verb in the secondary aspect of approximation and is equivalent to a command in the first person plural.

- Lʰedoyen žinnə', "Let's do the work!"

=== Voices of the verb ===
==== Active and passive voice ====
In English, phrases that have the subject as the agent are said to be in active voice, while verbs that have the subject as the patient are said to be in passive voice. As in English, the active voice in Zapotec is used much more often than the passive voice.

Voice	Continuative	Stative	Completive	Potential	Verb
Active	chotbo'on	notbo'on	betbo'on	gotbo'on	to cut (it)
Passive	chyetən	nyetən	byetən	əyetən	to be cut

Voice	Continuative	Stative	Completive	Potential	Verb
Active	chaobo'on	naobo'on	gwadaobo'on	gaobo'on	to eat (it)
Passive	chdaon	ndaon	gwdaon	ədaon	to be eaten

Note that the active voice names two participants in the action, indicated in the tables by the pronoun -bo', and the direct object, indicated by the pronoun -n. In the passive voice, there is only one participant, indicated by either the pronoun -ən or -n.

==== Causative and neutral voice ====
In Zapotec, most verbs, but not all, have a form that indicates that the action occurs because someone is causing it. In general, verbs in this form are treated as distinct from those that do not indicate who is causing the action. Nevertheless, it is useful to demonstrate the relationship between these two types of verbs. For this purpose, those which name the causer of the action are said to be in the causative voice, and those that do not name the causer are said to be in the neutral voice.

- Neutral voice: Chey yišen'. "The paper is burning."
- Causative voice: Chzey bida'onə' yišen'. "The boy is burning the paper."

The continuative root of this verb in the neutral voice begins with the vowel e, but in the causative voice, the root begins with the consonant z. Also, the verb in the neutral voice belongs to the conjugation of the aspect without an indicator, of the subgroup gw-, while the verb in the causative voice belongs to the conjugation gw-.

==== Causative voice indicated by a consonant change from weak to strong ====
The verbs of this group begin with a weak consonant in the simple form of the continuative aspect of the neutral voice. However, in the causative voice, the verbs begin with the corresponding strong consonant.

Weak	Strong
b	p
d	t
ch	chʰ
z	s
ž	š
x	xʰ
g	c
l	lʰ
n	nʰ
gw	cw

==== Causative voice in verbs with a vocalic root ====
Most verbs with roots beginning with a vowel have a consonant placed before the first vowel in all of the causative forms. Which consonant is used is determined by the vowel that begins the root.

Gu can be used for roots that begin with a, while gü is used for roots beginning with e and i and g is used for roots beginning with o in the neutral voice. The following examples show the shift from neutral to causative in the simple form of the continuative of the verb "to bathe."

- chazʝbo' > chguazʝbo'ob
- che'eʝbo' > chgüe'eʝbo'
- cholʰbo' > chgolʰbo'

In some verbs, the causative voice is indicated by the letter z before the vowel in the root, as in the verb "to hear".

- chenebo' > chzenebo'

Other verbs with vocalic roots form the causative voice when the first consonant of the root changes to another consonant, as in the verb "to paint".

- chbenən > chchembo'on

==== Causative voice indicated by the form of the frequentative or repetitive aspect ====
Some verbs use the same forms of the secondary frequentative or repetitive aspects to indicate the causative voice. Consequently, some of these verbs have a change in the root of the verb and the causative root is not the same as the neutral root.

- cheza'abo' > chosa'abo'one' "To leave again"

In the first group of this type, the frequentative has the vowel o. Some forms that contain an o use the frequentative aspect and others do not. Verbs in the other groups use the repetitive aspect form in the causative. Some verbs of this type also use the frequentative or repetitive forms in the neutral voice and others do not.

- chexin > choxibo'on "To erase"

=== Complements of the Verb ===
There are two types of complements: direct and indirect. Direct In Zapotec, the complement can be a noun, pronoun, or in third person, or incorporated as a suffix of the verb.

==== Direct Object ====
The direct object receives the action of the verb.

- Che'eʝ cabeyən' nis. "The horse is drinking water."
  - Here, "water" is the direct object.
- Beco' na'anə' gwadaob nada'. "That dog bit me."
  - "Me" is the direct object.
- Gwxʰe gonchon. "We are going to do it tomorrow."
  - In this case, the third person direct object pronoun "it" is represented by the suffix n.

==== Indirect Object ====
The indirect object represents the person or thing to which the action of the verb is directed. Transitive verbs can have both a direct and an indirect object, but they must have at least one of the two.

- Gwdixʝue' nada' ši pes. "He paid me ten pesos."
  - Here, "me" is the indirect object.
- Gwlo'icho-ne'e-n. "We are going to show it to him."
  - Here, "him" is the indirect object. Note the use of n to denote the direct object pronoun "it."

=== Reflexive Constructions ===
The reflexive construction in Zapotec uses only one pronoun to indicate the agent of the action and the patient at the same time. In these constructions, the verbs don't carry a subject affix, but they are followed by a type of pronoun that is only used in reflexive constructions to name the complement.

Person	Singular	Plural
First Person	cuina'	cuincho, (inclusive); cuinto', (exclusive)
Second Person	cuino'	ciunlʰe
Third Person	cuinga'aque', (respectful); cuinga'acbo', (familiar); cuinga'aquəb', (an); cuine, (in)	cuine', (respectful); cuimbo', (familiar); cuimb, (an); cuinga'aque, (in)

Bchʰechʰ cuina'. "(I) hit myself." Bida'onə' bchʰechʰ cuimbo'. "The child hit (himself)."

=== Reciprocal Constructions ===
The reciprocal constructions are somewhat similar to the reflexive constructions. They are also transitive, they don't use the subject affix, and they are followed by a pronoun that indicates a reciprocal action, or that two subjects are acting upon each other. Because of the dual subjects, the pronoun is always plural.

Person	Pronoun
First Person	lʝuežcho, (inclusive); lʝuežto', (exclusive)
Second Person	lʝuežʝle
Third Person	lʝuežʝe'/lʝuežʝga'aque', (respectful); lʝuežʝbo'/lʝuežʝga'abo', (familiar); lʝuežʝəb/lʝuežʝga'aquəb, (an); lʝuežʝe/lʝuežʝga'aque, (in)

Chbažə lʝuežʝe'. "They are hitting each other."

=== Questions ===
To ask a question in Zapotec, it is enough to put the indicator ə before the first word of the sentence or interrogative phrase. This question indicator is written as a capital letter E and is pronounced with the high tone.

- Emacy chʰio' de'e ngan'? "Is this your machine?"

If the first word of the phrase is not a verb, then the verb is in the indicative. However, if the first word is a verb, then sometimes the verb is in another form.

The question indicator can be placed in front of any word except for question words, which are the following:

No? "Who?"
Bi? "What?"
Ga? "Where?"
Bixchʰen? "Why?"
Nac? "How?"
Ja'aqueə?' "How much?"
Balʰə? "How many?"
Šna? or Šnei? "How much time?"

When a question begins with a verb, the verb is in the interrogative mood. In the interrogative mood, the simple forms of the continuative aspect are identical to their forms in the indicative, and the question indicator E [ə] is added to the beginning, but the simple forms of the completive and potential have another form, as in the following examples.

- Continuative: chtasbo' "He is sleeping." əchtasbo'? "Is he sleeping?"
- Potential: tasbo' "He is going to sleep." əgwtasbo? "Is he going to sleep?"
  - Note the use of gw in the potential.

The completive form of the interrogative begins with the consonant z.

- Ezono' žin nʰeža? "Did you work today?"
- Ezaobo'on? "Did he eat it?"

==== Responding to Questions ====
In Zapotec, to answer a question that begins with a verb, it is customary to repeat the verb. A positive answer (a "yes") contains the same form of the verb as the question. Negative answers, however, always use the indicative form of the verb.

=== Prepositions ===
Prepositions in Zapotec, like in other languages, link principal words with their complements, with the complement being subordinate to the principal word or phrase. Prepositions of place in Zapotec are formed from the words for parts of the human body, but in these cases have the true function of prepositions.

The following are the prepositions of place in Yatzachi Zapotec:

lao (face of) "on top of, on, to, before, of"
cho'a (mouth of) "to, on, in front of, on the bank of"
cožə (back of) "behind, to the other side of"
yichʰʝ (head of) "above, on the top part of"
xni'a (foot of) "at the foot of, on the bottom part of, under the authority of"
xan (buttocks of) "under, beneath, behind, in the depths of"
lʰe'e (belly of) "on, top of"
cuit (ribcage of) "next to"
cho'alao (mouth-face of) "around, near"

== See also ==
- San Baltazar Yatzachi el Bajo
