= Zapoteco serrano, del sureste medio =

Zapoteco serrano, del sureste medio is a name used by INALI for a variety of Zapotec recognized by the Mexican government. It corresponds to two ISO languages:

- Yatzachi Zapotec (ISO 639-3: zav)
- Zoogocho Zapotec (ISO 639-3: zpq)

== See also ==
- Zapoteco
