= Yásnaya Aguilar =

Mixe writer, linguist, translator and activist (born 1981)

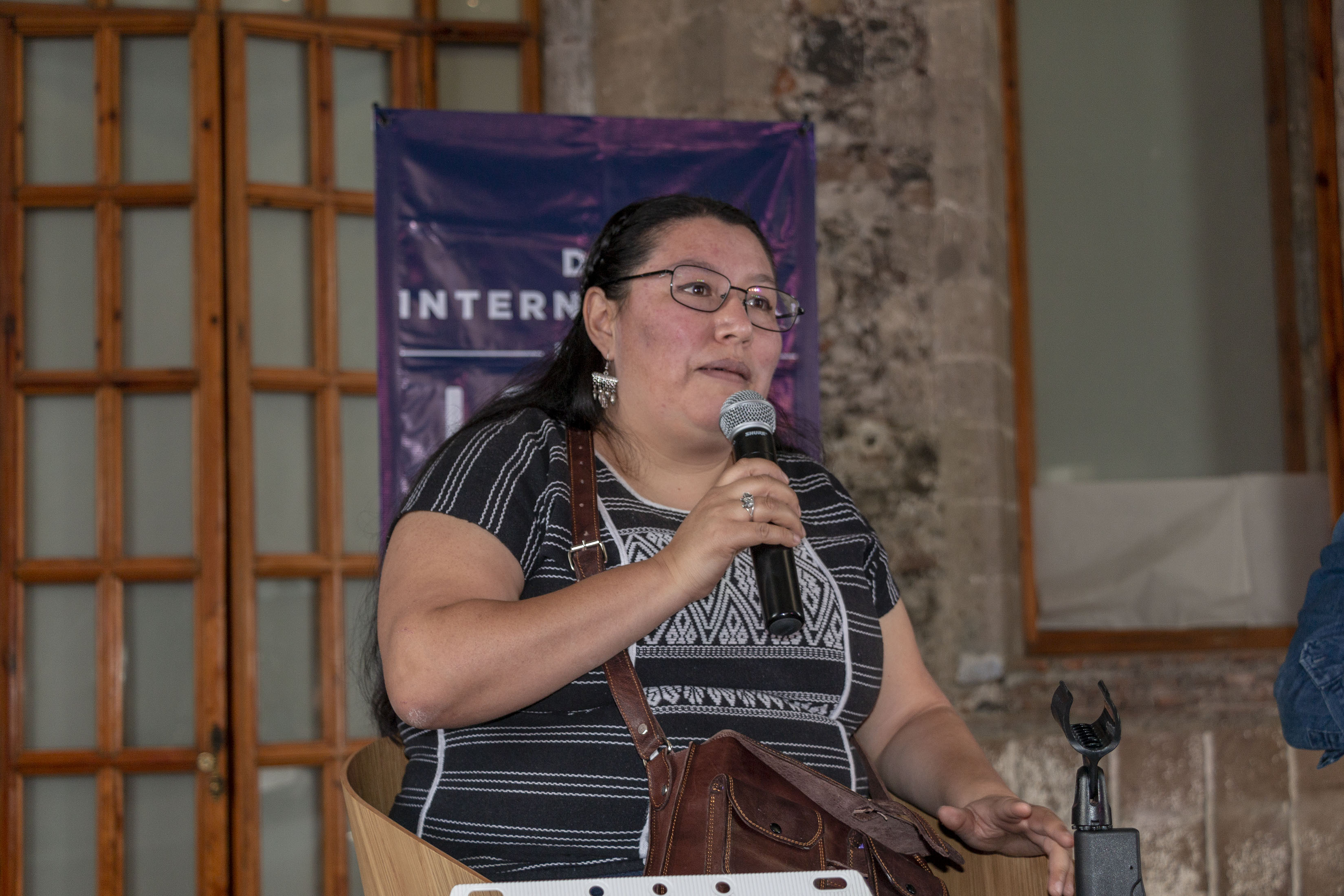
- Yásnaya Aguilar in 2019
- Born: Ayutla Mixe (San Pedro y San Pablo Ayutla)
- Occupation: Linguist

Academic background
- Education: UNAM

Yásnaya Elena Aguilar Gil (Ayutla Mixe, Oaxaca, 16 October 1981) is a Mixe writer, linguist, translator and linguistic rights activist. She works and publishes in Ayuujk (mixe), Castilian (Spanish) and English.

== Biography ==
Aguilar Gil earned a degree in Hispanic Language and Literatures at the National Autonomous University of Mexico (UNAM), completing in 2004 a thesis on the diachrony of constituent order in Spanish. She later pursued a master’s degree in Hispanic Linguistics at UNAM, where she developed a strong interest in language studies and began researching the grammar of her mother tongue, the Southern Upper Mixe (Ayuujk). Aguilar Gil is a notable linguistic rights advocate, addressing the systemic neglect of "indigenous languages" and the historical marginalization of their speakers.

== Career and activism ==
Since 2011, Aguilar Gil has contributed to the magazine Este País and authored the blog Ayuujk, discussing language policy and the marginalization of indigenous language speakers in Mexico. She has participated in numerous conferences, workshops, and lectures nationally and internationally, including an invitation in 2018 by the Indigenous Governing Council to speak in Zapatista territory in the presence of Subcomandante Marcos. She was coordinator of Culture and Events at the Biblioteca de Investigación Juan de Córdova in Oaxaca and is a member of the COLMIX (Colectivo Mixe, an interdisciplinary, intercommunity network dedicated to research, outreach, and education on the Mixe people and cultures). She has been a regular writer in El País since 2020.

Aguilar Gil's linguistic activism addresses the systemic neglect of indigenous languages and the historical marginalization of their speakers. She has highlighted the social, political, and economic factors contributing to the endangerment of languages like Ayuujk, emphasizing that preserving these languages is crucial not only linguistically but also for indigenous rights. As an activist, "she has defended the linguistic rights of speakers of indigenous languages, and promoted their use online and in literary translation."

She has also spoken about the challenges of translation between indigenous and major world languages, especially for legal and literary texts. In 2019, she delivered a speech in Mixe at the Mexican Chamber of Deputies during the International Year of Indigenous Languages, stating: “Our languages are not dying, they are being killed.”

Aguilar Gil also advocates on environmental issues, particularly water scarcity, and has co-hosted the documentary series El tema with Gael García Bernal. She has also publicly denounced attacks on her community of Ayutla Mixe related to land and water disputes, emphasizing the long-standing lack of potable water.

== Selected works ==
- Un nosotrxs sin Estado (2018); Nous sans l'État (translated into French, 2022)
- Ää: manifiestos sobre la diversidad lingüística (2020)
- La sangre, la lengua y el apellido (2021)
