= Santiago Atitlán, Oaxaca =

Santiago Atitlán
- Municipality and town
- Location in Mexico
- Coordinates: 17°6′N 95°57′W
- Country: Mexico
- State: Oaxaca

Area
  - Total: 82.93 km^{2} (32.02 sq mi)
- Elevation: 1,520 m (4,990 ft)
- Time zone: UTC-6 (Central Standard Time)

Santiago Atitlán is a town and municipality in Oaxaca in south-western Mexico. It is part of the Sierra Mixe district within the Sierra Norte de Oaxaca Region.

== Environment ==
The municipality covers wooded and mountainous area of 82.93 km^{2}. The forests contain oak, mahogany, white cedar and red cedar, among others. Fruit trees include orange, lime, apple, peach, banana, sapodilla, mamey, pineapple, guava, plum, papaya, (Note: The source includes "payua" in the list of fruits. This is almost certainly a misprint for "papaya".) avocado and mango. Wild animals include cat, wild boar, tapir, brocket deer, deer, tepexcuincle, coyote, wolf, bobcat and fox.

== People ==
As of 2005, the municipality had 679 households with a total population of 3,187 of which 2.790 spoke an indigenous language. The main economic activity is cultivation of coffee. Other crops are corn, beans, peppers and tomatoes. The Union of Indigenous Communities of the Isthmus Region, a cooperative founded in 1982, assists in production and distribution of the local products, notably coffee, under a fair trade label.
