= Martyrs of Cajonos =

Mexican Catholics

Blesseds Juan Bautista Jacinto de los Ángeles

Laymen; Martyrs
- Born: c. 1660; San Francisco Cajonos, Oaxaca, Mexico
- Died: 16 September 1700 (aged 40); San Francisco Cajonos, Oaxaca, Mexico
- Venerated in: Catholic Church
- Beatified: 1 August 2002, Basilica of Our Lady of Guadalupe, Mexico City, Mexico by Pope John Paul II
- Feast: 18 September
- Patronage: San Francisco Cajonos

Juan Bautista and Jacinto de los Ángeles (c. 1660 – 16 September 1700) were Mexican Catholics. The pair were both instructed to protect moral practices in their town and to ensure that the faith was safeguarded in the face of pagan and tribal beliefs and practices. But this put them into conflict with some locals who decided to hunt them down and kill them after the pair interrupted a ritual and confiscated their possessions. The two men were slain after being captured in a local Dominican convent and after having professed their faith to their attackers.

Both men were venerated long after their murders and a beatification cause was introduced. It later remained dormant for sometime due to a lack of interest but was reignited during the late 1980s and into the 1990s when the formal process was launched. The two were beatified on 1 August 2002 in Mexico on the occasion that Pope John Paul II visited the nation.

== Lives ==
=== Backgrounds ===
Juan Bautista was born circa 1660. He married Josefa de la Cruz and the pair had a daughter named Rosa. Jacinto de los Ángeles was born circa 1660. He was married to Petrona and the couple together had two children named Juan and Nicolasa. He was descended from a line of important tribal chiefs.

Both Juan Bautista and Jacinto de Los Ángeles - who were both born in San Francisco Cajonos - were Zapotec Indians and were catechists.

=== Life and murder ===
Both Juan and Jacinto were altar servers in their childhood and often aided their local parish priest in duties. The two later secured jobs that would see them work to ensure the protection of moral practices and to safeguard the faith in their town of San Francisco Cajonos.

On 14 September 1700 the pair learnt that there would be a ritual for idols in the evening to be held at the home of the local Indio José Flores. The two alerted the Dominicans and it was agreed that both Juan and Jacinto would intervene. The two went to Flores' home and managed to enter without being seen though their presence came as a great surprise to all those present since Juan and Jacinto were well known in their town. Juan and Jacinto - as well as the now-arrived Dominicans - began reproving those present to which the Indios blew out their candles and ran out of Flores' house covering their faces. The idolater's items were all confiscated and taken to the Dominican convent.

During the morning on 15 September the Dominican provincial-superior for the Oaxaca region was informed of what had transpired the night before. But Juan and Jacinto learned at around noon that the idolaters were preparing to retaliate which prompted both men to flee to the convent to hide. But the Indio mob learnt of this and around 8:00pm burst into the convent with clubs and spears and with their faces and feet covered so as not to be identified. The mob ordered the priests to hand over Juan and Jacinto lest all others in the convent be killed. But the priests Gaspar and Alonzo refused which prompted the mob to threaten burning down the church. Members of the mob then broke one of the doors leading to their confiscated possessions all the while setting fire to Juan's home which was not too far from the convent.

Both men realized that remaining hidden meant the senseless deaths of all those in the convent so stepped forward to face the mob. Jacinto asked the priest to hear his confession and to give him Communion before leaving with the mob since he desired to "die for love of God and without using weapons". The two were whipped out of the convent with one of the men asking the priests: "Fathers - commend us to God!" Juan and Jacinto were beaten and tortured as the mob attempted to persuade them to abjure their faith. Both were defiant and continued to profess their faith. The mob took the men for further torture and during the morning on 16 September moved them to San Pedro village to be taken to the Tanga Hill.

That afternoon both Juan and Jacinto were thrown down the hill before being beaten with clubs and cut down with machetes. Their chests were cut open and their hearts removed to be given to the dogs. Their remains were thrown into an open pit but later recovered and preserved in the church at Villa Alta. But in 1889 their remains were given to the Archbishop of Antequera de Oaxaca who moved them into the archdiocesan cathedral.

== Beatification ==
The beatification process had not been initiated until several preliminaries were launched in the 1970s and the 1980s to assess if evidence existed to support a formal canonization process. But it remained dormant until 25 January 1991 when the Congregation for the Causes of Saints issued the "nihil obstat" (no objections) edict and titled Juan and Jacinto as Servants of God. The diocesan process of investigation was inaugurated a month later on 21 February and closed months later that 12 December before the C.C.S. validated the process in Rome on 20 November 1992. The cause's leading officials (the postulation) compiled and submitted a Positio dossier to the C.C.S. for evaluation in 1999 before a board of historians approved it that 7 December. Theologians confirmed on 22 May 2001 that the two men were murdered "in odium fidei" (in hatred of the faith) which was a verdict that the C.C.S. also accepted in their meeting on 11 June. Pope John Paul II approved the cause (and their beatification) on 7 July.

John Paul II beatified the two men on 1 August 2002 during his apostolic visit to Mexico; those Mexican immigrants from Oaxaca living in Los Angeles attended the beatification.
