= Santo Domingo Tepuxtepec =

Coordinates: 16.95°N 96.05°W

- Municipality and town
- Interactive map of Santo Domingo Tepuxtepec
- Country: Mexico
- State: Oaxaca
- Time zone: UTC-6 (Central Standard Time)

Santo Domingo Tepuxtepec is a town and municipality in Oaxaca in south-western Mexico. The municipality covers an area of km^{2}. It is part of the Sierra Mixe district within the Sierra Norte de Oaxaca Region.

As of 2015, the municipality had a total population of 4,815 inhabitants.
