= San Mateo Cajonos =

- Municipality and town
- Location in Mexico
- Coordinates: 17°09′N 96°12′W
- Country: Mexico
- State: Oaxaca

Area
  - Total: 25.52 km^{2} (9.85 sq mi)

Population (2005)
  - Total: 574
- Time zone: UTC-6 (Central Standard Time)

San Mateo Cajonos is a town and municipality in Oaxaca in south-western Mexico. The municipality covers an area of 25.52 km^{2}. It is part of the Villa Alta District in the center of the Sierra Norte Region.

As of 2005, the municipality had a total population of 574.
