= Villa Alta District =

- District
- Oaxaca regions and districts: Sierra Norte to Northeast
- Coordinates: 17°20′N 96°9′W
- Country: Mexico
- State: Oaxaca

Area
  - Total: 1,177 km^{2} (454 sq mi)

Population (2020)
  - Total: 30,568

Villa Alta District is located in the center of the Sierra Norte Region of the State of Oaxaca, Mexico. It has an area of 1,156 km^{2} of mountainous country, divided into 25 municipalities.

As of 2007 there were 99 settlements of which 72 had electricity and 38 had a supply of potable water in 2007. As of 2020 the total population was 30,568. The main food crops are maize and beans. Coffee is the most important cash crop, and there is some sugar cane production.

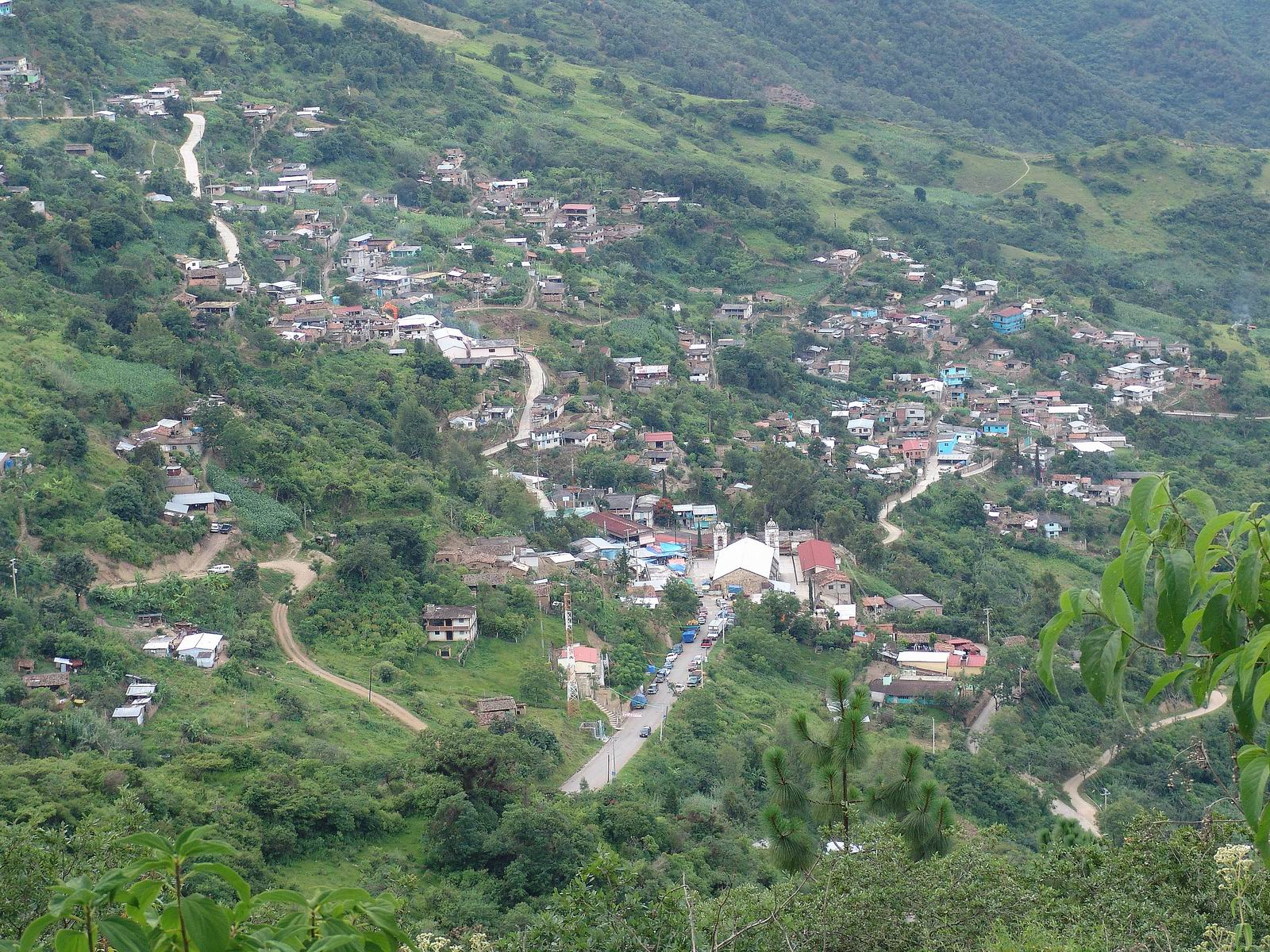
San Bartolomé Zoogocho

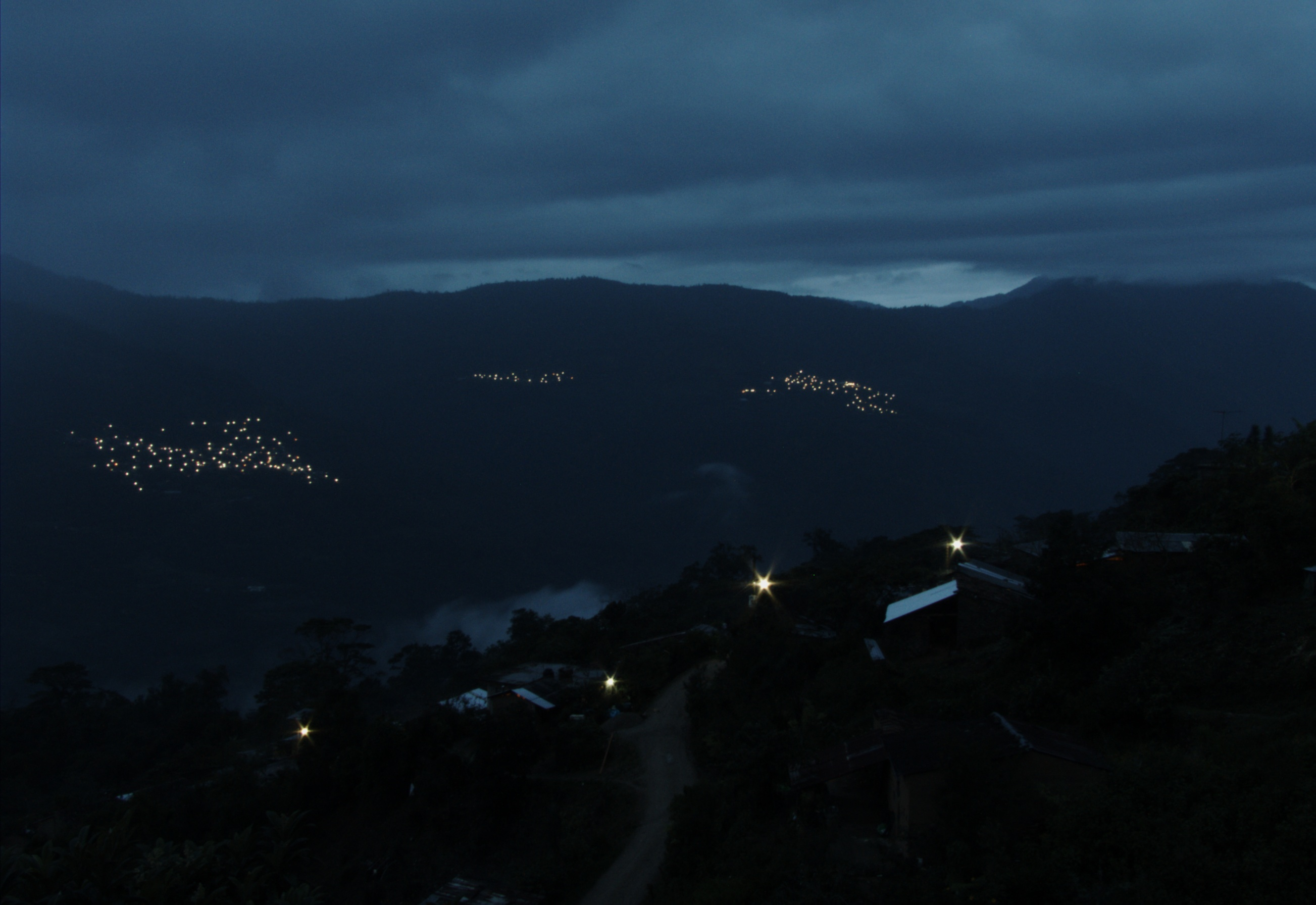
From left to right: Tanetze de Zaragoza, San Isidro Reforma, Juquila Vijanos, Santo Domingo Cacalotepec

== Municipalities ==
Villa Alta municipalities

The district includes the following municipalities:

Municipality code	Name	Population		Land Area			Population density	
Municipality code	Name	2020	Rank	km^{2}	sq mi	Rank	2020	Rank
097	San Andrés Solaga	1,771	6	48.63	18.78	8	36/km^{2} (94/sq mi)	11
100	San Andrés Yaá	393	24	40.94	15.81	11	10/km^{2} (25/sq mi)	24
114	San Baltazar Yatzachi el Bajo	674	17	30.33	11.71	15	22/km^{2} (58/sq mi)	18
120	San Bartolomé Zoogocho	449	20	8.741	3.375	23	51/km^{2} (133/sq mi)	7
128	San Cristóbal Lachirioag	1,342	9	16.86	6.51	20	80/km^{2} (206/sq mi)	2
138	San Francisco Cajonos	451	19	44.66	17.24	10	10/km^{2} (26/sq mi)	23
156	San Ildefonso Villa Alta	3,677	1	93.94	36.27	2	39/km^{2} (101/sq mi)	9
201	San Juan Juquila Vijanos	1,880	5	56.55	21.83	5	33/km^{2} (33/km^{2})	14
216	San Juan Tabaá	1,241	10	19.61	7.57	19	63/km^{2} (164/sq mi)	5
222	San Juan Yaeé	1,426	8	37.82	14.60	12	38/km^{2} (98/sq mi)	10
223	San Juan Yatzona	440	21	29.11	11.24	16	15/km^{2} (39/sq mi)	21
246	San Mateo Cajonos	611	18	14.69	5.67	21	42/km^{2} (108/sq mi)	8
257	San Melchor Betaza	1,052	14	34.09	13.16	14	31/km^{2} (80/sq mi)	17
299	San Pablo Yaganiza	1,125	12	35.43	13.68	13	32/km^{2} (82/sq mi)	16
303	San Pedro Cajonos	1,081	13	2.814	1.086	25	384/km^{2} (995/sq mi)	1
432	Santa María Temaxcalapa	903	16	13.19	5.09	22	68/km^{2} (177/sq mi)	4
442	Santa María Yalina	250	25	48.25	18.63	9	5/km^{2} (13/sq mi)	25
457	Santiago Camotlán	3,346	2	312.1	120.5	1	11/km^{2} (28/sq mi)	22
471	Santiago Lalopa	431	22	25.61	9.89	17	17/km^{2} (44/sq mi)	20
503	Santiago Zoochila	425	23	8.213	3.171	24	52/km^{2} (134/sq mi)	6
514	Santo Domingo Roayaga	941	15	56.25	21.72	7	17/km^{2} (43/sq mi)	24
522	Santo Domingo Xagacía	1,205	11	56.45	21.80	6	21/km^{2} (55/sq mi)	19
541	Tanetze de Zaragoza	1,558	7	22.47	8.68	18	69/km^{2} (180/sq mi)	3
038	Villa Hidalgo Yalálag	1,885	4	58.98	22.77	4	32/km^{2} (83/sq mi)	15
280	Villa Talea de Castro	2,011	3	61.07	23.58	3	33/km^{2} (85/sq mi)	13
	Distrito Villa Alta	30,568	—	1,177	454.44	—	26/km^{2} (67/sq mi)	—
Source: INEGI

=== Largest cities ===
Largest cities or towns in Villa Alta Distric Source:
Rank		Municipality	Pop.
1	Villa Hidalgo Yalalag	Villa Hidalgo Yalalag	1,752
2	Villa Talea de Castro	Villa Talea de Castro	1,499
3	San Ildefonso Villa Alta	San Ildefonso Villa Alta	1,442
4	San Cristóbal Lachirioag	San Cristóbal Lachirioag	1,342
5	San Juan Tabaá	San Juan Tabaá	1,233
6	San Pablo Yaganiza	San Pablo Yaganiza	1,125
7	San Pedro Cajonos	San Pedro Cajonos	1,081
8	Santo Domingo Xagacía	Santo Domingo Xagacía	1,025
9	Tanetze de Zaragoza	Tanetze de Zaragoza	953
10	Santa María Temaxcalapa	Santa María Temaxcalapa	903
