= San Juan Cotzocón =

- Municipality and town
- Location in Mexico
- Coordinates: 17°10′N 95°47′W
- Country: Mexico
- State: Oaxaca

Area
  - Total: 945.4 km^{2} (365.0 sq mi)

Population (2005)
  - Total: 22,478
- Time zone: UTC-6 (Central Standard Time)

San Juan Cotzocon is a town and municipality in Oaxaca in south-western Mexico. It is part of the Sierra Mixe district within the Sierra Norte de Oaxaca Region.

== Name ==
The name "Cotzocón" or "Cozogón" means "Dark Mountain".

== Geography ==
The municipality covers an area of 945.4 km^{2}. The territory is rugged, with grazing and cultivation of coffee and corn practiced only the lower irregular plains. The Chiquito River runs through the northern part, a tributary of the Rio Grande. The climate is warm and humid, with rain almost all year round. The forested areas contain pine, cedar, and ceiba.

== Population ==
As of 2005, the municipality had 5,030 households with a total population of 22,478 of whom 10,712 spoke an indigenous language. The main town is now María Lombardo de Caso, located at a height of 140 meters above sea level. Although in a Mixe area, many of the people in this town are Mazatec or Chinantec who moved here after being displaced by the Miguel Alemán Dam in the 1960s. In the 1950s the remote municipality, accessible only via dirt track, drew visitors from the USA investigating use of hallucinogenic psilocybin mushrooms in the traditional Mixe ceremonies.

== Economy ==
The main economic activity is coffee cultivation, followed by livestock raising. Some of the Mixe women of the village of San Juan Cotzocon use back strap looms to weave traditional huipil, rebosos, napkins, table cloths and other textile crafts. The Union of Indigenous Communities of the Isthmus Region, a cooperative founded in 1982, assists in production and distribution of the local products, notably coffee, under a fair trade label.
