= San Lucas Camotlán =

- Municipality and town
- Location in Mexico
- Coordinates: 16°57′N 95°43′W
- Country: Mexico
- State: Oaxaca

Area
  - Total: 127.58 km^{2} (49.26 sq mi)

Population (2005)
  - Total: 2,524
- Time zone: UTC-6 (Central Standard Time)

San Lucas Camotlán is a town and municipality in Oaxaca in south-western Mexico. The municipality covers an area of 127.58 km^{2}. It is part of the Sierra Mixe district within the Sierra Norte de Oaxaca Region.

== Population ==
As of 2005, the municipality had 518 households with a total population of 2,524 of whom 2,168 spoke an indigenous language. About 90% of the population is engaged in agriculture, and 10% in animal husbandry. The Union of Indigenous Communities of the Isthmus Region, a cooperative founded in 1982, assists in production and distribution of the local products, notably coffee, under a fair trade label.
