= Santo Domingo Xagacía =

Coordinates: 17°10′N 96°16′W

- Municipality and town
- Interactive map of Santo Domingo Xagacía
- Country: Mexico
- State: Oaxaca

Population (2005)
  - Total: 1,000
- Time zone: UTC-6 (Central Standard Time)

Santo Domingo Xagacía is a town and municipality in Oaxaca in south-western Mexico. It is part of the Villa Alta District in the center of the Sierra Norte Region.

In 2004, the municipality had a total population of approx. 1,000.
