= San Baltazar Yatzachi el Bajo =

- Municipality and town
- Location in Oaxaca, Mexico
- Coordinates: 17°13′N 96°13′W
- Country: Mexico
- State: Oaxaca

Area
  - Total: 48.48 km^{2} (18.72 sq mi)

Population (2010)
  - Total: About 50−80
- Time zone: UTC-6 (Central Standard Time)

San Baltazar Yatzachi el Bajo is a town and municipality in Oaxaca in south-western Mexico. The municipality covers an area of 48.48 km^{2}. This small town is located in the valley on the side of a mountain. This mountain is connected to Yatzachi el Alto. It is part of the Villa Alta District in the center of the Sierra Norte Region.

As of 2010, the municipality had a total population of about 50–80.

== See also ==
- Yatzachi Zapotec
