= San Melchor Betaza =

- Municipality and town
- Location in Mexico
- Coordinates: 17°15′N 96°09′W
- Country: Mexico
- State: Oaxaca

Area
  - Total: 37 km^{2} (14 sq mi)

Population (2005)
  - Total: 919
- Time zone: UTC-6 (Central Standard Time)

San Melchor Betaza is a town and municipality in Oaxaca in south-western Mexico. The municipality covers an area of 37 km^{2}. It is part of the Villa Alta District in the center of the Sierra Norte Region.

As of 2005, the municipality had a total population of 919. The inhabitants, who speak Zapotec.
