= San Pablo Yaganiza =

- Municipality and town
- Location in Mexico
- Coordinates: 17°08′N 96°14′W
- Country: Mexico
- State: Oaxaca
- Time zone: UTC-6 (Central Standard Time)

San Pablo Yaganiza is a town and municipality in Oaxaca in south-western Mexico. The municipality covers an area of km^{2}. It is part of the Villa Alta District in the center of the Sierra Norte Region.

As of 2005, the municipality had a total population of .
