= San Cristóbal Lachirioag =

San Cristóbal Lachirioag Lashichhiaj (llanos de piedras) en zapotec
- Municipality and town
- Location in Mexico
- Coordinates: 17°20′N 96°10′W
- Country: Mexico
- State: Oaxaca

Area
  - Total: 24.24 km^{2} (9.36 sq mi)

Population (2005)
  - Total: 1,130
- Time zone: UTC-6 (Central Standard Time)

San Cristóbal Lachirioag (/lɑːʃɪˈtʃjɑːɡ/, alternatively /lɑːʃɪˈdʒjɑːɡ/) is a town and municipality in Oaxaca in south-western Mexico. The municipality covers an area of 24.24 km^{2}. Many community members speak a local Villa Alta Zapotec language as a first language and Spanish as a second language. This community is an agricultural and spiritual one. There are many sacred parts in Lashichhiaj but the main one is Yawis which is the sacred Mountain where we pray for protection and healing. Elders tell stories passed down to them that in the sacred mountain Yawis was a flying animal bigger than an eagle that would pick people up and take them to the mountain and never seen again. It is part of the Villa Alta District in the center of the Sierra Norte Region.

As of 2005, the municipality had a total population of 1,130.
