= Santiago Zacatepec =

Santiago Zacatepec, Oaxaca
- Municipality and town
- Location in Mexico
- Coordinates: 17°9′N 95°55′W
- Country: Mexico
- State: Oaxaca

Area
  - Municipality and town: 142.89 km^{2} (55.17 sq mi)
- Elevation: 1,200 m (3,900 ft)

Population (2005)
  - Urban: 4,871
- Time zone: UTC-6 (Central Standard Time)

Santiago Zacatepec is a town and municipality in Oaxaca in south-western Mexico. It is part of the Sierra Mixe district within the Sierra Norte de Oaxaca Region. The Spanish municipality was founded around 1520.

== Geography ==
The municipality covers an area of 142.89 km^{2} of mountainous and wooded terrain. The town is at an elevation of 1,200 above sea level. The climate is mild with most rain between from June and January.

=== Flora and fauna ===
Flora include oak, cedar, sapodilla, mahogany and chokecherry. Wild fauna include deer, skunk, rabbit, squirrel, badger, wild boar, wild cat, mountain lion, mole, mountain lion, monkey, armadillo, fox, raccoon and opossum.

== Demography ==
As of 2005, the municipality had 1,106 households with a total population of 4,871 of whom 4,378 people spoke an indigenous language. Most of the people are engaged in agriculture, growing corn, beans and fruits. There is some production of mezcal.
