= San Pedro Cajonos =

- Municipality
- Location in Mexico
- Coordinates: 17°10′N 96°17′W
- Country: Mexico
- State: Oaxaca
- Time zone: UTC-6 (Central Standard Time)

San Pedro Cajonos is a town and municipality in Oaxaca in southeastern Mexico, being the fourth smallest municipality in Oaxaca, but is still bigger than Santa Inés Yatzeche, Santa Cruz Amilpas, and Natividad. The municipality covers an area of km^{2}. It is part of the Villa Alta District in the center of the Sierra Norte Region. It was founded on September 16, 1700 and given the name of San Pedro Cajonos. The language spoken in the town is a mix of Spanish and a lesser amount of spoken indigenous language called Cajonos Zapotec.

As of March 2020, the municipality had a total population of 1,081.
