= San Juan Yatzona =

- Municipality and town
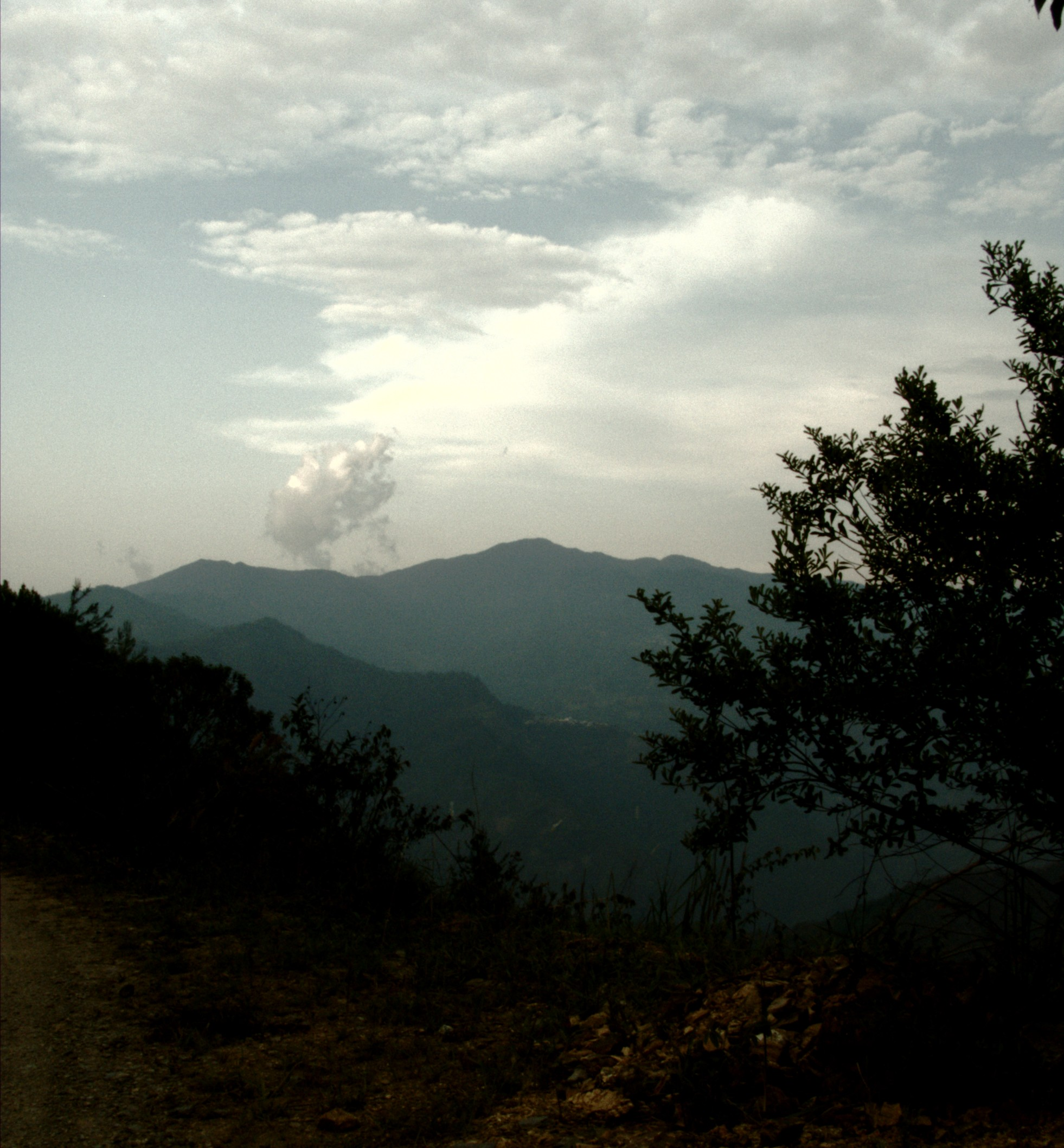

- Location in Mexico
- Coordinates: 17°24′N 96°10′W
- Country: Mexico
- State: Oaxaca

Area
  - Total: 38.27 km^{2} (14.78 sq mi)

Population (2005)
  - Total: 561
- Time zone: UTC-6 (Central Standard Time)

San Juan Yatzona is a town and municipality in Oaxaca in south-western Mexico. The municipality covers an area of 38.27 km^{2}. It is part of the Villa Alta District in the center of the Sierra Norte Region.

As of 2005, the municipality had a total population of 561.
