= San Andrés Yaá =

- Municipality and town
- Location in Mexico
- Coordinates: 17°18′N 96°09′W
- Country: Mexico
- State: Oaxaca

Area
  - Total: 33.17 km^{2} (12.81 sq mi)

Population (2005)
  - Total: 378
- Time zone: UTC-6 (Central Standard Time)

San Andrés Yaá is a town and municipality in Oaxaca in south-western Mexico. The municipality covers an area of 33.17 km^{2}. It is part of the Villa Alta District in the center of the Sierra Norte Region.

As of 2005, the municipality had a total population of 378.
