= Villa Talea de Castro =

- Municipality and town
- Location in Mexico
- Coordinates: 17.15°N 96.2333°W
- Country: Mexico
- State: Oaxaca
- Time zone: UTC-6 (Central Standard Time)

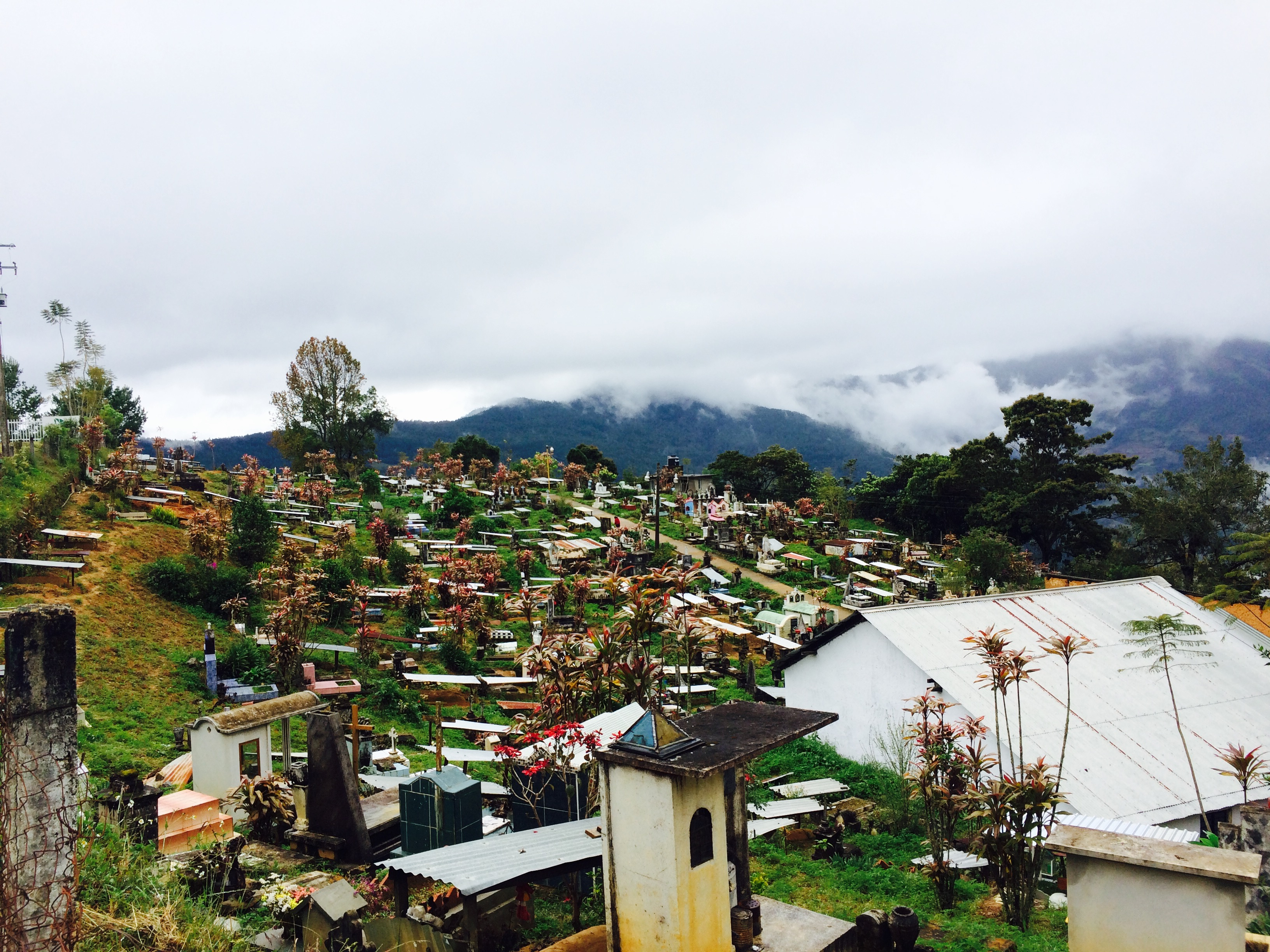
Villa Talea de Castro in winter

Villa Talea de Castro is a town and municipality in Oaxaca in south-western Mexico. It is part of the Villa Alta District in the center of the Sierra Norte Region.

As of 2013, the municipality had a population of 2,500.
