= Tamazulapam del Espíritu Santo =

- municipality and town
- Interactive map of Tamazulapam del Espíritu Santo
- Coordinates: 17°3′N 96°4′W
- Country: Mexico
- State: Oaxaca
- Time zone: UTC-6 (Central Standard Time)
- Postal code: 951
- Area code: 70280

Tamazulapam del Espíritu Santo is a town and municipality in Oaxaca in south-western Mexico. The municipality is at an altitude of 2,040 meters. It is part of the Sierra Mixe district within the Sierra Norte de Oaxaca Region.

The municipality has a total population of 6,908, and the town has a population of 2,372.

Municipal President Artemio Ortiz Ricardez died on May 13, 2020 during the COVID-19 pandemic in Mexico. The town had been placed under quarantine after its first reported case on May 10.
