= Santa María Tlahuitoltepec =

- Municipality and town
- Location in Oaxaca Santa María Tlahuitoltepec (Mexico)
- Coordinates: 17°06′N 96°04′W
- Country: Mexico
- State: Oaxaca
- Time zone: UTC-6 (Central Standard Time)

Santa María Tlahuitoltepec is a town and municipality in Oaxaca in south-western Mexico. It is part of the Sierra Mixe district within the Sierra Norte de Oaxaca Region.

== 2010 landslide ==
Tropical Storm Matthew struck the town in 2010.
