= San Miguel Quetzaltepec =

- Municipality and town
- Location in Mexico
- Coordinates: 16°58′N 95°49′W
- Country: Mexico
- State: Oaxaca

Area
  - Total: 199.03 km^{2} (76.85 sq mi)

Population (2005)
  - Total: 6,015
- Time zone: UTC-6 (Central Standard Time)

San Miguel Quetzaltepec is a town and municipality in Oaxaca in south-western Mexico. It is part of the Sierra Mixe district within the Sierra Norte de Oaxaca Region.

== Name ==
The name "Quetzaltepec" means "hill of the quetzal", a tiny bird with a large red and green tail that is now rare in the area.

== Geography ==
The municipality covers an area of 199.03 km^{2} at an altitude of 1,200 meters above sea level. The average temperature is 20 °C. Rainfall is variable.

=== Flora and fauna ===
Trees include pitch pine, cedar and oaks. Fruits are mango, oranges, limes, lemons, pineapple, mamey, guava, bananas, sugar cane, custard apple, sapodilla plum, mountain grape, avocado, cuajinicuil, chayote and peaches. Wild animals include fox, wild cat, wild boar, armadillo, squirrel and deer.

== Demography ==
As of 2005, the municipality had 1,419 households with a total population of 6,015 of whom of 5,428 people spoke an indigenous language.

== Economy ==
The main economic activity is coffee cultivation, with small-scale production of other crops and some animal husbandry. Timber is logged for use in construction of local houses. The Union of Indigenous Communities of the Isthmus Region, a cooperative founded in 1982, assists in production and distribution of the local products, notably coffee, under a fair trade label.

== History ==
In June 2003 a group of indigenous activists tried to seize the town hall, triggering in which three people died and ten were wounded. The group claimed that the local government was stealing public funds. In February 2006 the town of San Juan Bosco Chuxnaban, which is in the municipality, was invaded by over 60 heavily armed state judicial police who used tear gas and gunfire during their arrest of three residents. The detainees were apparently Zapatista supporters opposed to the Institutional Revolutionary Party.
