= San Carlos Yautepec =

- Municipality and town
- Location of the municipality in Oaxaca

- Location in Mexico
- Coordinates: 16°30′N 96°06′W
- Country: Mexico
- State: Oaxaca

Area
  - Total: 2,491.68 km^{2} (962.04 sq mi)

Population (2005)
  - Total: 9,857
- Time zone: UTC-6 (Central Standard Time)

San Carlos Yautepec is a town and municipality in Oaxaca in southeastern Mexico and is the second largest municipality in Oaxaca, only being smaller than Santa María Chimalapa. It is part of the Yautepec District in the east of the Sierra Sur Region. The name "Yautepec" means "hill of black corn".

== Geography ==
The municipality covers an area of 2491.68 km^{2} at an altitude of 880 meters above sea level. The climate is hot and humid. Trees include pine, guanacastle and oak, with fruit-bearing trees such as mango, coconut, banana, papaya, plum, apple, peach, avocado and sapodilla. Wildlife include deer, rabbits, opossum, skunk, coyote, badger, wild boar, porcupine body, bobcat and raccoon.

== Demography ==
As of 2005, the municipality had 2,068 households with a total population of 9,857 of whom 3,781 spoke an indigenous language, either Zapotec or Chontal of Oaxaca.

== Economy ==
Economic activities include cultivation of maize, beans and wheat and raising cattle, pigs and goats. Hunting is practiced for self consumption. Some Mezcal is produced. There are gold, silver, copper and lead mines, and marble and limestone quarries. Some logging is undertaken for timber to be used in making furniture. The Union of Indigenous Communities of the Isthmus Region, a cooperative founded in 1982, assists in production and distribution of the local products under a fair trade label.
