= Continuative aspect =

Grammatical aspect

The continuative aspect (abbreviated cont or cnt) is a grammatical aspect representing actions that are 'still' happening. English does not mark the continuative explicitly but instead uses an adverb such as still.

Ganda uses the prefix -kya- to mark the continuative aspect. For example, nsoma (unmarked for aspect) means "I'm reading", while nkyasoma (continuative) means "I'm still reading".

Similarly, Pipil marks the continuative aspect using the clitic -(y)uk-. For instance, nitakwa means "I am eating" or "I eat", while nitakwayuk (continuative) means "I'm still eating".

== See also ==
- The continuative perfect is a use of the perfect aspect for past situations continuing into the present.
