= Sierra Mixe =

Sierra Mixe District
- District
- Oaxaca regions and districts: Sierra Norte to Northeast
- Coordinates: 17°10′N 95°47′W
- Country: Mexico
- State: Oaxaca

Area
  - Total: 4,773.5 km^{2} (1,843.1 sq mi)

Population (2020)
  - Total: 112,447

The Sierra Mixe or Mixes District is a district in the east of the Sierra Norte Region of the Mexican state of Oaxaca. It comprises 17 municipalities and covers 4,930 square kilometers (1,900 square miles) at an average elevation of 1,200 meters (3,900 feet) above sea level. As of 2020 the district had a total population of 112,447. The main food crops are maize and beans, while permanent crops include coffee, lemon and oranges.

Most of the inhabitants are of indigenous Mixe ethnicity, and the Mixe languages are spoken throughout the region. The western part of the region is high Sierra, with climate ranging to temperate to cold with strong winds and seasons of daily and constant rains and storms, this changes to the Mixe media territories; of lower mountain ranges but still a very abrupt and rough terrain, with daily rain, ranging from tropical to mist forests to pine-encine, but the more eastern parts are the tropical lowlands of the Isthmus of Tehuantepec.

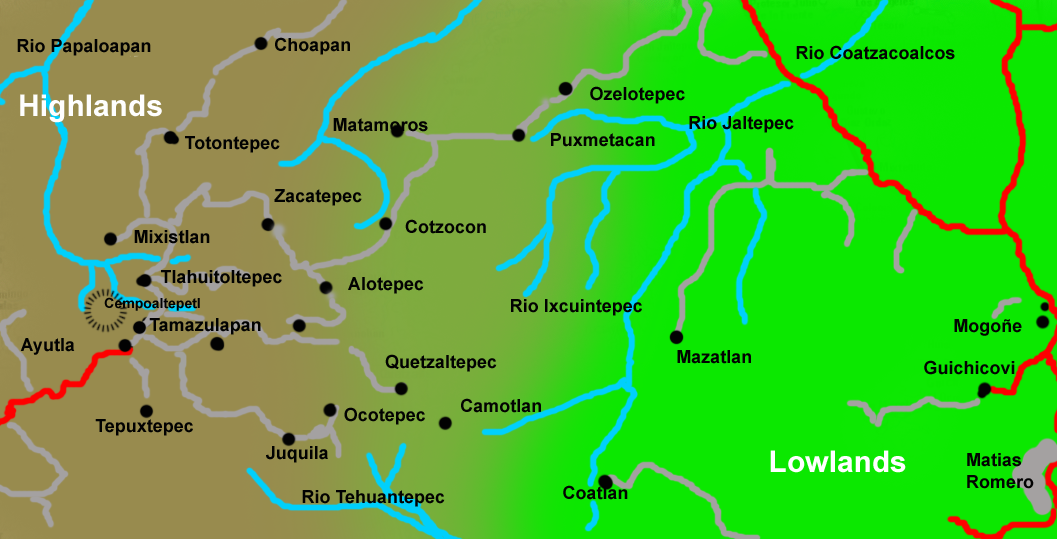
Sierra Mixe and main towns

== Municipalities ==
Mixe Municipalities

The district includes the following municipalities:

Municipality code	Name	Population		Land Area			Population density	
Municipality code	Name	2020	Rank	km^{2}	sq mi	Rank	2020	Rank
003	Asunción Cacalotepec	2,547	14	76.31	29.46	13	33/km^{2} (86/sq mi)	10
060	Mixistlán de la Reforma	2,487	15	67.71	26.14	15	37/km^{2} (95/sq mi)	8
190	San Juan Cotzocón	22,444	1	1,383	534	2	16/km^{2} (42/sq mi)	15
207	San Juan Mazatlán	19,032	2	1,628	629	1	12/km^{2} (30/sq mi)	17
231	San Lucas Camotlán	3,187	12	101.6	39.2	10	31/km^{2} (81/sq mi)	11
275	San Miguel Quetzaltepec	7,286	4	207.7	80.2	5	35/km^{2} (91/sq mi)	9
323	San Pedro Ocotepec	2,404	16	42.11	16.26	16	57/km^{2} (148/sq mi)	4
337	San Pedro y San Pablo Ayutla	5,616	8	32.71	12.63	17	172/km^{2} (172/km^{2})	1
394	Santa María Alotepec	2,796	13	98.53	38.04	11	28/km^{2} (73/sq mi)	12
435	Santa María Tepantlali	3,576	10	84.47	32.61	12	42/km^{2} (110/sq mi)	7
437	Santa María Tlahuitoltepec	9,653	3	153.1	59.1	6	63/km^{2} (163/sq mi)	3
454	Santiago Atitlán	3,556	11	70.81	27.34	14	50/km^{2} (130/sq mi)	6
465	Santiago Ixcuintepec	1,636	17	122.1	47.1	7	13/km^{2} (35/sq mi)	16
502	Santiago Zacatepec	5,089	9	213	82	4	24/km^{2} (62/sq mi)	13
517	Santo Domingo Tepuxtepec	6,029	6	113.5	43.8	8	53/km^{2} (138/sq mi)	5
031	Tamazulapam del Espíritu Santo	7,185	5	112	43	9	64/km^{2} (166/sq mi)	2
554	Totontepec Villa de Morelos	5,904	7	266.7	103.0	3	22/km^{2} (57/sq mi)	14
	Distrito Sierra Mixe	112,447	—	4,773.5	1,843.06	—	24/km^{2} (61/sq mi)	—
Source: INEGI

=== Largest cities ===
Largest cities or towns in Sierra Mixe Distric Source:
Rank		Municipality	Pop.
1	María Lombardo de Caso	San Juan Cotzocón	4,188
2	San Miguel Quetzaltepec	San Miguel Quetzaltepec	3,637
3	Santa María Tlahuitoltepec	Santa María Tlahuitoltepec	3,525
4	San Juan Cotzocón	San Juan Cotzocón	3,424
5	Tamazulapam del Espíritu Santo	Tamazulapam del Espíritu Santo	3,020
6	San Lucas Camotlán	San Lucas Camotlán	2,994
7	Santiago Zacatepec	Santiago Zacatepec	2,372
8	San Pedro y San Pablo Ayutla	San Pedro y San Pablo Ayutla	2,347
9	Jaltepec de Candoyoc	San Juan Cotzocón	2,106
10	San Felipe Zihualtepec	San Juan Cotzocón	2,034
