= San Pedro y San Pablo Ayutla =

- Municipality and town
- Location in Mexico
- Coordinates: 17°2′N 96°4′W
- Country: Mexico
- State: Oaxaca

Area
  - Total: 108.45 km^{2} (41.87 sq mi)
- Time zone: UTC-6 (Central Standard Time)

San Pedro y San Pablo Ayutla is a town and municipality in Oaxaca in south-western Mexico. It is part of the Sierra Mixe district within the Sierra Norte de Oaxaca Region.

== Geography ==
The municipality covers an area of 108.45 km^{2} (41.87 sq mi) at an altitude of 2,180 meters (7,150 ft) above sea level. The climate is temperate to cool, with warmer micro-regions in the lowlands and ravines. The rainy season begins in May and ends in October with drizzle in the rest of the year. The average temperature is 16 °C (61 °F), varying from a maximum of 31 °C (88 °F) to a minimum of 2 °C (36 °F). Forest cover is pine-oak.

== Population ==
As of 2005, the municipality had 1,014 households with a total population of 4,319 of whom 3,639 spoke an indigenous language. The main economic activity is logging.

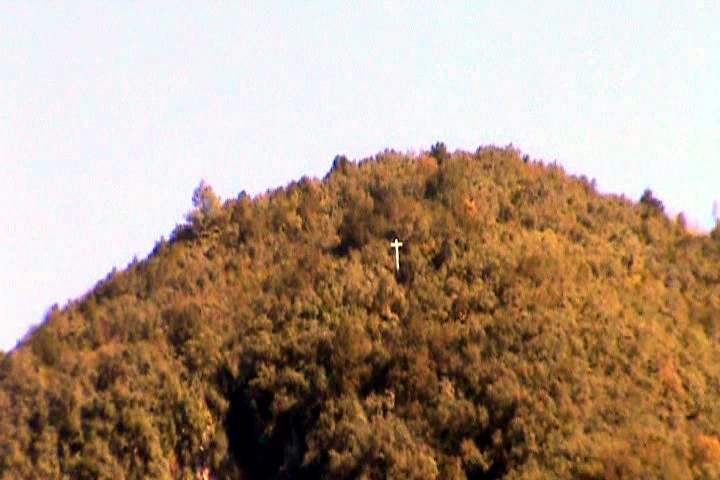
Hill of the Cross

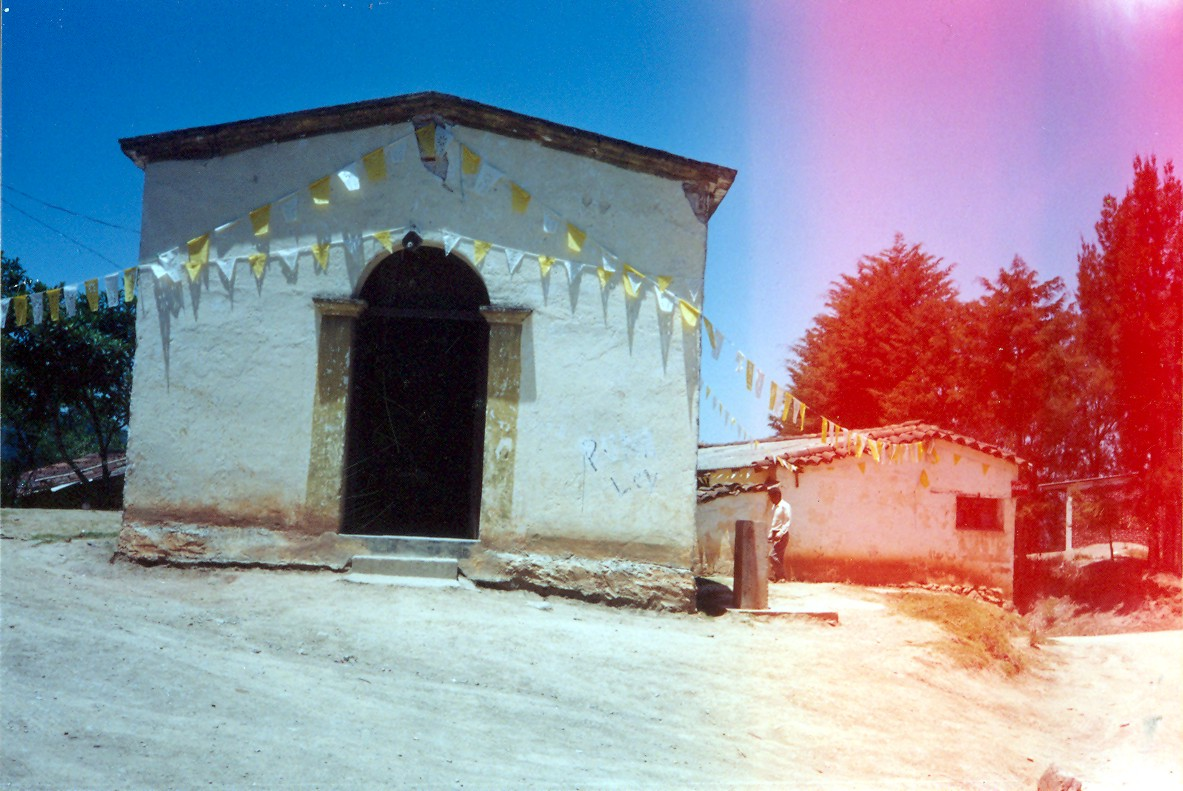
Ayutla Church

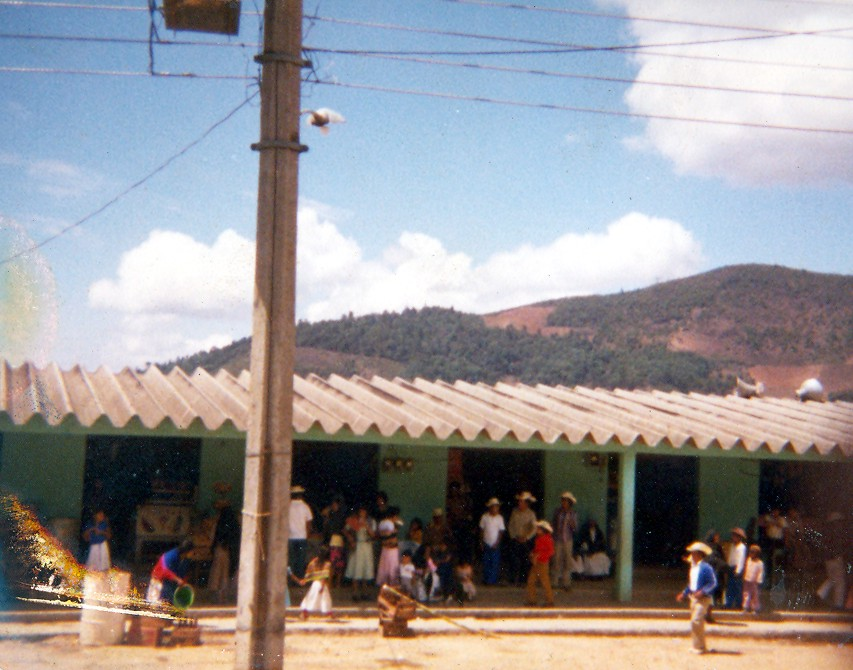
Ayutla street

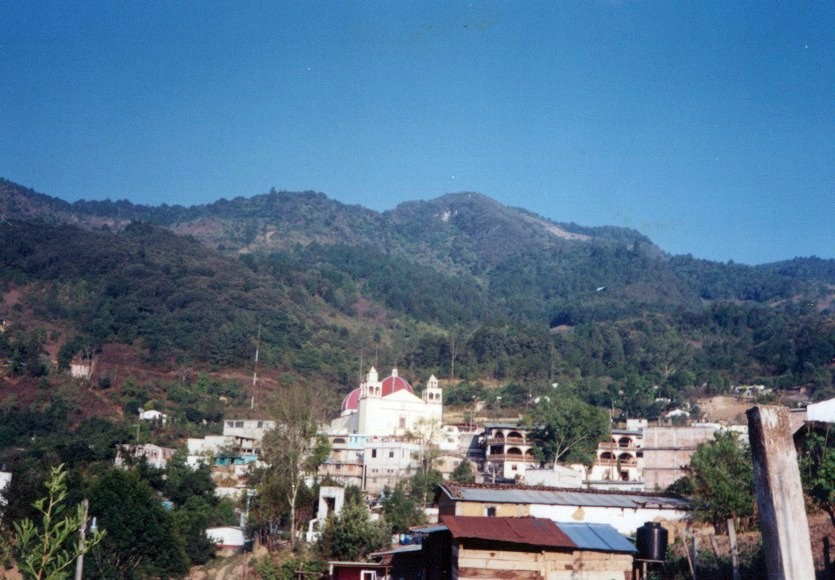
Ayutla and environments
