= Sierra Norte de Oaxaca =

- Region
- Sierra Norte in brown
- Coordinates: 17°19′50″N 96°29′14″W
- Country: Mexico
- State: Oaxaca

Area
  - Total: 8,535.5 km^{2} (3,295.6 sq mi)

Population (2020)
  - Total: 179,099
- Time zone: UTC-6 (Central Standard Time)

La Sierra Norte de Oaxaca is a heavily wooded region in the state of Oaxaca, Mexico. It is 62 km from the city of Oaxaca on Federal highway 175, heading east towards Tuxtepec. The region is divided into three districts: Ixtlán, which has 26 municipalities, Villa Alta, which has 25 municipalities and Mixe, which has 17 municipalities.

== Environment ==
The western part of the region is mountainous, containing part of the Sierra Madre de Oaxaca which includes the Sierra Juárez and Sierra de Villa Alta. To the east, the region slopes down to the Veracruz coastal plain. The area has one of the best-preserved biospheres in Mexico, as well as a number of interesting towns and villages. The region promotes ecotourism to help preserve the biosphere with various enterprises offering cabins, camping, access and guides for hiking and mountain-biking trails, horseback riding, bird-watching, and cave exploration. It is also one of richest zones of biodiversity in Mexico, with 400 species of birds and 350 species of butterflies. It contains seven of the nine types of vegetation indigenous to the country.

== Communities ==
There are a number of towns located within this area. Ixtlán is the political and economic center of the region. Ixtlan is noted for its Church of Saint Thomas the Apostle (Iglesia de Santo Tomás Apostal), which is a baroque-style church known for its portals, façades and sculptures. Capulálpam de Méndez is 9 km east of Ixtlán, and also has a church, Church of Saint Matthew (Iglesia de San Mateo) with altars representative of Mexican Baroque style. It also has the Centro de Medicina Indígena Tradicional (Center for Indigenous Traditional Medicine) which is sponsored by the Mexican Secretary of Health. It is open to the public, including tourists and offers native herbal medicines, massages, temascals and ritual cleansings.

== Largest cities ==
Largest cities or towns in Sierra Norte Region Source: INEGI
Rank		Municipality	Pop.
1	María Lombardo de Caso	San Juan Cotzocón	4,188
2	San Miguel Quetzaltepec	San Miguel Quetzaltepec	3,637
3	Santa María Tlahuitoltepec	Santa María Tlahuitoltepec	3,525
4	San Juan Cotzocón	San Juan Cotzocón	3,424
5	Ixtlán de Juárez	Ixtlán de Juárez	3,350
6	Tamazulapam del Espíritu Santo	Tamazulapam del Espíritu Santo	3,020
7	San Lucas Camotlán	San Lucas Camotlán	2,994
8	Santiago Zacatepec	Santiago Zacatepec	2,372
9	San Pedro y San Pablo Ayutla	San Pedro y San Pablo Ayutla	2,347
10	Jaltepec de Candoyoc	San Juan Cotzocón	2,106

== Indigenous peoples of the Sierra Norte ==
Various peoples of the region include the Zapotecs, Mixes, Chinantecs, Tlaxcaltecs and the Nahuas.

The Zapotecs of the Sierra Norte, who call themselves the bene xon, are one of 3 major Zapotec regions in southern Mexico. The other three reside in the Isthmus of Tehuantepec, el Valle and the Sierra Madre Oriental. Most Zapotecs are found in the Villa Alta district with some in Ixtlán and a few in Choapan. The bene xon divide into four sub-cultures: Cajonos, El Rincón, Ixtlán and Choapan.
