= San Juan =

San Juan, Spanish for Saint John, most commonly refers to:

- San Juan, Puerto Rico
- San Juan, Argentina
- San Juan, Metro Manila, Philippines

San Juan may also refer to:

== Places ==
=== Argentina ===
- San Juan Province, Argentina
- San Juan, Argentina, the capital of that province
- San Juan, Salta, a village in Iruya, Salta Province
- San Juan (Buenos Aires Underground), a metro station

=== Chile ===
- San Juan de la Costa, a commune of Chile
- San Juan (mining district)

=== Colombia ===
- San Juan de Arama, a town and municipality in Meta Department
- San Juan de Rioseco, a town and municipality in Cundinamarca Department
- San Juan del Cesar, town and municipality in La Guajira Department

=== Costa Rica ===
- San Juan District, Tibás, the capital city of the canton of Tibás, San José Province
- San Juan District (disambiguation), a list of places in Costa Rica

=== Cuba ===
- Pico San Juan
- San Juan Hill
- San Juan de los Yeras (Villa Clara Province)

=== Dominican Republic ===
- San Juan Province (Dominican Republic)
- San Juan de la Maguana

=== Guatemala ===
- San Juan Atitán
- San Juan Ixcoy

=== Honduras ===
- San Juan, Intibucá
- San Juan, La Paz

=== Mexico ===
==== Oaxaca ====
- San Juan Achiutla
- San Juan Atepec
- San Juan Cacahuatepec
- San Juan Chicomezúchil
- San Juan Chilateca
- San Juan Cieneguilla
- San Juan Coatzospam
- San Juan Colorado
- San Juan Comaltepec
- San Juan Cotzocón
- San Juan del Estado
- San Juan de los Cues
- San Juan del Río, Oaxaca
- San Juan Diuxi
- San Juan Guelavía
- San Juan Guichicovi
- San Juan Ihualtepec
- San Juan Juquila Mixes
- San Juan Juquila Vijanos
- San Juan Lachao
- San Juan Lachigalla
- San Juan Lajarcia
- San Juan Lalana
- San Juan Mazatlán
- San Juan Mixtepec, Mixteca
- San Juan Mixtepec, Miahuatlán
- San Juan Ñumí
- San Juan Ozolotepec
- San Juan Petlapa
- San Juan Quiahije
- San Juan Quiotepec
- San Juan Sayultepec
- San Juan Tabaá
- San Juan Tamazola
- San Juan Teita
- San Juan Teitipac
- San Juan Tepeuxila
- San Juan Teposcolula
- San Juan Yaeé
- San Juan Yatzona
- San Juan Yucuita

==== Other places in Mexico ====
- Colonia San Juan, Mexico City
- San Juan Chamula, Chiapas
- San Juan de los Lagos, Jalisco
- San Juan de Ulúa, a small island near the port of Veracruz
- San Juan del Río, Querétaro
- San Juan Market, Mexico City
- Nuevo San Juan Parangaricutiro, Michoacán

=== Nicaragua ===
- San Juan del Sur

=== Panama ===
- San Juan, Chiriquí
- San Juan, Colón
- San Juan de Dios
- San Juan, Veraguas

=== Paraguay ===
- San Juan Bautista, Paraguay

=== Peru ===
- San Juan (mountain)
- San Juan District (disambiguation), a list of places in Peru

=== Philippines ===
- San Juan, Abra
- San Juan, Batangas
- San Juan, Ilocos Sur
- San Juan, La Union
- San Juan, Metro Manila
- San Juan, San Jose, Camarines Sur
- San Juan, San Jose, Dinagat Islands
- San Juan, Siquijor
- San Juan, Southern Leyte
- San Juan, Surigao City

=== Puerto Rico ===
- San Juan, Puerto Rico
- San Juan Bay
- San Juan Islet

=== Spain ===
- Sant Joan d'Alacant (Spanish: San Juan de Alicante)
- Sant Joan, Majorca (Spanish: San Juan in Spanish)

=== Trinidad and Tobago ===
- San Juan–Laventille, a region
  - San Juan, Trinidad and Tobago

=== United States ===
- San Juan, California, former name of North San Juan, California
- San Juan Bautista, California
- San Juan Capistrano, California
- San Juan County, Colorado
- San Juan Mountains, Colorado
- San Juan del Puerto, Florida
- San Juan, Nevada
- San Juan, New Mexico
- San Juan County, New Mexico
- Pueblo de San Juan, in New Mexico
- San Juan, Texas
- San Juan, Starr County, Texas
- San Juan Basin, in the Southwestern US
- San Juan County (disambiguation)
- San Juan Islands, an archipelago in Washington
  - San Juan Island, the second-largest of the San Juan Islands

=== Venezuela ===
- San Juan de Los Cayos
- San Juan de Manapiare
- San Juan de Payara

== People with the surname ==
- Sanjuán (footballer) (born 1940), Spanish footballer
- Alberto San Juan (born 1967), Spanish actor
- Ángela San Juan (born 1983), Spanish swimmer
- Antonia San Juan (born 1961), Spanish actress, director and screenwriter
- Antonio Rodríguez San Juan (born 1957), Venezuelan politician
- Aureliano Maestre de San Juan (1828–1890), Spanish scientist and physician
- Bastián San Juan (born 1994), Chilean footballer
- Benito de San Juan (1727–1809), Spanish military commander
- Bernardo San Juan (born 1924), Filipino sport shooter
- Bernat Sanjuan (1915–1979), Spanish painter and sculptor
- Borja Sanjuán (born 1992), Spanish politician
- Catarina de San Juan (c. 1607–1688), slave and Christian ascetic
- Constanza San Juan (born 1985), Chilean activist
- David Michael San Juan, Filipino writer, activist and academic
- Edwin San Juan (born 1969), Filipino actor and comedian
- E. San Juan Jr. (born 1938), Filipino writer
- Gregorio de San Juan (fl. late 16th–early 17th century), Nahuatl chieftain
- Jesús García Sanjuán (born 1971), Spanish footballer
- Joaquín Valverde Sanjuán (1875–1918), Spanish composer
- Juan Huarte de San Juan (1529–1588), Spanish physician and writer
- Karel San Juan (born 1965), Filipino Catholic priest and university administrator
- Luis Davidson San Juan (1921–2011), Cuban mathematician and academic
- Miguel Ángel Fernández Sanjuán, Spanish physicist
- Olga San Juan (1927–2009), American actress
- Rossana San Juan (born 1969), Mexican actress and singer
- Sergio Vila-Sanjuán (born 1957), Spanish journalist and novelist
- Tito García Sanjuán (born 1974), Spanish futsal player, footballer and manager

== Ships ==
- ARA San Juan (S-42), a submarine of the Argentine Navy that disappeared in November 2017 in the South Atlantic
- San Juan Bautista (ship), a Japanese-built galleon
- San Juan de Silicia, a ship in the Spanish Armada that sunk off the Isle of Mull, in Scotland
- USS San Juan, various ships of the US Navy

== Sports ==
- Integración del Norte San Juan F.C., a Bolivian football club
- AD San Juan, a Spanish football club
- San Juan F.C., a Honduran football club
- San Juan Jabloteh F.C., a Trinidad and Tobago football club
- San Martín de San Juan, an Argentine football club

== Transportation ==
=== Airports ===
- San Juan Airport (Bolivia)
- Luis Muñoz Marín International Airport, also known as San Juan International Airport, Puerto Rico

=== Other transportation ===
- San Juan Airlines, an airline in Washington, US
- San Juan Express, passenger train on the narrow-gauge Denver and Rio Grande Western Railroad in Colorado and New Mexico
- San Juan metro station, a rapid transit station in Lima, Peru

== Other uses ==
- San Juan (card game) by Andreas Seyfarth, a card game for two to four players
- San Juan, a Peruvian beer brewed by Backus and Johnston
- San Juan, the Honduran name of the Gold Tree (Tabebuia donnell-smithii)
- Fiesta de San Juan, the Spanish name for Saint John's Eve
- San Juan Festival, celebrated in Moyobamba, Peru

== See also ==
- San Juan Bautista (disambiguation)
- San Juan Cathedral (disambiguation)
- San Juan High School (disambiguation)
- San Juan del Río (disambiguation)
- San Juan River (disambiguation)
- Saint-Jean (disambiguation)
- Saint John (disambiguation)
- Saint Juan (disambiguation)
- Sant Joan (disambiguation)
- São João (disambiguation)
