= San Juan District =

San Juan District may refer to:

== Costa Rica ==
- San Juan District, Abangares, Guanacaste province
- San Juan District, La Unión, Cartago province
- San Juan District, Naranjo, Alajuela province
- San Juan District, Poás, Alajuela province
- San Juan District, San Ramón, Alajuela province
- San Juan District, Santa Bárbara, Heredia province
- San Juan District, Tibás, San José province
- San Juan de Dios District, Desamparados, San José province
- San Juan de Mata District, Turrubares, San José province
- San Juan Grande District, Esparza, Puntarenas province

== Peru ==
- San Juan District, Cajamarca, in Cajamarca province, Cajamarca region
- San Juan District, Castrovirreyna, in Castrovirreyna province, Huancavelica region
- San Juan District, Lucanas, in Lucanas province, Ayacucho region
- San Juan District, Sihuas, in Sihuas province, Ancash region
- San Juan de Miraflores, in Lima province
- San Juan de Salinas District, in Azángaro province, Puno region

== United States ==
- San Juan School District in San Juan County, Utah

== See also ==
- San Juan County (disambiguation)
- San Juan (disambiguation)
