= Canto del Agua Formation =

Geological formation in Chile

- Stratigraphic range: Triassic
- Type: Geological formation
- Overlies: Llano de Chocolate Beds
- Thickness: c. 2,100 m (6,900 ft)

Lithology
- Primary: Muddy sandstone, mudstone, conglomeratic sandstone, lapilli tuff, conglomerate, limestone
- Other: Grainstone

Location
- Coordinates: 28.205043°S 70.941828°W
- Region: Atacama Region
- Country: Chile
- Canto del Agua Formation (Chile)

Canto del Agua Formation (Spanish: Formación Canto del Agua) is a geological formation in the Atacama Region of northern Chile. Its stratigraphy from top to bottom is as follows: mudstone, limestone, sandstone, mudstone, conglomerate, lapilli tuff, conglomeratic sandstone, muddy sandstone. The environment where the sediments of the formation deposited is thought to have been the "submarine section of a coarse-grained fan delta" with other authors adding that the sedimentary basin where the sediments deposited was "bounded by two normal faults of WNW strike, active during deposition". The exact relationship with the underlying Llano de Chocolate Beds is not clear. In some locations the formation overlaps directly on the Punta de Choros Metamorphic Complex.

The type locality of the formation lies next to the Plomiza mine.
