= Chañaral Epimetamorphic Complex =

- Type: Complex
- Underlies: Cifuncho Formation; Pan de Azúcar Formation

Lithology
- Primary: Metasediments including metaturbidite

Location
- Region: Atacama Region
- Country: Chile

Type section
- Named for: Chañaral

The Chañaral Epimetamorphic Complex or Las Tórtolas Formation is an accretionary complex composed of metamorphic rocks located in western Atacama Region, Chile. The rocks of the complex are mainly mica-schist, greenschist and metasediment of low-grade. The deposition of the sedimentary protoliths occurred in the Carboniferous and Permian being later metamorphosed. Among the protoliths of the complex are turbidites and other sediments. Chañaral Epimetamorphic Complex is thought to represent the shallow and frontal part of an accretionary prism while the nearby Punta de Choros Metamorphic Complex represents the deeper basal part of the very same accretionary prism.
