= San Juan River =

San Juan River may refer to:

== North America ==
=== United States ===
- San Juan Creek, also called the San Juan River, located in Orange County, California
- San Juan Creek (Estrella River tributary) in San Luis Obispo County, California
- San Juan River (Colorado River tributary) in Utah, Colorado, and New Mexico in the United States, a tributary of the Colorado River

=== Mexico ===
- San Juan River (Tamaulipas) in Mexico, states of Nuevo León and Tamaulipas
- San Juan River (Veracruz) in Mexico, state of Veracruz

=== Other places ===
- San Juan River (Guatemala), a tributary of the Pasión River
- San Juan River (Nicaragua), flows from Lake Nicaragua to the Caribbean Sea
- San Juan River (Vancouver Island), in British Columbia, Canada
- San Juan River (Dominican Republic)

== South America ==
- San Juan River (Argentina)
- San Juan River (Chile)
- San Juan River (Colombia)
- San Juan River (Uruguay)
- San Juan River (Venezuela)

== Asia ==
- San Juan River (Metro Manila) in the Philippines, a tributary of the Pasig River
- San Juan River (Calamba) in the Philippines, a tributary of Laguna de Bay

== See also ==
- San Juan River Bridge, Manila, Philippines
- San Juan (disambiguation)
