= Llano de Chocolate Beds =

Geologic formation in Chile

- Stratigraphic range: Late Carboniferous-Early Permian
- Type: Informal sedimentary unit
- Underlies: Canto del Agua Formation

Lithology
- Primary: Conglomerate, green sandstone, limestone

Location
- Region: Atacama Region
- Country: Chile

The Llano de Chocolate Beds is a geological unit of sedimentary rock in Atacama Region of Chile. Sediments forming the rock deposited during the Carboniferous and Permian. Lithologies include conglomerate, green sandstone and limestone. It was formerly considered part of the Triassic-aged Canto del Agua Formation. Llano de Chocolate Beds was deposited in an ancient forearc basin.
