= San Juan del Río (disambiguation) =

San Juan del Río is a name shared by several towns and cities in Mexico:

- San Juan del Río, Querétaro, the largest and best known.

- San Juan del Río Municipality, Querétaro

- San Juan del Río, Coahuila
- San Juan del Río, Durango
- San Juan del Río, Oaxaca
- San Juan del Río, former name of Rafael Delgado, Veracruz, prior to 1932
