= San Juan (mining district) =

San Juan is a mining district in Atacama Region, Chile. It hosts valuable reserves of copper, gold and cobalt. The ores of the district are emplaced on rocks of the Chañaral Epimetamorphic Complex. The district is traverse by the NNE-oriented Infiernillo Shear Zone. This shear zone there is marked by mylonites and synkinematic migmatites. Alteration minerals found in the host rocks associated with the ores include biotite, epidote, tourmaline, chlorite. In addition there are rocks hardened by silicification, oxidized or hosting clay.
