= USS San Juan =

Three ships of the United States Navy have been named USS San Juan. The first retained her mercantile name when acquired by the Navy; the latter two were named for the capital of Puerto Rico.

- The first USS San Juan (SP-1352) was acquired by the Navy from the San Juan Packing Company of Seattle and used as a minesweeper and patrol boat during World War I.
- The second USS San Juan (CL-54) was an Atlanta-class anti-aircraft cruiser that served during World War II.
- The third USS San Juan (SSN-751) was the first of the "improved" Los Angeles-class submarines, capable of under-ice operations.
