= Borja Sanjuán =

Spanish politician

Borja Jesús Sanjuán Roca (born 1992) is a politician of the Spanish Socialist Workers' Party (PSOE). He was appointed to the city council in Valencia in 2020 and has led his party there since 2024.

== Biography ==
Sanjuán was born in the Tres Forques neighbourhood of Valencia. At age 15, he joined Joves Socialistes, the youth sector of the Socialist Party of the Valencian Country (PSPV). He earned three degrees in law, political sciences, and economics from the University of Valencia. He then did a master's degree in law at the National University of Distance Education.

Sanjuán did work experience at the European Parliament for Vicente Garcés, and at a law firm. He then worked as a consultant for the Corts Valencianes, the Generalitat Valenciana and the Ayuntamiento of Valencia, as well as the spokesperson of the Socialist Party of the Valencian Country (PSPV) of the city of Valencia. In 2016, he joined the cabinet of advisors to Ximo Puig, President of the Valencian Government.

In late 2018, Sanjuán left his role with Puig to become an advisor to Sandra Gómez, leader of the Socialist group in the city council. He was placed eighth on their list for the 2019 Valencia City Council election, and seven were elected. Councillor for the treasury Ramón Vilar died suddenly in July 2020, and Sanjuán was confirmed as his replacement in his seat and his role. In October 2022, while the matter was awaiting a decision from the European Commission, Sanjuán asked the Archbishop of Valencia, Enrique Benavent Vidal, to voluntarily pay property tax on properties not used for worship.

In November 2022, an anti-fraud investigation into Sanjuán, spurred by an anyonymous tip-off, was closed without charge. Gómez said that Sanjuán's salary as an associate professor at the University of Valencia had always been declared, and that opposition figures such as María José Catalá of the People's Party (PP) were also paid by universities while involved in politics.

Gómez named Sanjuán second on the Socialist list for the 2023 Valencia City Council election. Control of the council went to the right, with Catalá sworn in as mayor. In July 2024, Gómez resigned due to election as a Member of the European Parliament, and Sanjuán was voted her replacement as the Socialist leader in the council.
