= San Juan High School =

San Juan High School may refer to:

- San Juan High School (California)
- San Juan High School (Utah)
