= San Juan Achiutla =

- Municipality and town
- Location in Mexico
- Coordinates: 17°20′N 97°31′W
- Country: Mexico
- State: Oaxaca

Area
  - Total: 49.76 km^{2} (19.21 sq mi)

Population (2005)
  - Total: 401
- Time zone: UTC-6 (Central Standard Time)

San Juan Achiutla is a town and municipality in Oaxaca in south-western Mexico. The municipality covers an area of 49.76 km^{2}. It is located in a mountain range, between the hills Negro to the East, Yucuquise to the Northwest, Cuate to the North and Totolote to the South. It is crossed by the river Los Sabinos and has a dam called Cahuayande. Its weather is temperate. It is in the Mixteca Alta (the High Mixteca), one of the three parties that make up the Mixteca region and in the Mixteca Alta is part of what was Achiutla, the significant Prehispanic place.

As of 2005, the municipality had a total population of 401.

== The Mixteca ==
In 1906 the French scientist Leon Diguet published in Paris the following about La Mixteca:

The mountainous and hilly region which is the Mixtec Indians' country formed, after the Spaniards' establishment, La Mixteca province, was designated by the Nahuas with the Mixtecapan name, a word derived from the Nahuatl word Mixtlan (cloudy or foggy land), made up term by Mixtli (cloud) and the suffix tlan, locative, place. This name would have been given to the country because the cold weather frequently prevails over the elevated regions of the High Mixteca Mountains.
This territory includes the current geographical division, an important Oaxaca State part and a fraction of the States of Puebla and Guerrero.
The Mixtec name given to this country before the conquest is unknown, we only know by Father Antonio de los Reyes, missionary who settled in Teposcolula around 1593. A Mixtec grammar author, the Mixtecs were named Mixtoquijxi (wild cats) by their neighbors the Zapotecs, designation probably ironic and coming from the roughness of the places that these Indians had chosen to settle.

== Achiutla ==
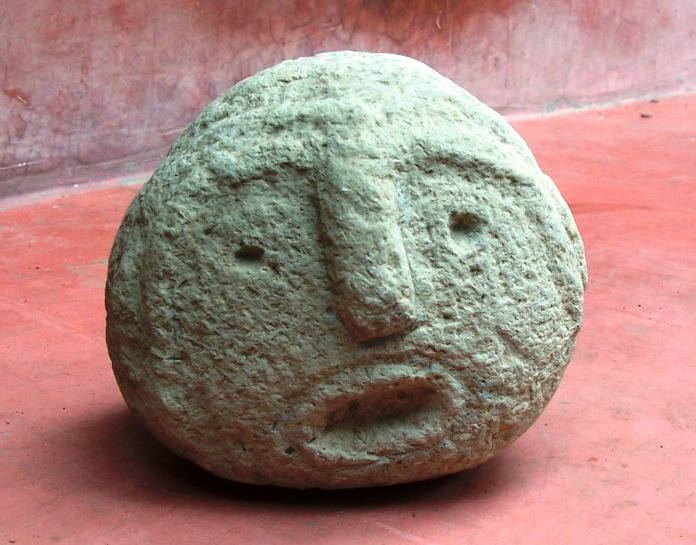
The Achiutla man. Pre-Columbian piece. San Juan Achiutla.

Leon Diguet also wrote about Achiutla:

Two locations are identified as being the Mixtec country colonization focal point: Apoala and Achiutla. These settlements have grown and flourished as urban centres which although now reduced to simple towns, before the European conquest were flourishing cities.
Achiutla or Achutla (Achioztlan) is represented today - wrote Diguet 1906- by two towns located a short distance one from another San Juan Achiutla and San Miguel Achiutla, in that the total population barely reaches 1,800 individuals. The average altitude taken between the two populations is 1,800 metres (5,900 ft). The ancient city of Achiutla was north of the town of San Miguel, on the plateau where today the Church stands.
Before the conquest the population likely reached 14,000 inhabitants, but it significantly reduced following a "mazahuatl" epidemic.
Established in the High Mixteca center, Achiutla was the chief who ruled the Mixtécapan residence. After the schism that divided the country into three principalities, this city was the spiritual center or the Taysacca or religious leader residence. The temple was famous, they came from everywhere to worship a deity considered to be a personification of Quetzalcoatl. It was represented by a large emerald on which were carved a bird and a snake. This jewel excited the Spaniards' admiration of its perfection. It was destroyed by the missionaries as described below.

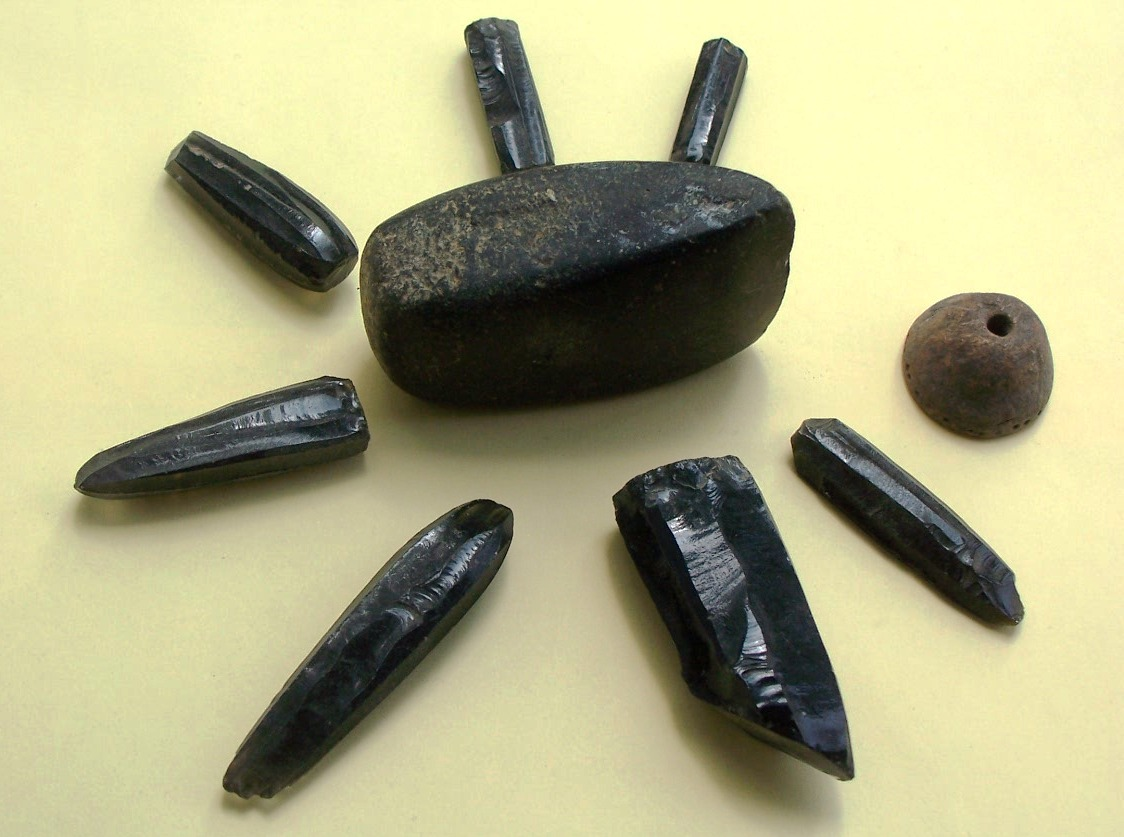
Stone Axe, obsidian arrowheads and malacate which were found in San Juan Achiutla.

On the old city edge opens a cave the entrance suggest a tunnel that connects with the town of San Juan and by which, in times of war one could go from one to another.
The Achiutla Nahuatl name seems to come from this cave. Deconstructing it is in effect: achio means frequent, oztli, cave, tlan, locality or place: place of the cave frequented. Another possible etymology is as follows: Atl water, chipimi dripping, otli road, tlan locality or place: site were the roads oozing water.
For the Mixtec name, Sundecu or Sundico Mixtec, nunu village, and dico pulverized made dust. This name would have been given to the city because the revered Emerald would have been reduced to dust by the missionaries.
Achiutla's geographical location splendor and religious importance are probably the causes have done, so to consider as the Mixtec nation origin place. Although nowadays the information doesn’t exist can prove their priority over Apoala.

Jansen and Pérez Jiménez refer to Achiutla in their Paisajes Sagrados: códices y arqueología de Ñuu Dzaui as follows:

In the Codex Añute (Selden), p. 6-III, we see how the 6 Monkey Princess embarks on a journey underground. Apparently starts from an opening in the rock wall over a river, where it is venerated the El Corazón del Pueblo de la lluvia jewel (The rain people’s heart, Ñuu Dzaui, the Mixtec people); probably it is the cave Ñuu Ndecu (Achiutla) where the El Corazón del Pueblo packaging (1934 Burgoa, I: 319, 332-333) was preserved. The Princess began with asking for permission to Ñuhu, probably the entrance guardian to the underground hall: named Hueso-Coa, Yeque Yata, can decipher as "bone (yeque) before (yata)".

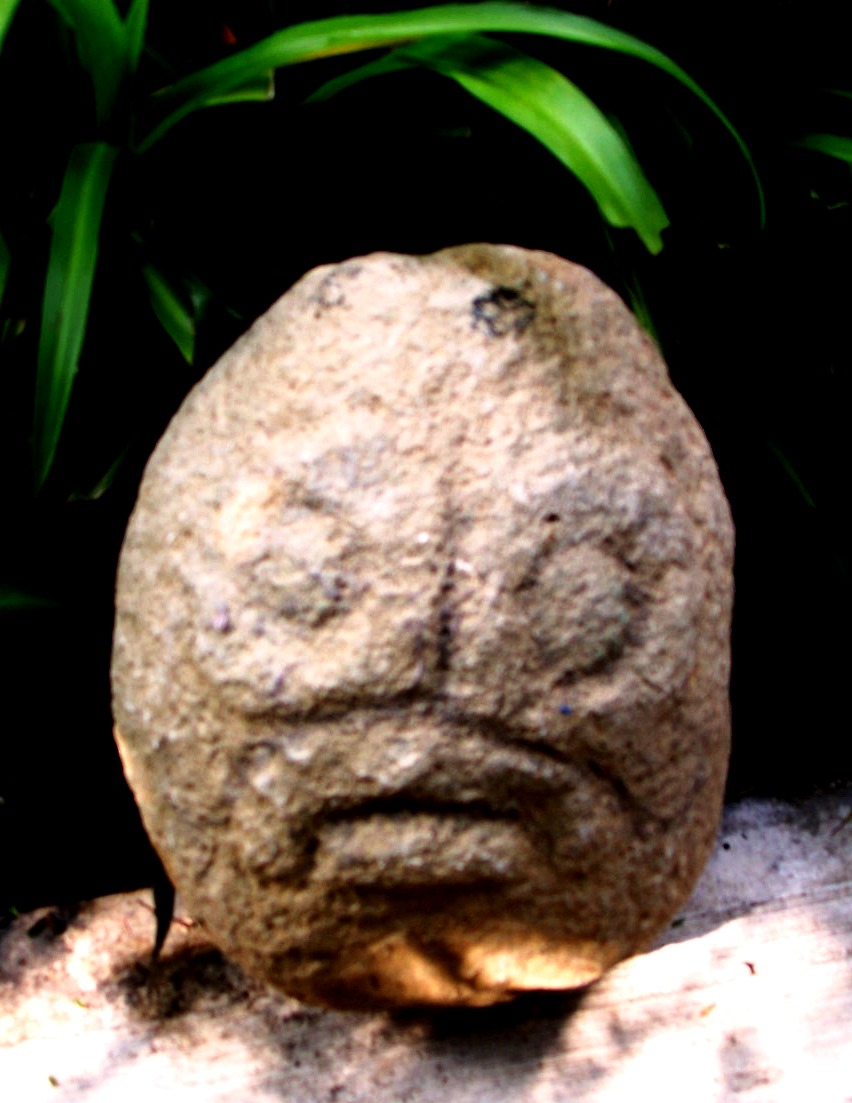
Dzahui ,Pre-Columbian rain deity is here represented as a raindrop.San Juan Achiutla.

Manuel A. Hermann Lejarazu explains in his work on the Codex Yucunama:

Focus on the High Mixteca area, the most mountainous and elevated Ñuu Dzaui part. In the pre-colonial era, the kingdoms of Ñuu Tnoo (Tilantongo), Chiyo Cahnu (Teozacoalco), Ñuu Ndaya (Chalcatongo), Ndisi Nuu (Tlaxiaco) and Ñuu Ndecu (Achiutla) flourished here, among others.
The Sun and Venus gods threw darts from the sky with which drilled the big hill precious the place of sand. One of his darts fertilized the Earth and thus was born the first ancestor of the lineage. The Primordial Lord's granddaughter, married a prince, who was born from a big tree in the City on Flames, Ñuu Ndecu, the current Achiutla.
Achiutla, as is at the present known Ñuu Ndecu ("Burning City"), was in ancient times the High Mixteca spiritual center, the:
"This nation [Mixtec] Great Temple, where all its resolutions for peace and wars had his consultations Oracle [...];" "they came from other distant provinces to ask favour and ask him in his works, doubts and what must be done". The pre-Hispanic settlement was largest and most important: more than four thousand families lived in their beautiful valleys next to rivers, occupying in the work of the field, "and so they are not neglect, had indicated as criers, official elected for a year, so that every morning at the first light, uploaded on top of the House of his Republic""with great shouts, they rang and excitasen all, saying: come out, come out to work, to work" (Burgoa, 1934b I: chaps. 23-26).
With qualifying Ñuu Ndecu as the Great Temple in Ñuu Dzaui - Mixtec nation-, chroniclers makes an implicit comparison with the Aztecs famous largest temple in their capital, Mexico-Tenochtitlan. Even today stands the old pyramid silhouette, a kind of Acropolis, which tradition referred to as the Sun Temple. All this is as we said, on a hill with promontory between rivers(which run north to South). On the Western side, the river Los Sabinos passes; on the eastern side the Yute Uha, "Salt River", and Yute Ita, "Flowers River" passes. At the foot of the convent's promontory, these streams come together and form the Yute Ndaa, "Extended River " or "Blue River".
The oral tradition of the place holds that Ñuu Ndecu valley was formerly a large lagoon, which barely lifted the promontory and the Siki Tinduu. It is the primordial lake concept, which like the darkness is a metaphor for the area which we see today the world's creation.

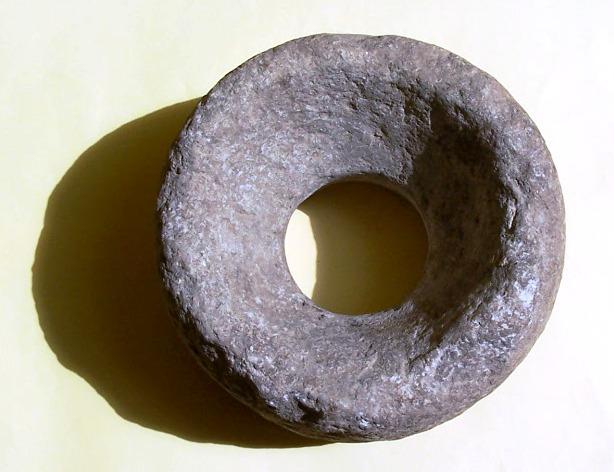
Negrito Stone, Mixtec household utensil used from pre-Columbian times into the 20th century, Burning splints of wood were inserted into the center, providing light in the night and early morning. Basalt. Diameter 13 cm (5.1 in), height 8 cm (3.1 in). San Juan Achiutla

The two priests led stones of power - the Rain's God stone and the Lizard stone--to the Yuta Tnoho sanctuary (Apoala), where they received blessings and instructions from the 9 Lizard Lady, who reigned there (Codex Añute, p. 1-III). We notice in passing the conceptual overlap between this lizard stone and the lizard relief in a building early Huamelulpan. Ñuu Ndecu (Achiutla), the priests placed these stones next to the primary lagoon at the great Ceiba foot, made their prayers spread her blood on paper and offered ground “piciete”. Then, the tree was opened and gave birth to the ancestor founder, Lord 2 Grass "Deceased which manifests as a Feathered Serpent". Six brothers, probably six noble Añute families (Jaltepec) ancestors followed him. I.e., this origin story tells us about a group of seven men who were born from the Ñuu Ndecu tree, the principal of which was the dynasty ruler (yaa tnuhu iya toniñe) founder.

In this regard, Jansen and Pérez Jiménez, also depict:

By this magic and religious act grew in that place the Origin Great Tree, which lifted and holds the sky. It was the “Tree of the Eye”, Yutnu Nuu, a ceiba or a pochote, surrounded by snakes of fog and darkness, that is to say by mysterious and impressive superhuman powers. They were offered to him - placed in basket and jícara (a vegetal and natural bowl) - jade and gold, wealth in abundance -the eagle and the fire serpent - power to transform and fly into trance, as a ball of fire - as well as the hand with the knife and the rope - civilian authority.
With him were born: the Lord 1 Eagle, Water; the Lord 3 Water, Maguey; the Lord 5 Deer, Turkey; the Lord 5 Movement, Quail; the Lord 5 Lizard, Rain, and the Lord 5 Eagle, Rain. They were the primary founders and owners, which gave life to the region. They were the first Nuuddzahui (Mixtec).

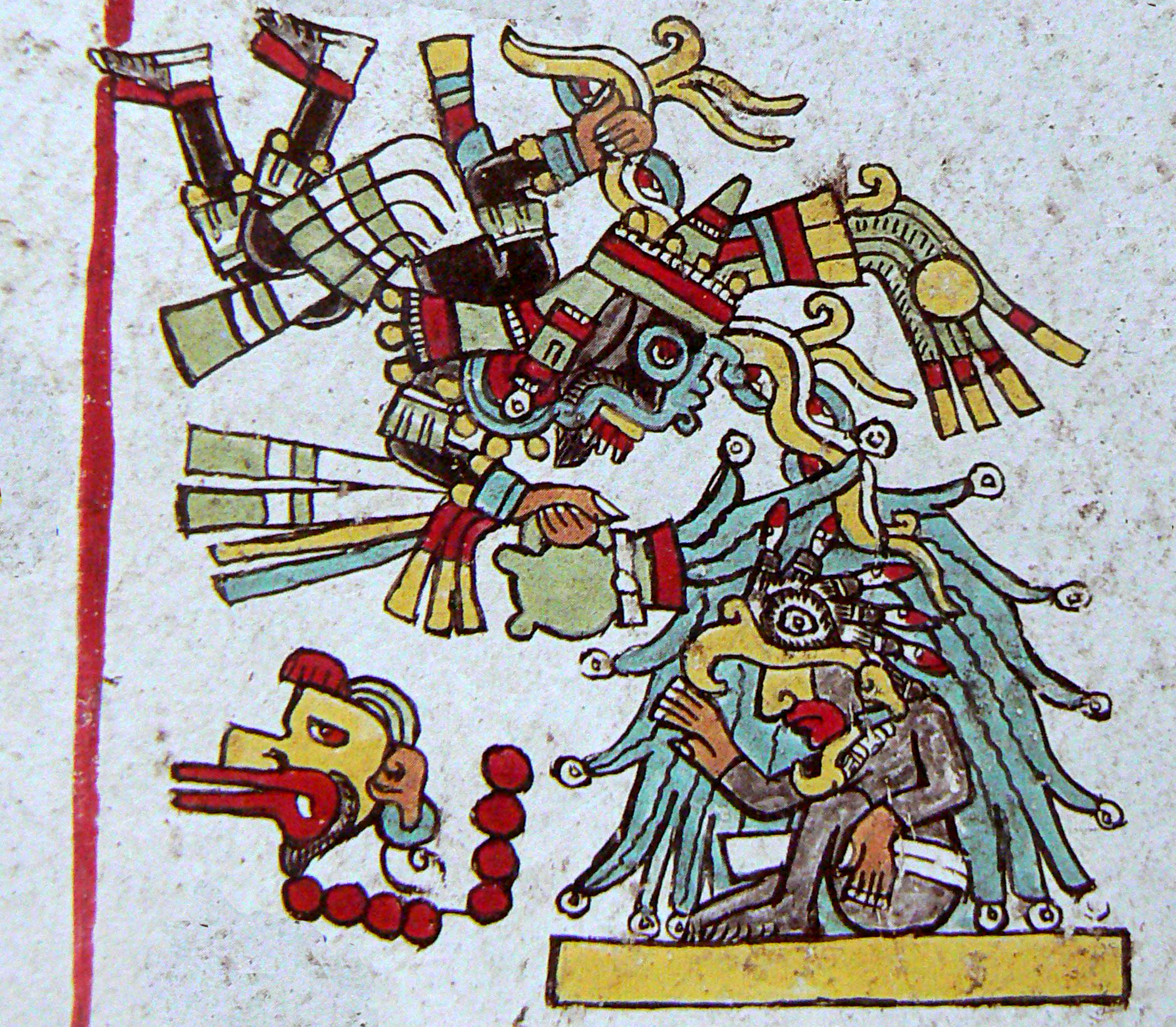
The god Dzahui consecrate a Mixtec ruler by pouring over him with his jug (Nutall Codex, page 5, back).

Hermann Lejarazu continues:

The Ñuu Ndecu important position as the spiritual center of Ñuu Dzaui and kernel of his liturgical and political life in the pre-colonial era is also expressed in the main deity worshipped name here. The main sanctuary was at the highest mountain summit, where the high priest gave worship to the Sacred Wrapper called The People's Heart. Wrapped in precious fabrics was an ancient jade stone in a large chili pepper size, sculpted in a bird, and a coiled snake form. In other worlds, a Feathered Serpent picture the Mesoamerica divine power, known as Quetzalcoatl in Nahuatl.

The People's Heart - say Burgoa - represented the Mixtec people lineage founder:

Making sacrifices and worshiped its first founder said he was the People´s Heart and kept it in a safe place and sacrificed to it valuables things as gold and precious stones. Front of the Heart always burned wood, where they burned copal or incense too.
This People's Heart also appears in the Ñuu Dzaui pictorial manuscripts, specifically in the Codex Añute (Selden), page 6-III, where it is painted as a precious stone with " The People of the Rain Heart" name (Ini Ñuu Dzavui), in other words, "The Mixtec People’s Heart”. It is situated in a large cave on top of a river.

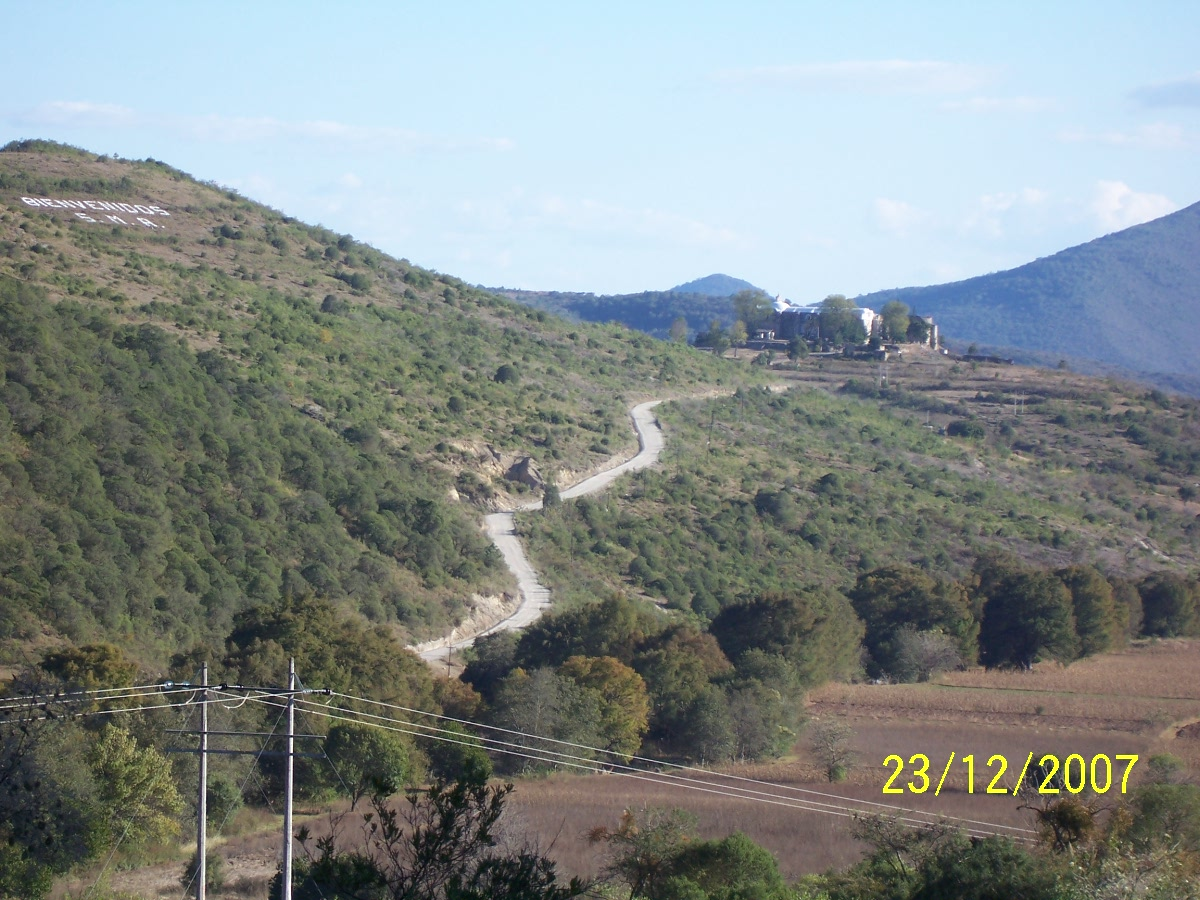
Ñuu Ndecu path to and site, the City in Flames, Achiutla, colonial and pre-Columbian archaeological site

Pérez Ortiz quotes the historian and Dominican Francisco de Burgoa's description made about this piece in 1674, more than one hundred years after its destruction:

:…and between their infamous altars, they had one devoted to an idol, called The People´s Heart, that was great veneration object, and a greatly appreciated matter, because it was an emerald as large as a big chili pepper from this earth, had carved above a little bird, with great gracefulness, and top to bottom coiled a little snake did with the same art, the stone was transparent. It shined from the bottom, where it seemed like a candle burning flame; it was a very ancient jewel, that there was no memory of the commencement of its worship and adoration .:
These historical references--continues Lejarazu - aren't sufficient to identify The People’s Heart worship exact place, nor their accurate relationship with the Achiutla’s Oracle. It is clear the river represents the Ñuu Ndecu deep valley.

It appears in the 15th century, Achiutla was conquered by the Aztecs, who destroyed and burned their main temple, in 1462 the temple and the city suffered the fire, to this fact is due to carry the Mixtec name of Ñuu Nducu in one of their etymologies meaning burned town or city in flames.

Achiutla, Ñuu Ndecu, is waiting for its historical and archaeological recovery, relevant to the Mixtec culture, the State of Oaxaca and Mexico; as well as claim linguistic and ethnic indigenous, of the Mixtec Indian, object sometimes of denial, rejection and self-destruction of the maternal ethnic, language and culture, effects of colonialism and racism, to supplant the dignity and wealth that involve to belong to this ancient culture, even alive.

== San Juan Achiutla's Colonial period traces ==
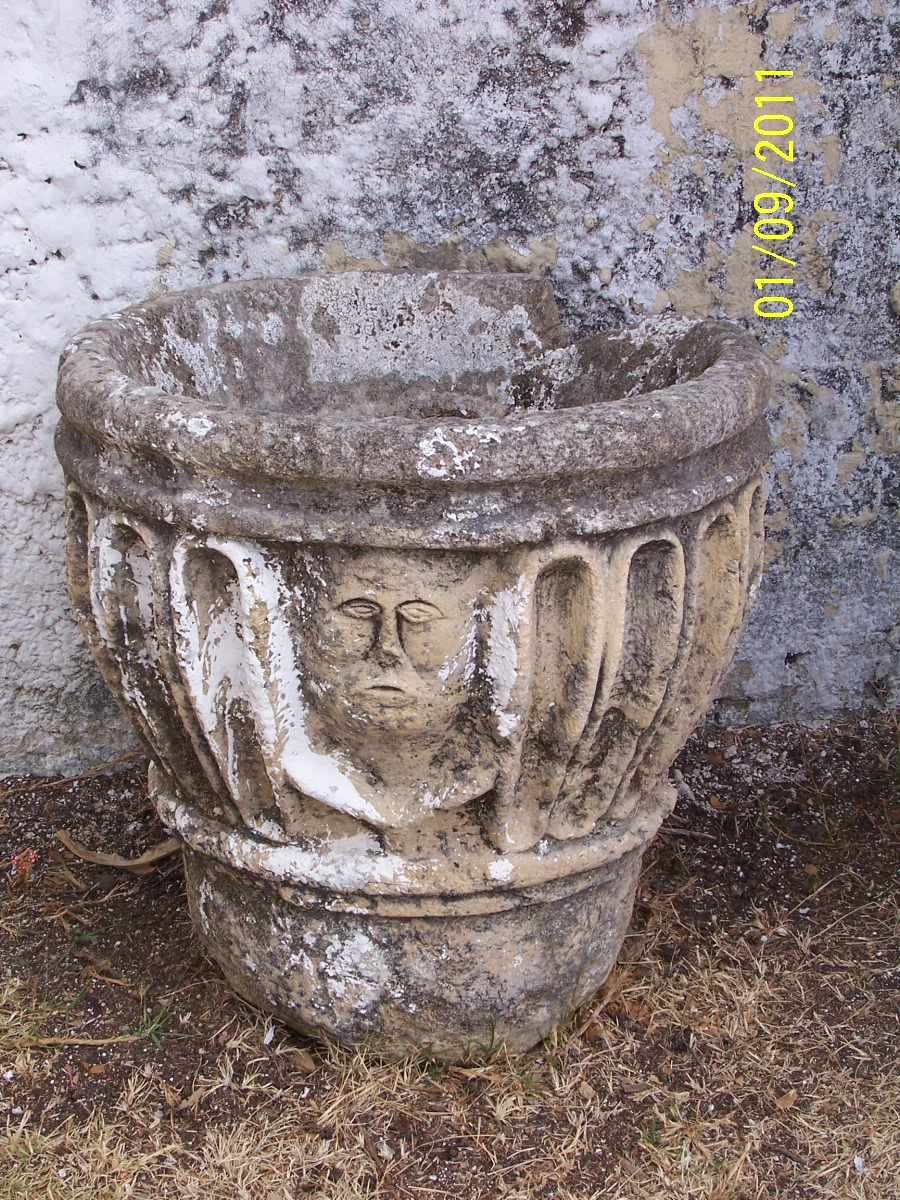
San Juan Achiutla's Baptismal font. Colonial period

When in the Aztec capital, Tenochtitlan, took news of Hernán Cortés and his troops arrival to Veracruz - concerns Alfonso Pérez Ortiz citing José Antonio Gay – Moctecuhzoma (Moctezuma) sent an embassy with some gifts for "The People’s Heart" deity and consult the Oracle "to know the fate that was reserved for his people", the Ñuu Ndecu "Pontiff" came to the shrine and "The people that had been left to the party from outside"", they heard between confusing noise of voices" the fateful announcement that "the Moctezuma lordship is over...¨." The Lord 2 Vulture, Snake of Fire-Sun and Mrs. 13 House, Flower of Bat, ruled Ñuu Ndecu when in the Land of the Rain, were known these dire first news concerning the Spaniards.

From 1522 to 1528 Achiutla, what would be San Miguel and San Juan, was subjected unduly by the conquer Martín Vázquez who would be prosecuted for mistreating and threatening death to the people's chiefs by not delivering extraordinary tributes and pretended to be the legitimate encomendero. In 1528 Achiutla became part Francisco Maldonado's encomienda its real owner, Ñuu Ndecu contributed to him 48 gold dust "tejuelos". In 1550 his encomienda and "Achiotla" (Achutla) passed to doña Isabel Roxas (Rojas) his wife.

In 1555 the viceroy don Luis de Velasco ordered to allow entering Santo Domingo religious order to Achiutla, since the encomendero's cleric of the place prevented. The Dominicans settled finally in 1557 in Ñuu Ndecu founded their community, at the time they would build the "doctrine-convent".

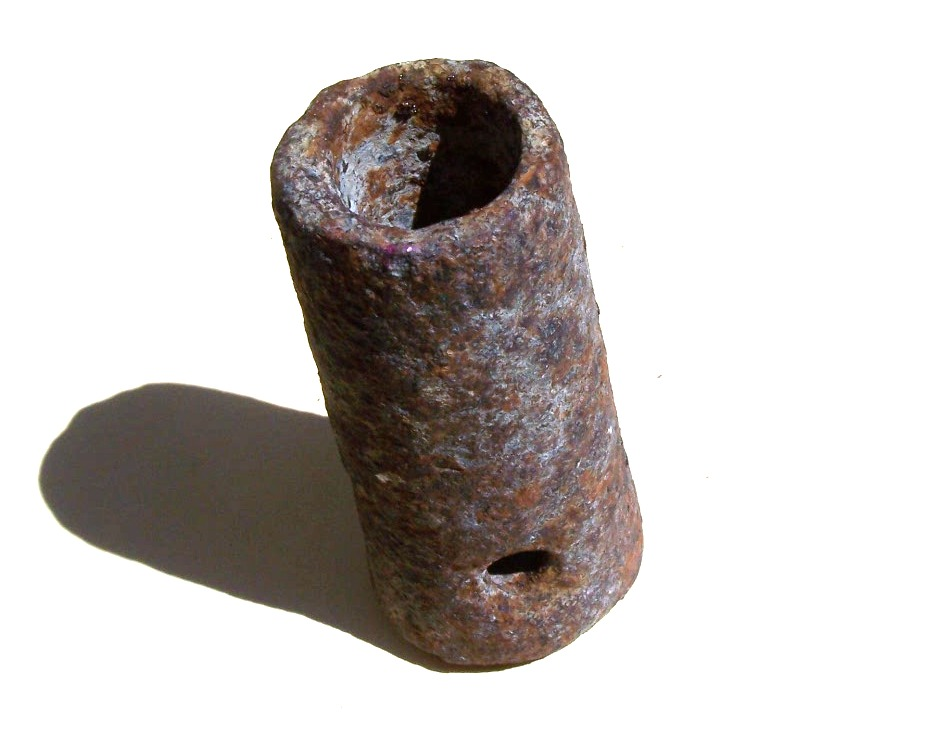
Explosion chamber. In a large number were used in San Juan Achiutla from the colony until the early 20th century rather than rockets, it was filled with gunpowder and detonated by the hole in the side. Iron. 10 cm high, 4.5 cm wide at the base.

Among the Dominican religious who came to Achiutla was Fray Benito Hernández who wrote his Christian catechism written in Mixtec, and to whom is attributed the evangelization of the Mixtecs of Ñuu Ndecu; people that continued practicing their ancient religious customs in a hidden form in the caves and hills close to the place making worship to "The People’s Heart" deity . Fray Benito heard about the existence of this image and rose to the summit in question, where destroyed the ceremonial center.

:…an immensity of several figures of idols, which were in niches, on stones stained foolishly of human blood and smoke of incense which sacrificed them. (Burgoa)

And he got done in The People's Heart” deity.

:…and have a solemn day prevented, and together many towns, pulled the stone and he broke it with great difficulty, through instruments, because its hardness, sent grind it into powder there […] and mixed with ground, he threw and stepped on, in front of the eyes of a huge crowd that attended the event, and then made them a big sermon…(Burgoa)

So the pulverizing of this jewel, would be a little after 1557 (Pérez Ortiz, 2009).

1580 There were few Spaniard settlers in the Mixtec communities in the mountains, because they avoided visit them for fear of its inhabitants.

In 1584 San Juan Achiutla land titles were issued by the colonial government, that in 1748 issued communal titles.

From this last period, the San Juan Evangelista's Church in San Juan Achiutla retains the following historical trail: an oil painting approximately 1.4 for 1.2 m whose lower part said "Don Juan Ortiz and his wife doña María Daniel devotion year 1749". The work has several levels; the top appears the Holy Trinity, in the central part an Archangel, then Saint Dominic and St. Francis of Assisi. At the next level the purgatory image: a man with the papal tiara, another with the bishop tiara, one cleric, a woman and a man, all burn between the flames; below represents a solemn mass attended by men on the right and women on the left. On the deteriorated work lower place we can read: "F. García Ruiz and José Isidro Ruiz, José de la Luz...", and more illegible words in red. It could be inferred that at that time there was sufficient financial capacity of some people as to order to do oil paintings possibly out of the town, probably in the San Miguel convent or Teposcolula, make solemn Eucharistic celebrations, and the existence of sufficient population and economic activity could be inferred to generate at least medium-sized wealth.

The colonial period, the 19th century and the Mexican Revolution at San Juan Achiutla are pending of being researched and counted. At this point we know that in:

- 1825, San Juan Achutla Nusuñe (it was its name then) was part of the constituency of the called Partido de Tlaxiaco.
- 1844 was a village of the Achutla's Partido, sub-prefecture of Tlaxiaco, Teposcolula district.
- 1858 again belonged to the Tlaxiaco's District.
- 1891 was a municipality in the Tlaxiaco's District.

== Contemporary period ==
San Juan Achiutla has no municipal archive so it is virtually impossible to do a history based on the documentary source. If we compare with people, we could say that the municipality works verbally; it would seem that municipality is in illiteracy in the absence of documentary collections.

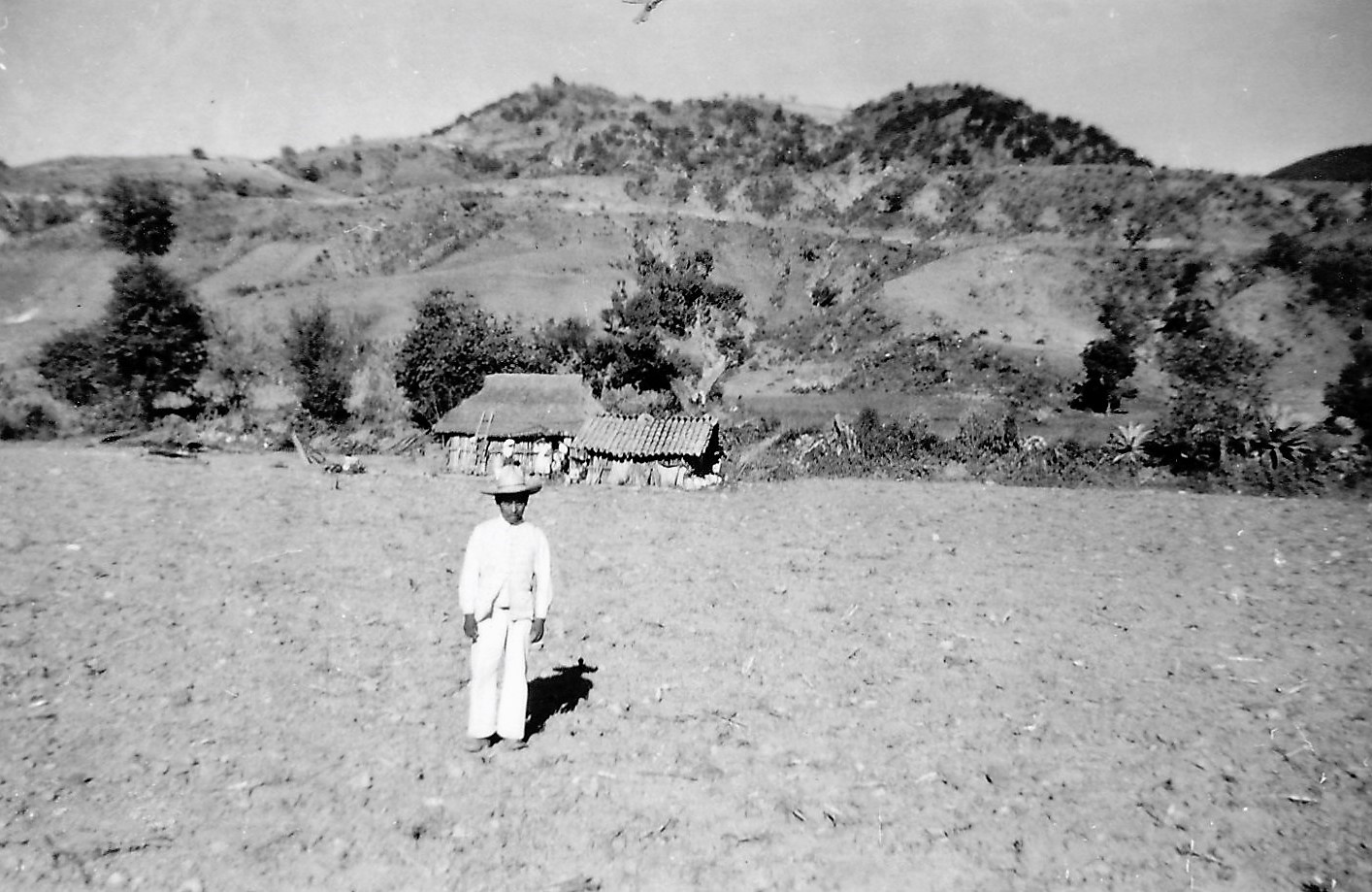
1945, a peasant and his "jacal", a rural house mainly used at that time in San Juan Achiutla.

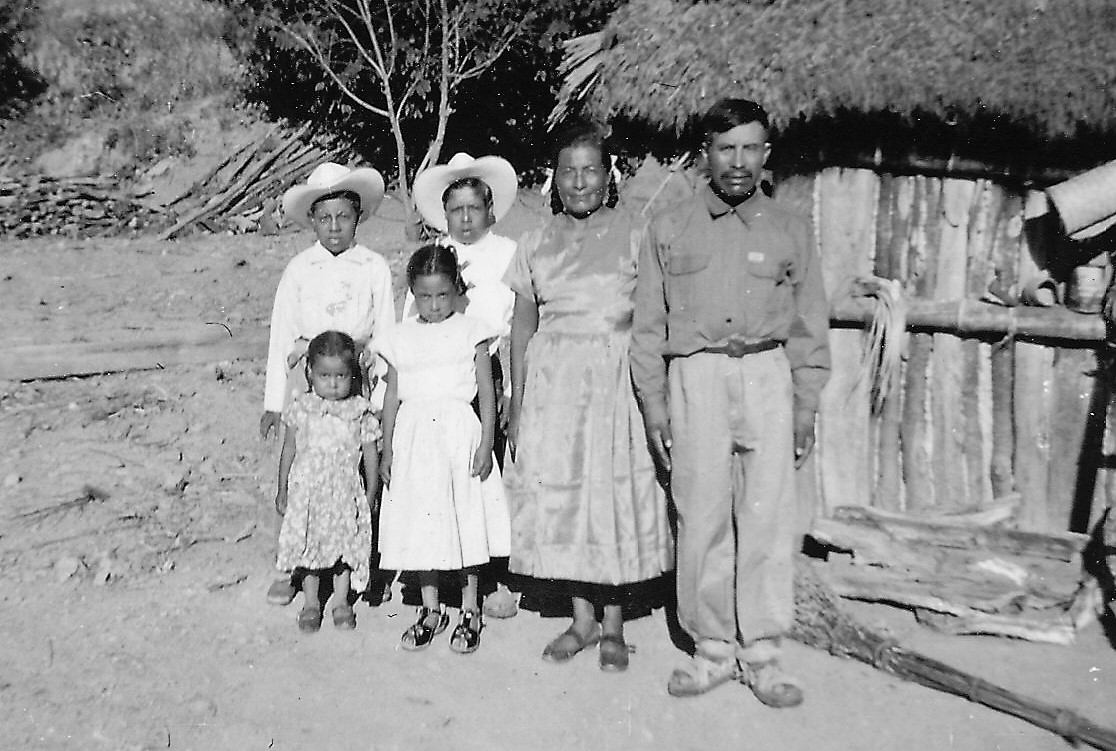
1945, family from San Juan Achiutla

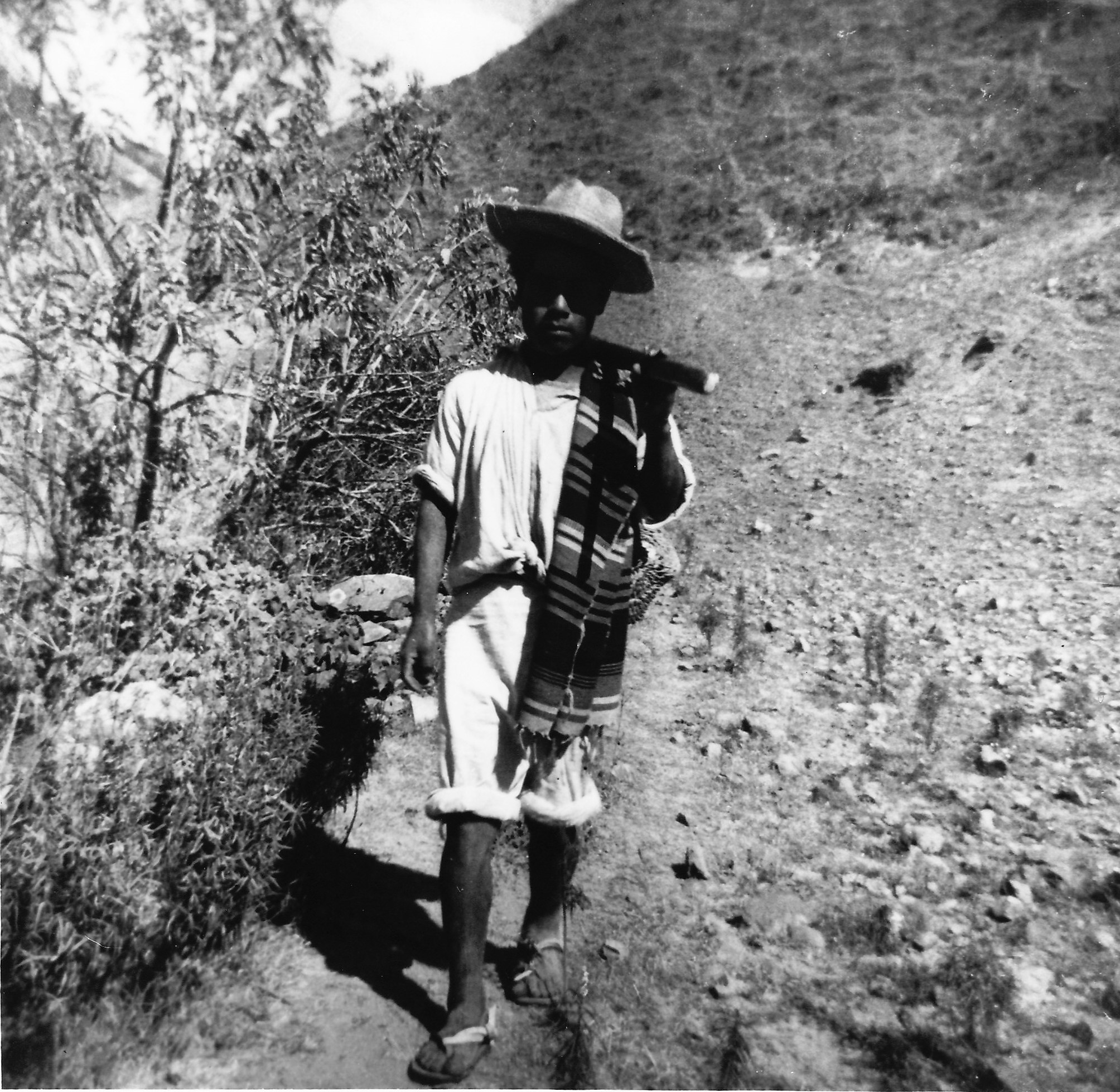
1945, peasant of San Juan Achiutla with usual clothing at that time.

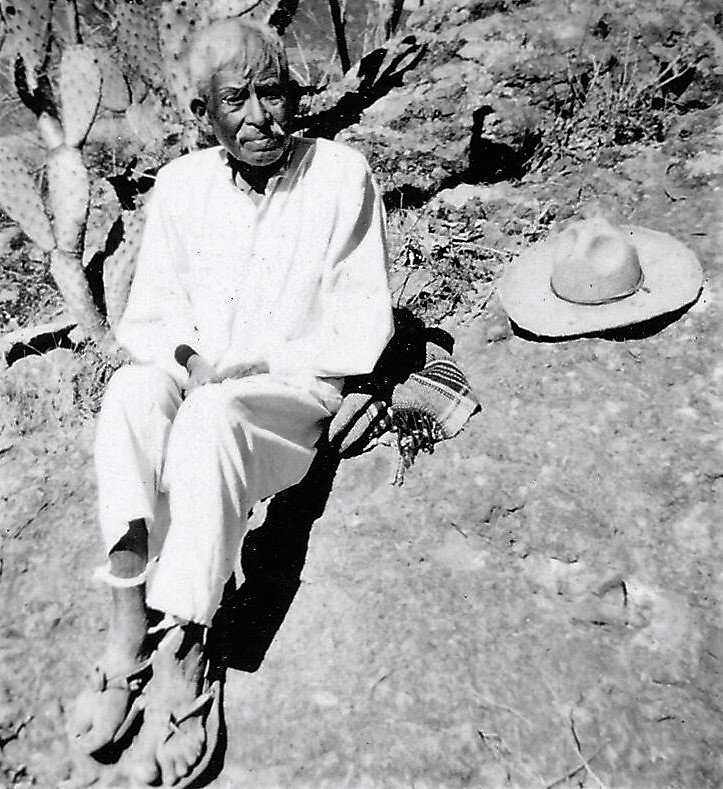
1945, Teodoro Trujillo, countryman of San Juan Achiutla

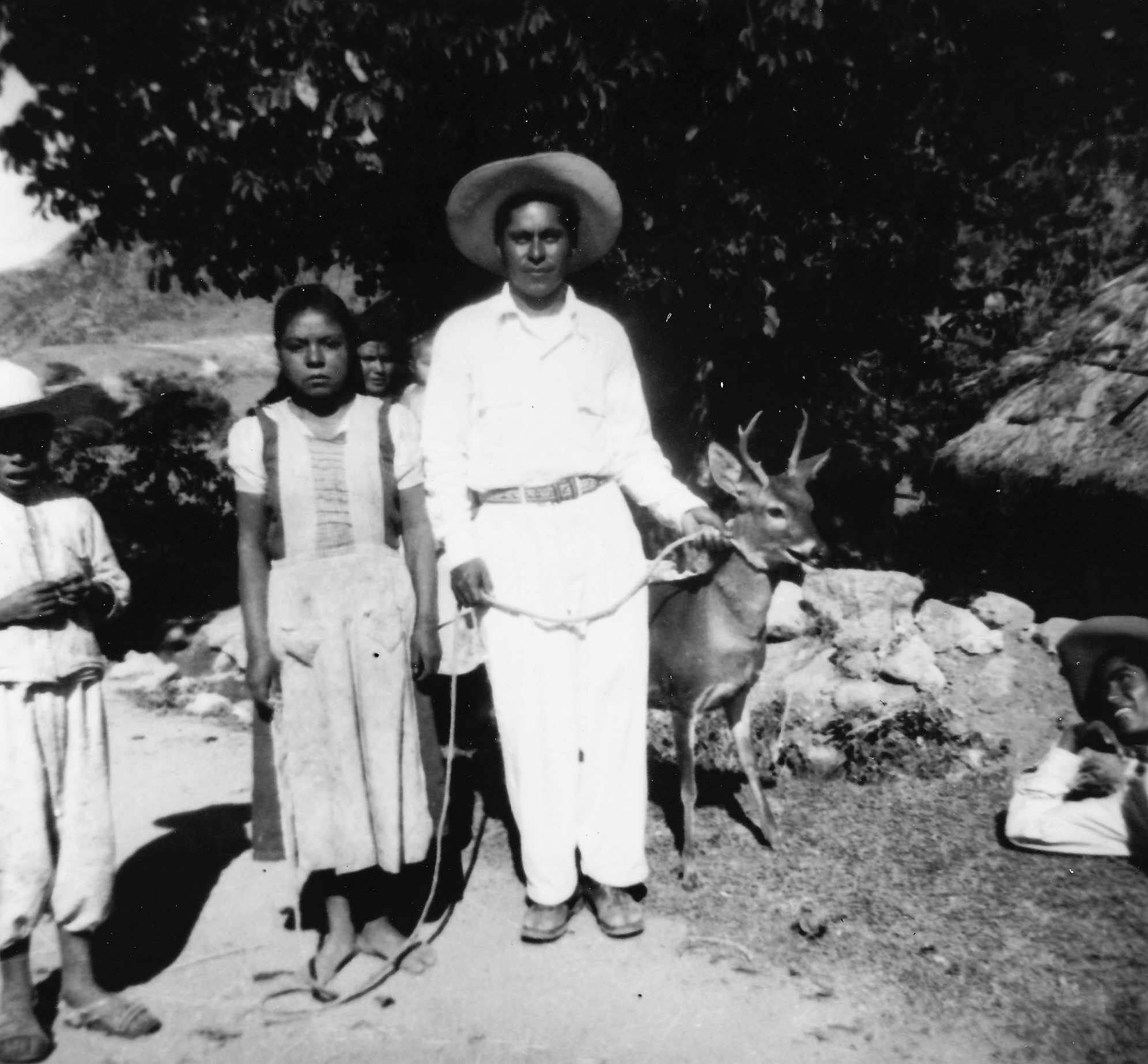
1948, San Juan Achiutla inhabitants, the young man with the deer was Jesús A. Ruiz Sánchez

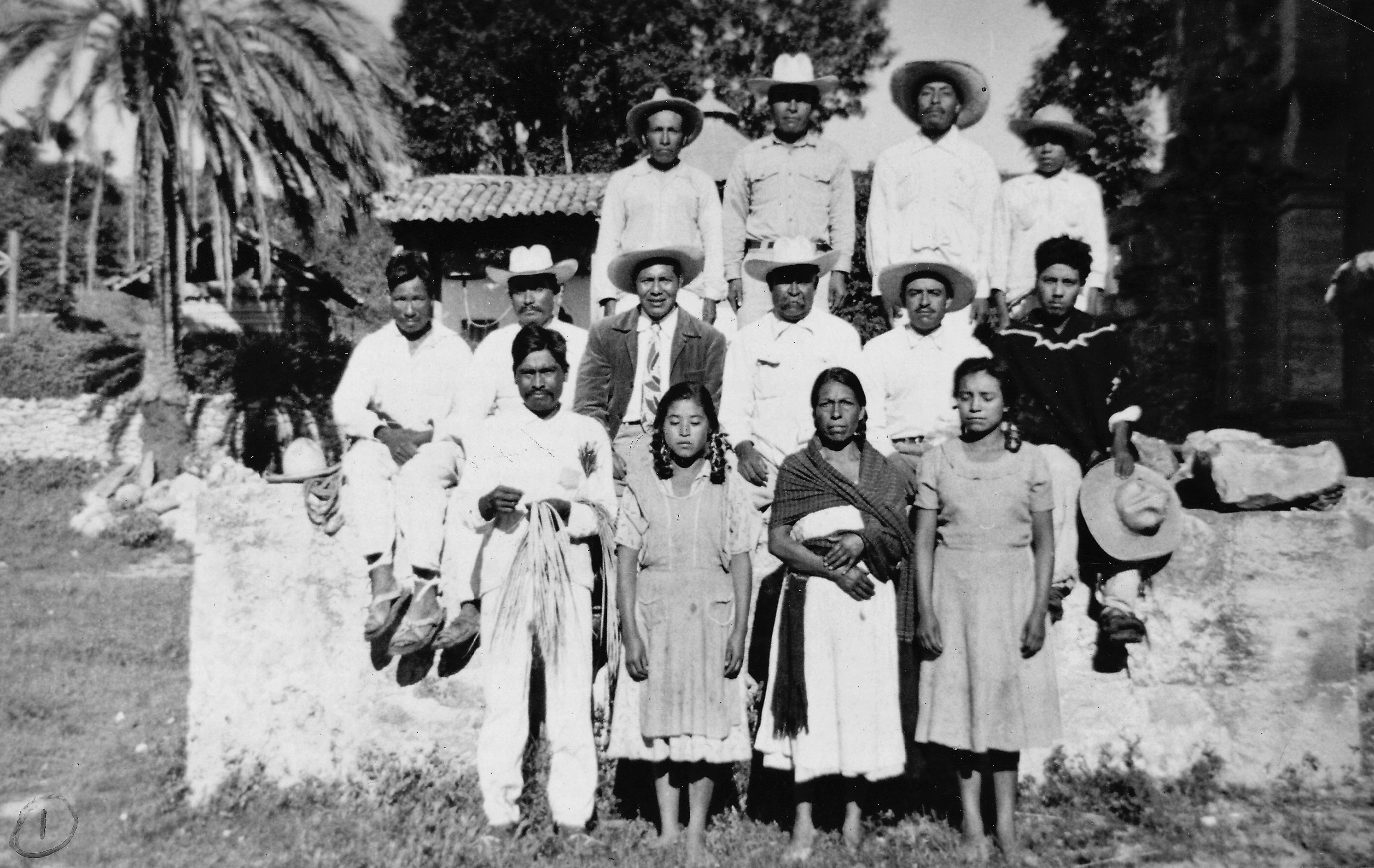
1952, San Juan Achiutla's people, at the center with gray moustache, don Rutilio Ruiz Hernández, and with tie, Raúl Ruiz Bautista

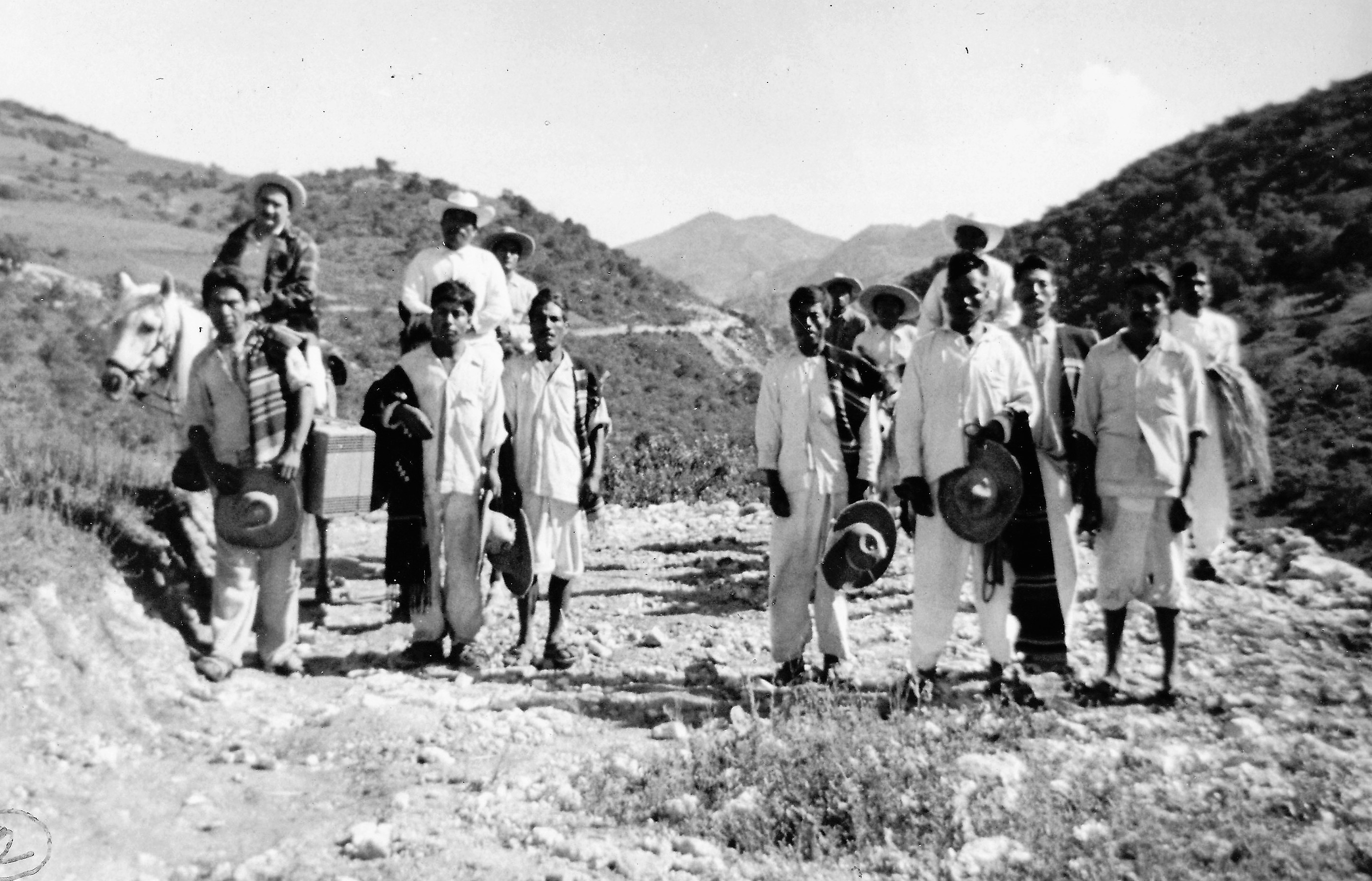
1953, San Juan Achiutla peasants during the Ixtapa - Tlacotepec road construction

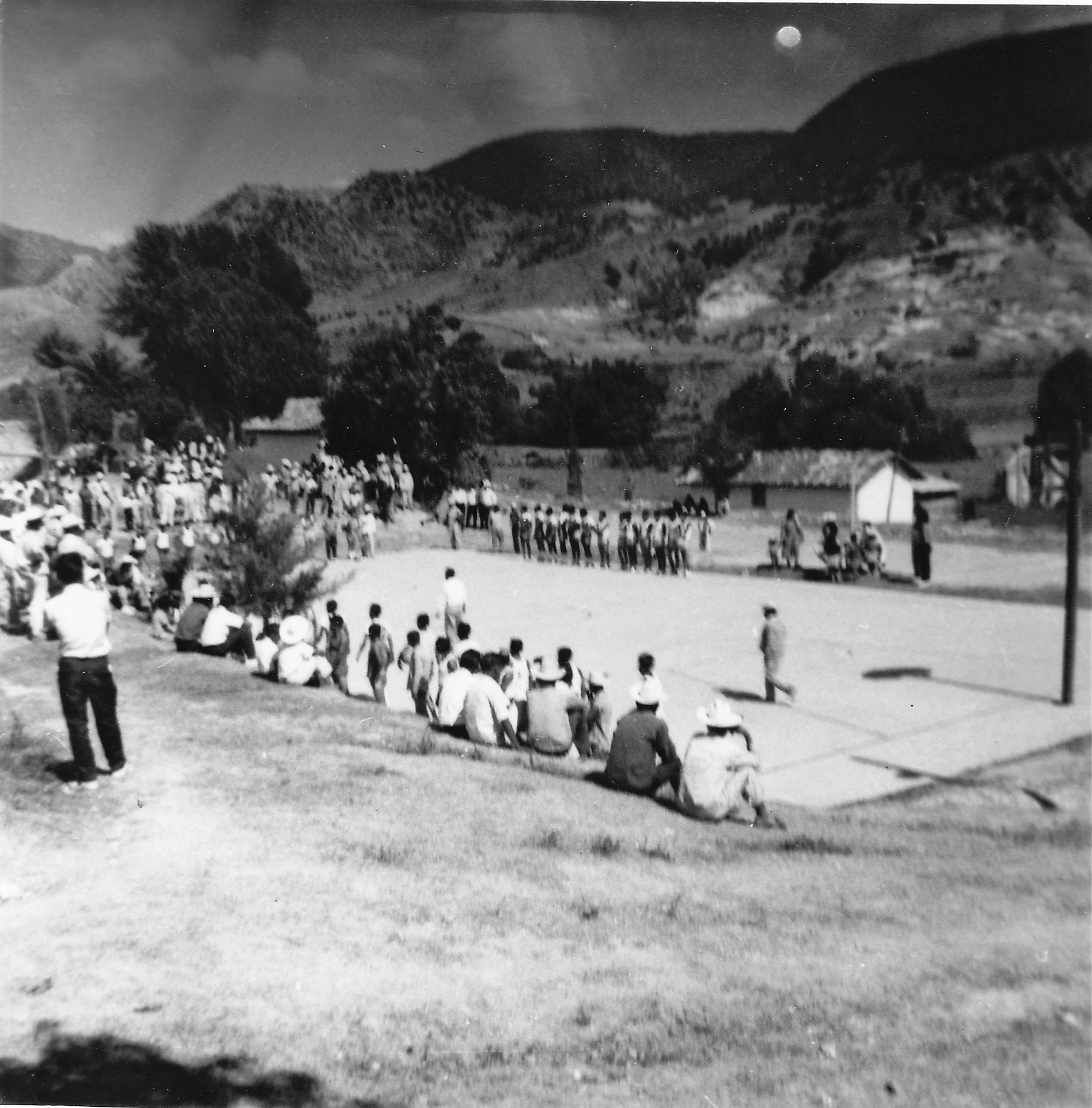
1957, basquetball games, patronal fest of San Juan Achiutla.

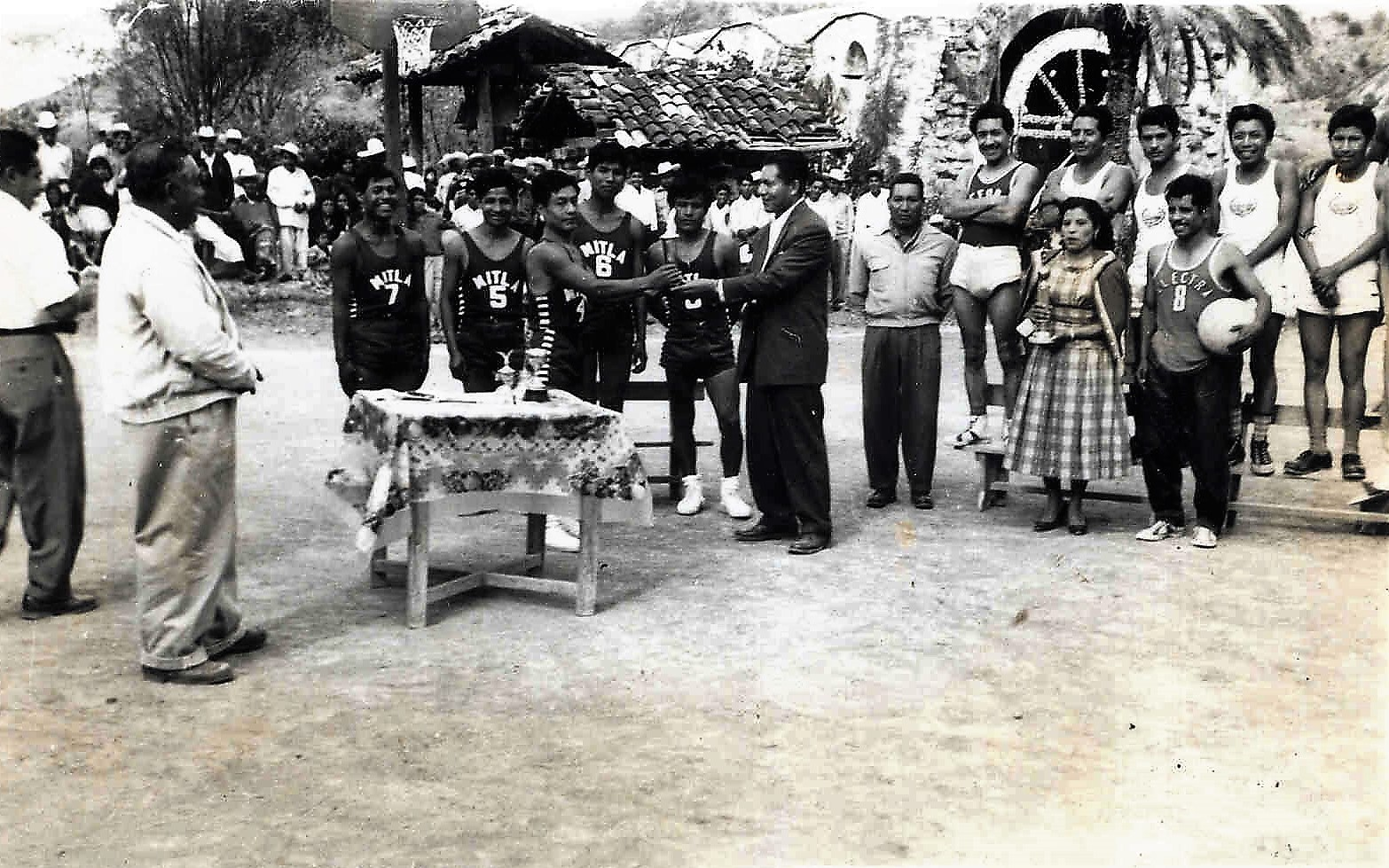
1957, basquetball games award ceremony, patronal fest of San Juan Achiutla. Dressed in dark suit giving the coup, Raúl Ruiz Bautista

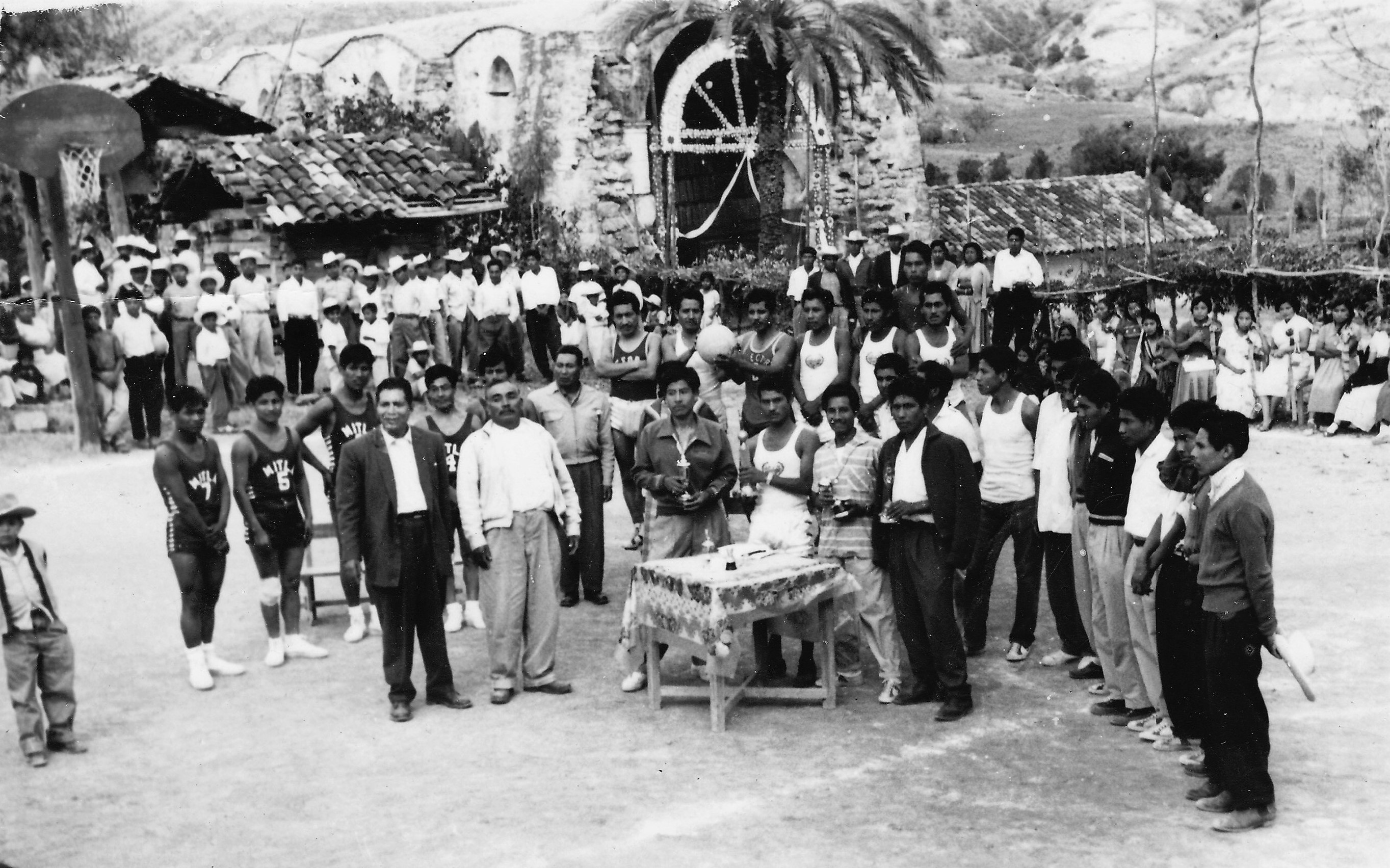
1957, basquetball games award ceremony, patronal fest of San Juan Achiutla. Dressed in dark suit, Raúl Ruiz Bautista

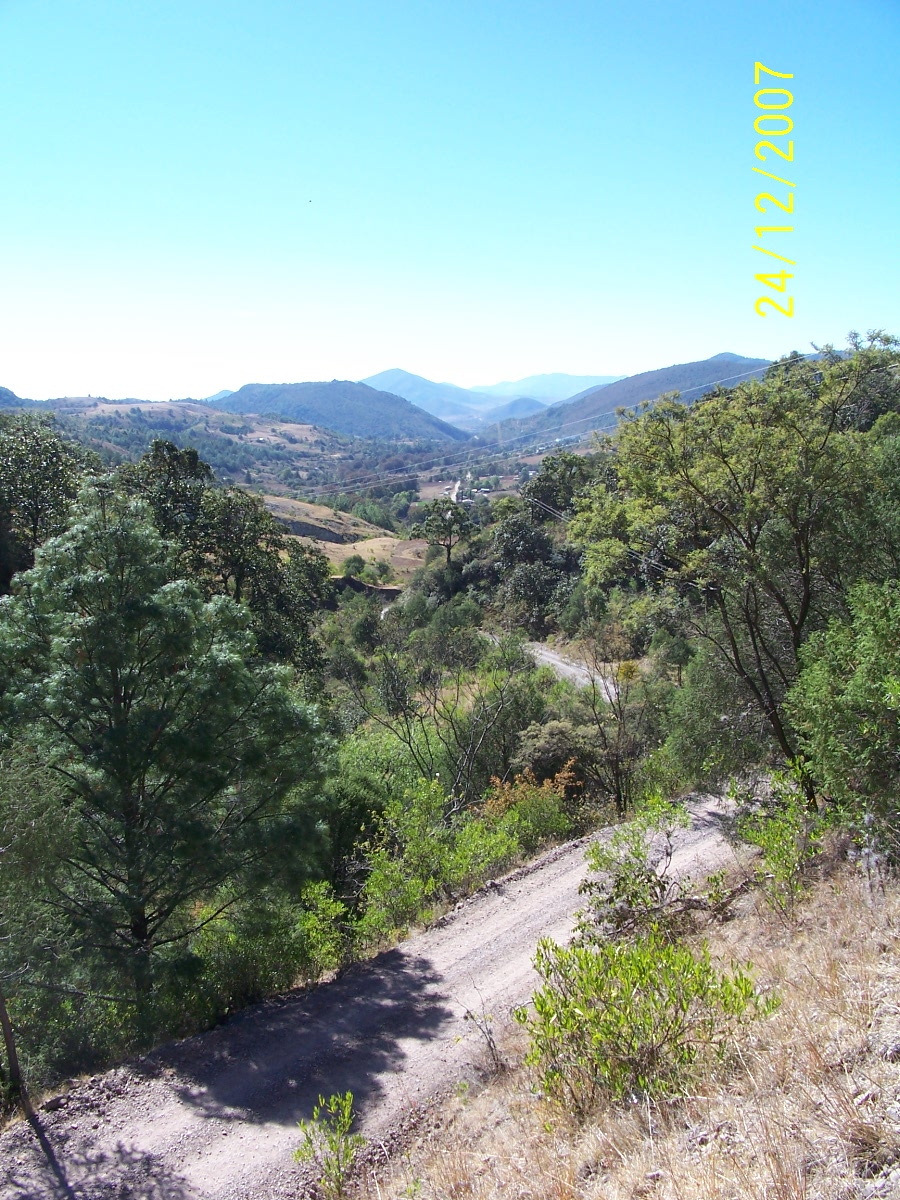
Ixtapa-Tlacotepec road reaches San Juan Ñuu Ndecu, Achiutla

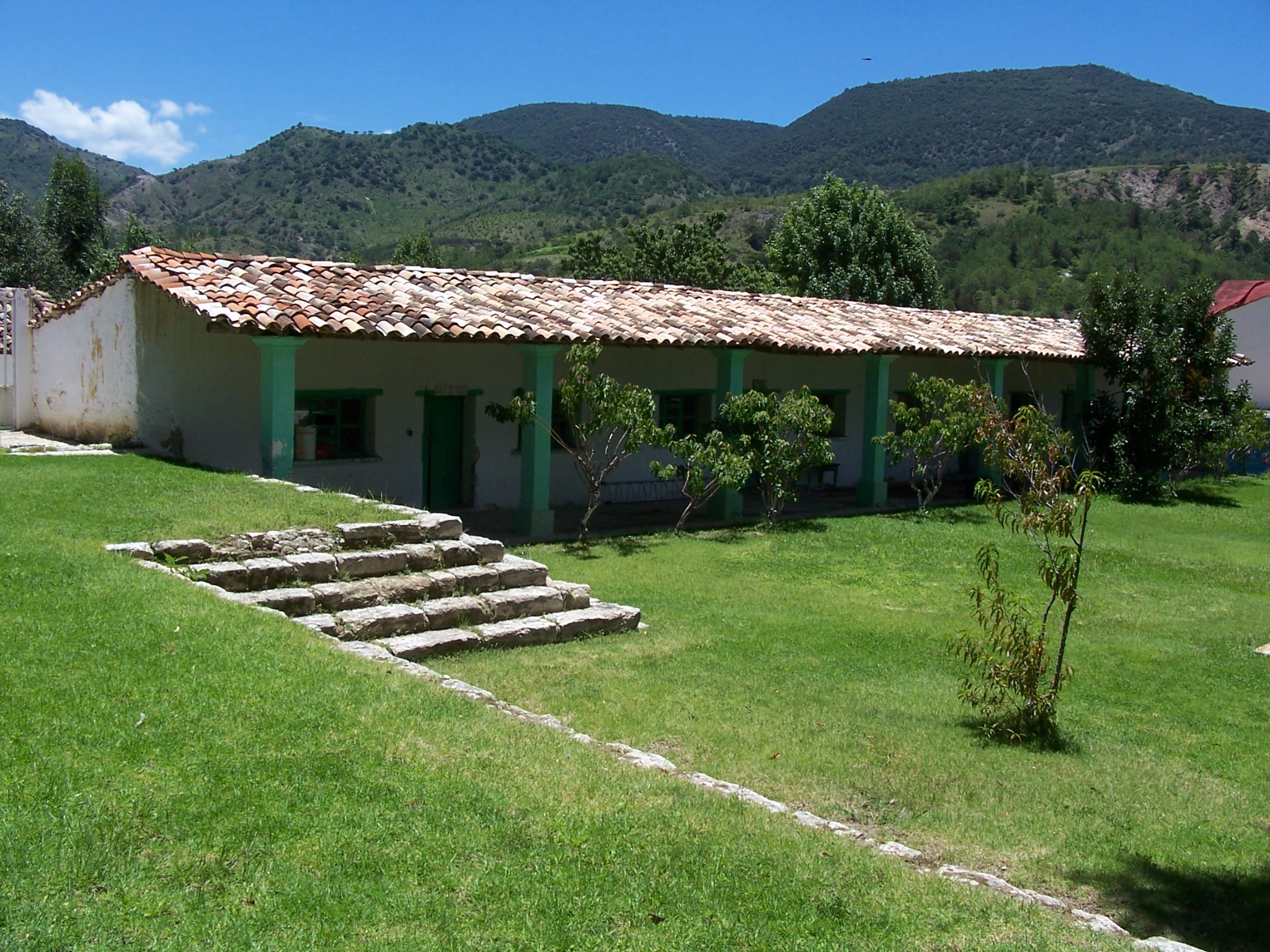
ancient classrooms of San Juan Achiutla (demolished in January 2011)

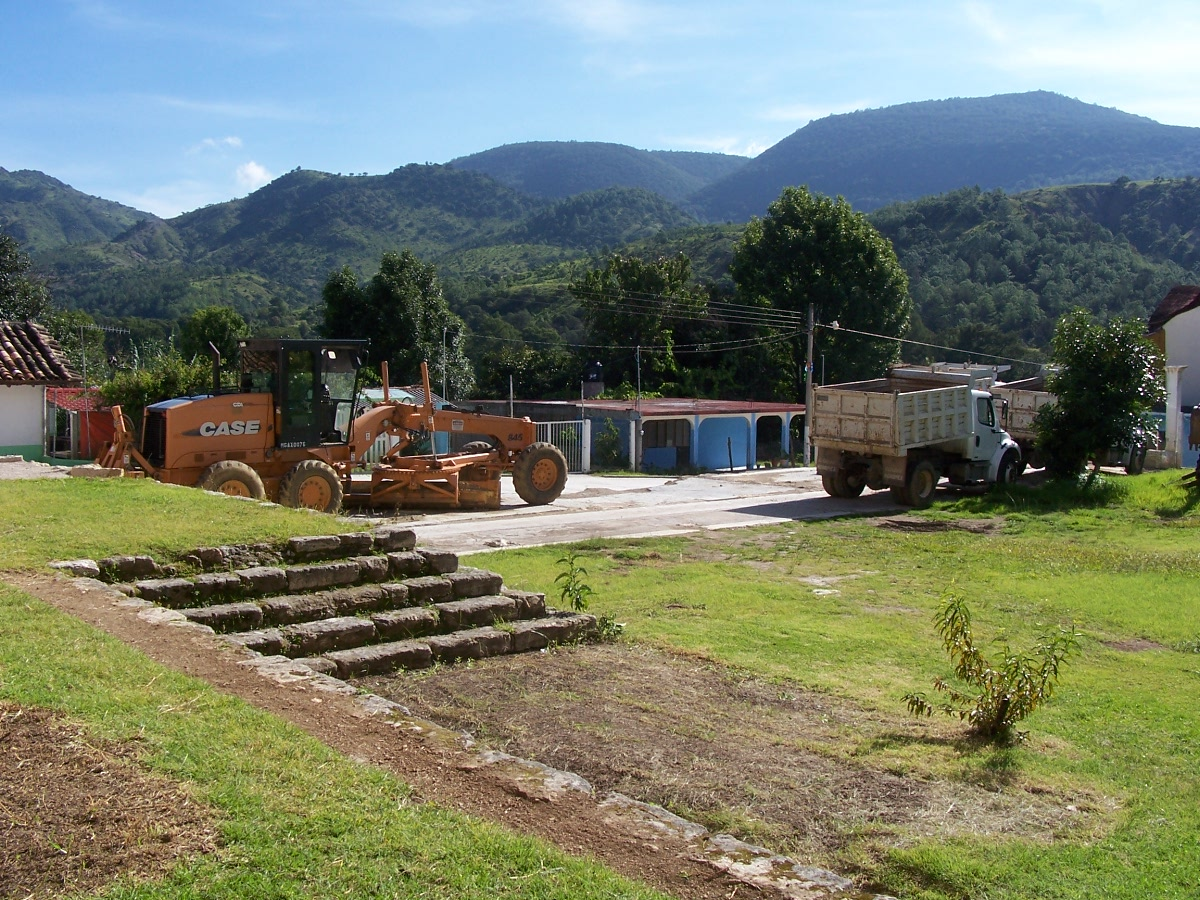
Same view in January 2011 without the old classrooms. San Juan Achiutla's historical, cultural and architectural heritage destruction

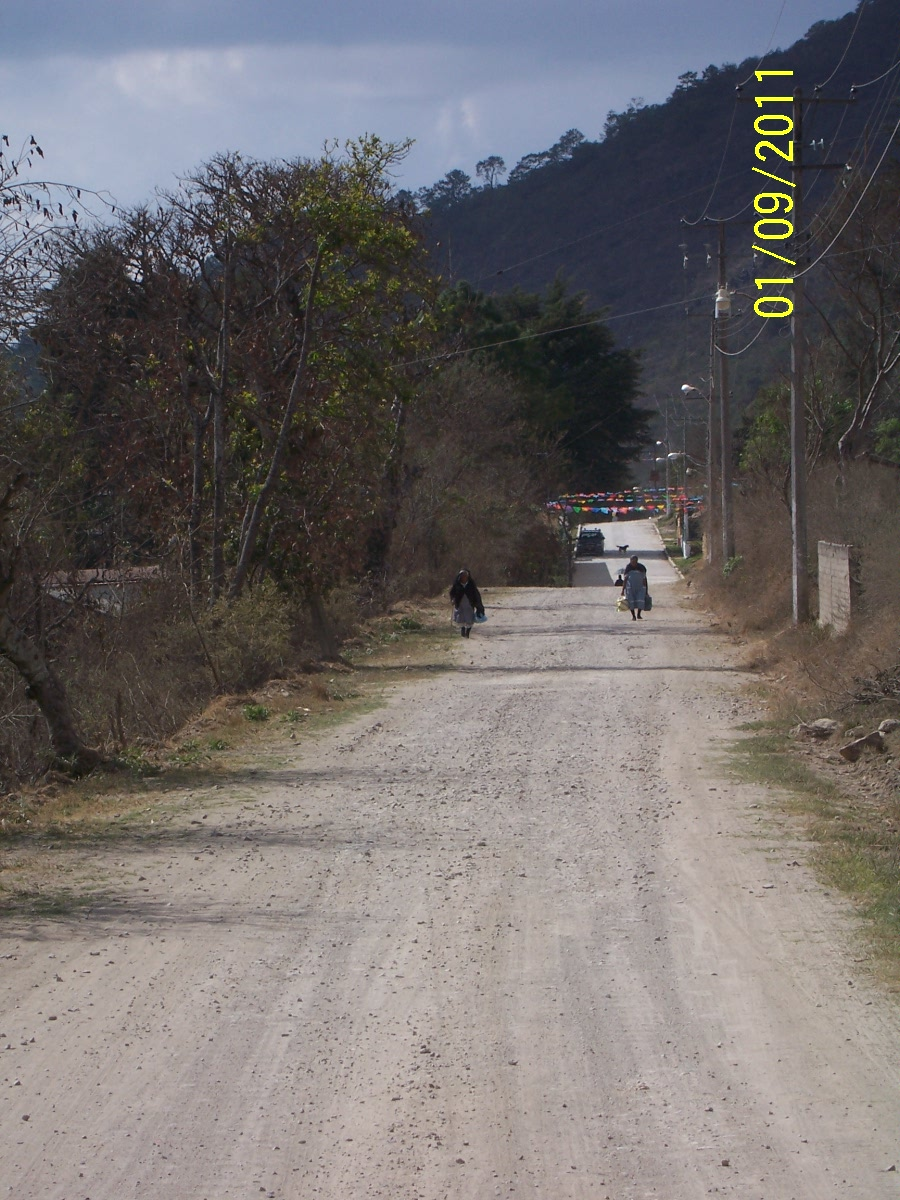
street of San Juan Achiutla

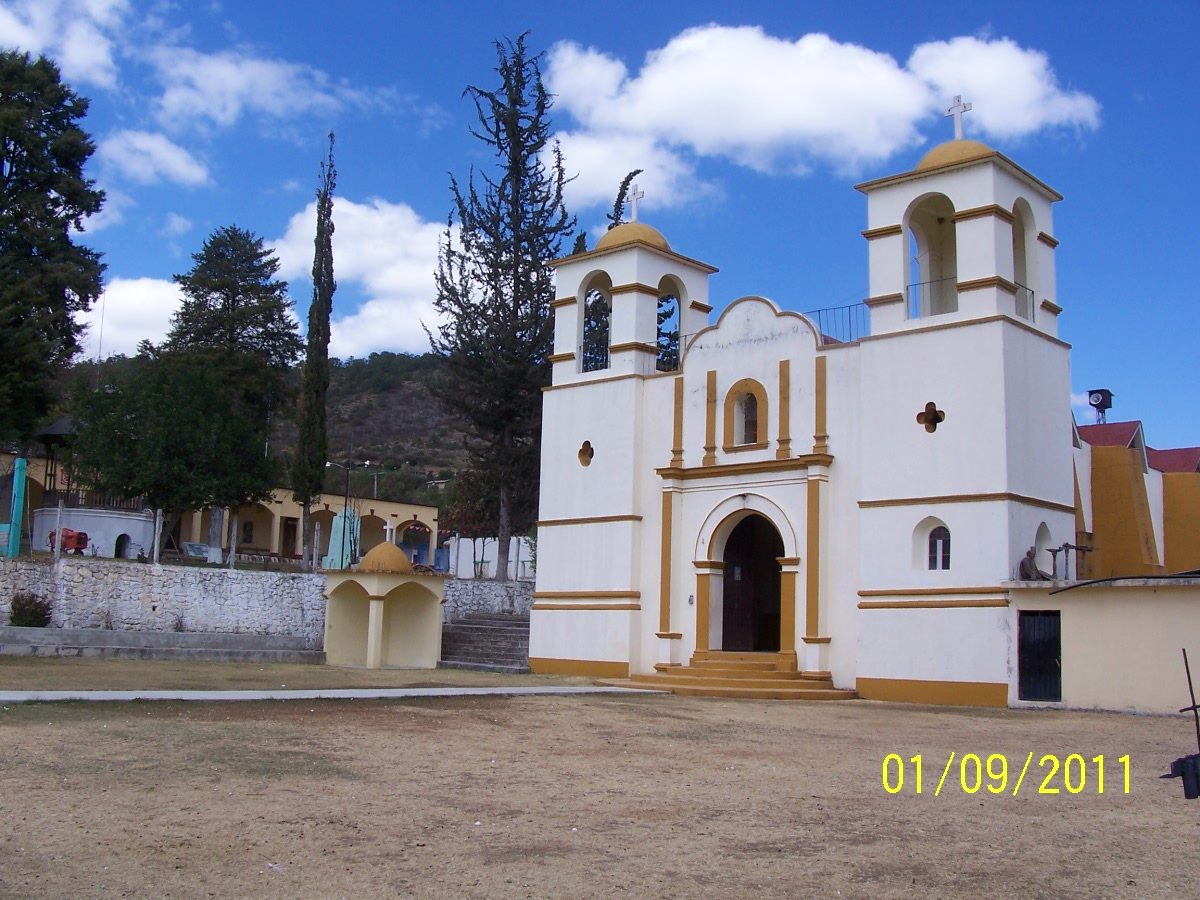
San Juan Evangelista church in San Juan Achiutla

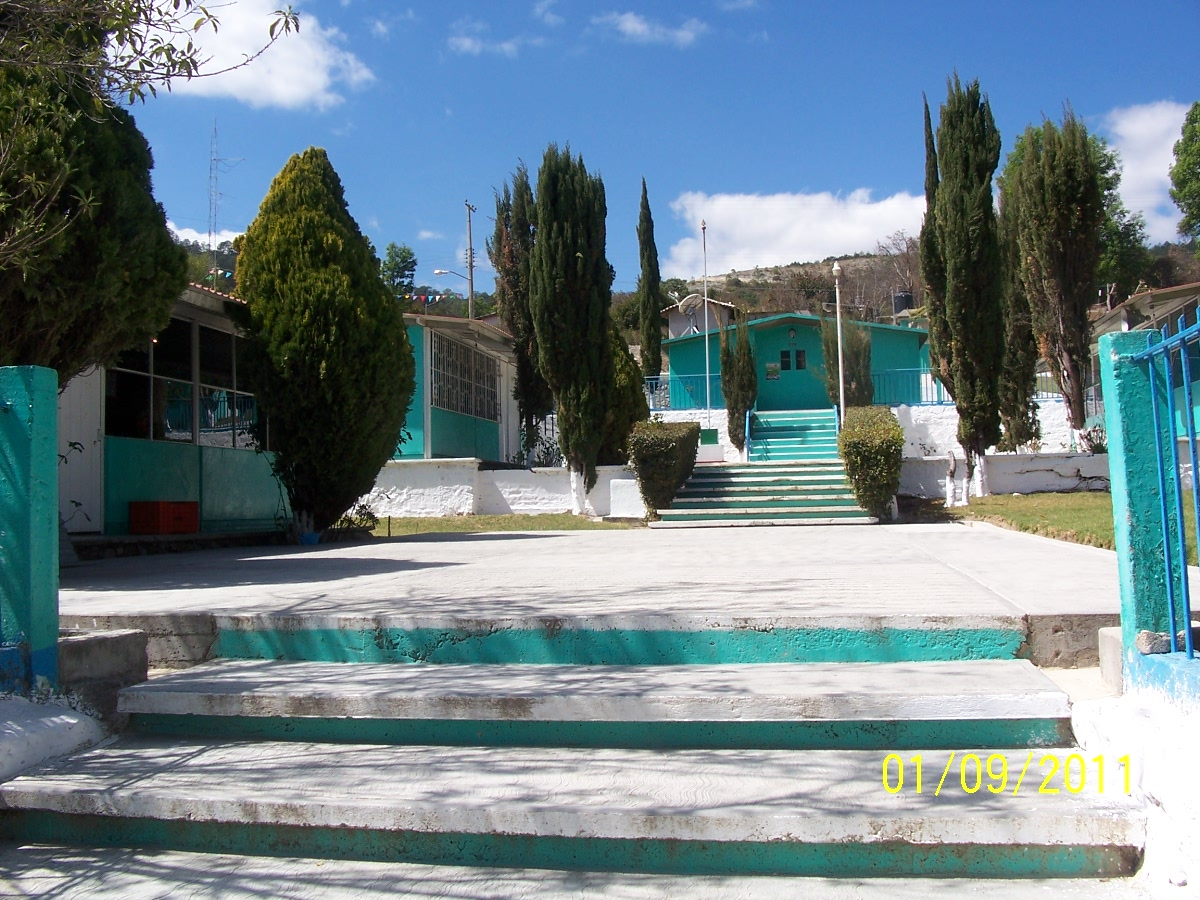
Francisco I. Madero primary school of San Juan Achiutla

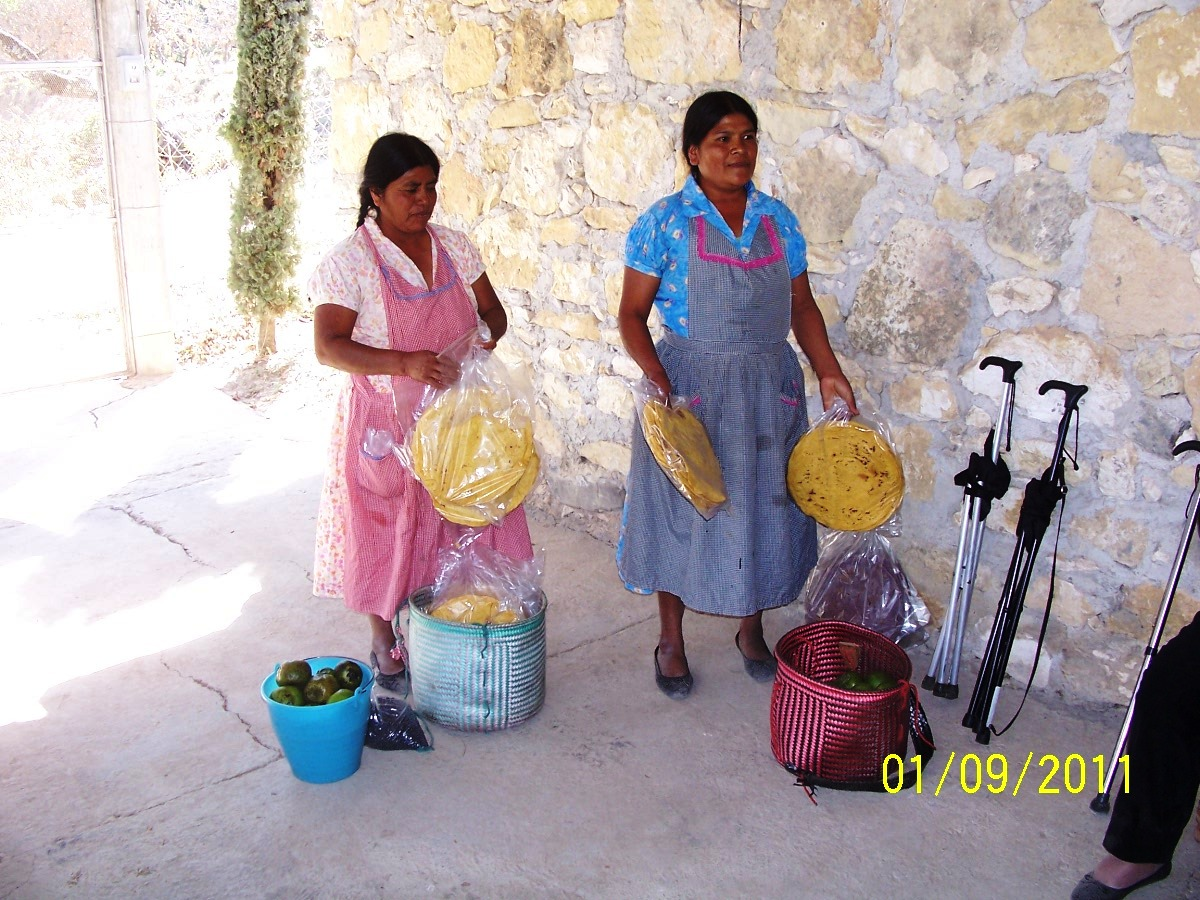
Tortillas and zapotes women sellers in San Juan Achiutla

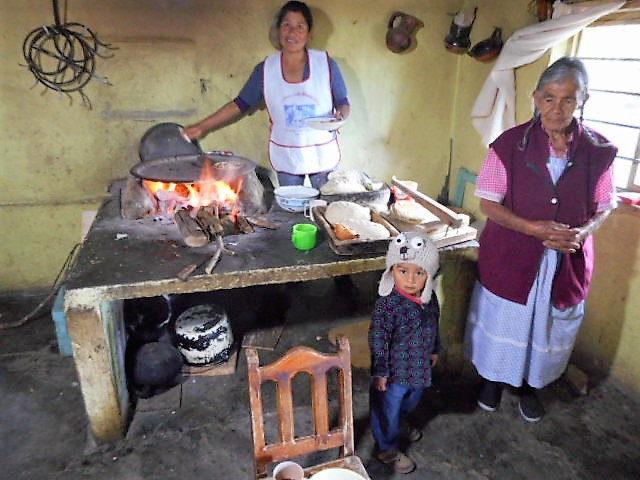
Traditional kitchen in San Juan Achiutla.

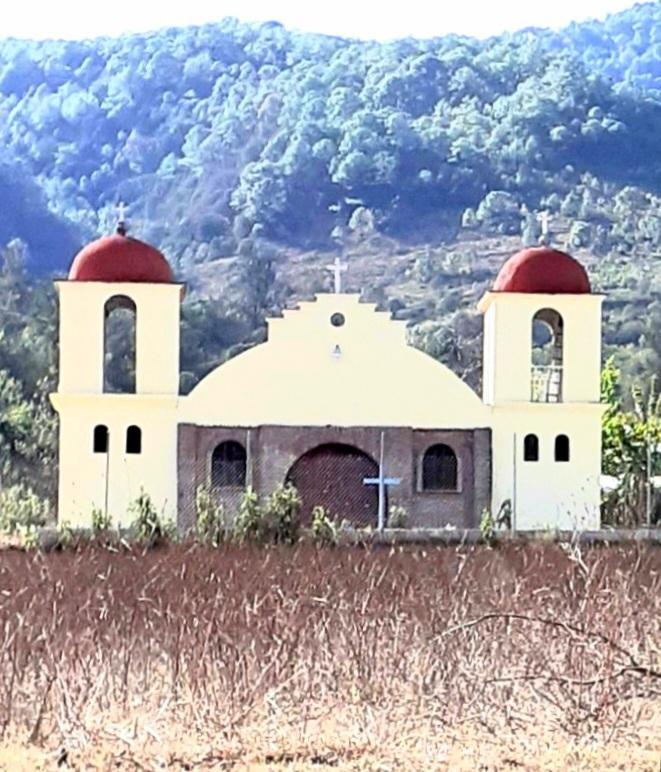
Barrio de Dolores' chapel

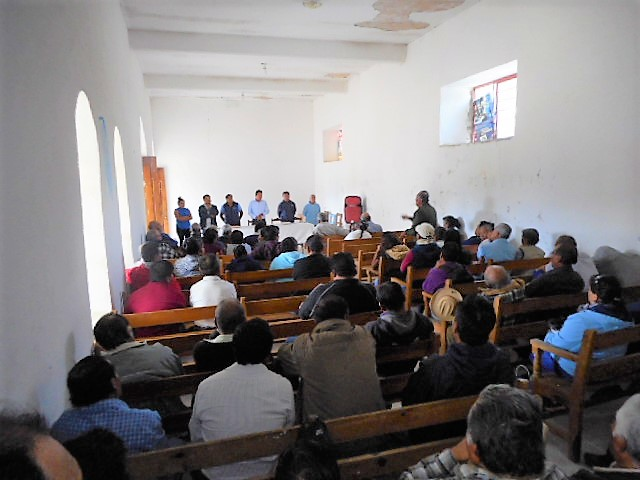
Municipal assembly in San Juan Achiutla, 2018

In 2010, Mexican Independence bicentennial and Mexican Revolution centennial year, appeared the book Camino por la Mixteca. Un testimonio y documentos para la microhistoria de San Juan Achiutla y la Mixteca Alta en el estado de Oaxaca Raúl Ruiz Bautista memoirs. Partially this book without being or pretending to be a site history, came to partially remedy the documents absence about San Juan Achiutla. For it we can retrieve some people and town events after the Mexican Revolution until 21st century first decade. San Juan history and the road Ixtapa - Tlacotepec construction are inseparable, Raúl Ruiz Bautista released his proclamation for their construction and San Juan Achiutla led the project and this road construction with Rutilio Ruiz Hernández to the head. The following are the relevant facts from the 20th century. 1920

- In the decade beginning in 1920, due to resources scarcity for families livelihood in San Juan Achiutla, peasants migrated to Río Blanco, Orizaba, Córdoba, Potrero Viejo, Santa Rosa and other places in Veracruz State, Mexico, to find work in the field and in factories, they got job in fabrics and yarns factories and Cervecería Moctezuma, brewery, or in the field collecting coffee, cutting cane or other agricultural work. Returning to the village especially to be on December 27 at the town's feast. Many of them were rooted in those populations for many years, some permanently.
- In 1929 it was built and established the first primary school where taught the teacher Rutilio Ruiz Hernández. One of the homes the school occupied was the premise and building called "La sala" owned by Bartolo Ruiz, who provided it for that purpose. This building no longer exists.

1930

- In 1935 the elementary school was converted into Rural Federal School Francisco I. Madero, being substituted Rutilio Ruiz Hernández as teacher by the professor Pedro Hernández, graduated from the Normal Rural School. At school existed only until the fourth grade.
- In 1936 the young Eliseo Ruiz López was carried by her father Tranquilino Ruiz to Normal Rural School of Cuilapan, near Oaxaca City to study for rural teacher, being the first to come out of San Juan Achiutla to study. So the San Juan Achiutla's Mayor, in an arbitrary way, decided to imprison and submit to penal labour Tranqulino his father with the claim that the boy did not was lose to the Catholic faith and return to the village to serve the municipality and to abandon his studies, which failed.
- In 1938 Raúl Ruiz Bautista and Natalio Ramírez Pérez left the town with the same goal, they were followed by many young people who would be teachers and professionals, employees in other parts of the country or in the United States of America.

1940

- On October 17, 1942, the municipality of San Juan Achiutla was established by presidential resolution.
- On October 28, 1942, the communal property of the community of San Juan Achiutla, of the San Juan Achiutla municipality, were titled by presidential resolution published in the Official Gazette of the Federation on March 3, 1943.
- The Municipal Palace was built in 1947 being Mayor Mr. Teodoro José.
- In August 1949 from San Juan Achiutla Raúl Ruiz Bautista launched its Road Manifesto calling for the towns of the region to the road San Felipe Ixtapa - San Agustín Tlacotepec construction in order to get out of backwardness, poverty and the isolation deprived High Mixteca towns. The Manifesto was endorsed by don Rutilio Ruiz Hernández, who became the leader and road construction organizer in the region while Raul Ruiz would be the negotiator of financial resources and contact with authorities, organizations and politicians in the country's capital, both during the fifteen years that would last its construction.
- The Regional Committee For the Ixtapa – Tlacotepec Road was founded in 1949; it organized the towns of this route during the entire period that lasted its construction, Rutilio Ruiz Hernández was named chairman of this committee.
- On October 15, 1949, the San José de Gracia authorities adhere to the Manifesto, the other towns of the route, Santo Tomás Tecolotitlán, Santa María Ndoayaco, San Sebastián Atoyaquillo, Santo Domingo Huendío and San Agustín Tlacotepec also would in due course, providing and at times to deny their collaboration for the construction. At the beginning, the work of the people was loaned free of charge as required by the Mexican Federal Government in their conventions, which provided one-third of its funding. After the first five years in which people worked for free, the workers were paid, though sparsely.
- In December 1949 were sent letters to the Roads National Committee General Secretary José Rivera R. To ask resources for the road's construction and in the same month to the Communications and Transport Secretary Lic. Agustín García López.

1950

- In 1950 at the request of Rutilio Ruiz Hernández from San Juan Achiutla, Chairman of the Regional Committee For the Ixtapa – Tlacotepec Road, several towns sent to the President of the Republic, Miguel Alemán Valdés, written to requesting resources for the road, neither the National Committee or the Secretariat of Communications had responded.
- In that same year Rutilio Ruiz Hernández was appointed general organizer of the Indigenous Congress in the Mixtec region.
- In January 1951 the Regional Committee For the Ixtapa – Tlacotepec Road requests the Oaxaca State Governor financial resources and his influence before the Federal Government to obtain it. Not importing applications repeated during the construction of the road, never received a satisfactory response from the Government of Oaxaca, only contributed with an amount equivalent to less than half a kilometre, its attention to the project was sent the requests for resources "to the corresponding area" where fell into a vacuum.
- 1951 San Juan Achiutla and the Mixtec Region were represented by Raúl Ruiz Bautista in the Second National Congress of the Confederation of Indigenous Young People in Mexico City. It was a Congress to try to incorporate indigenous organizations for purely political purposes, as reported Raúl recommending not participates in such organization.
- The Regional Committee of Indigenous Youth and Communities was founded in may, 1951 in San Juan Achiutla and designating San Juan Achiutla as the official seat of the Mixtec Regional Congress in the same year.
- On May 23, 1951, the Communications and Public Works Ministry orders the layout of the road but directs to the last section, the Huendío - Tlacotepec is not done: "still important not to carry out the last segment with Tlacotepec, pursuant to the expressed desire of does not arise on the short road, the vehicles in the region of Chalcatongo and trying to have as a forced via the Tlaxiaco City." (Note No. 324-RGB-1947, dossier 441.2 [727.2] / 5-1 folio 15362 signed by Manuel López sailing from Secretary of Communications an Public Works, to keep traffic on the long road, by Tlaxiaco, the path would be a long alley without exit, without connection to Yosondúa and Chalcatongo.
- In April 1951 the Regional Committee For the Ixtapa – Tlacotepec Road joins to the Coalition of Mixtec – Oaxacan Towns directed by Dr. Manuel Hernández Hernández, one of the major characters who due to his political position - Federal Deputy - help obtaining federal funds for the construction of the road.
- On October 6, 1951, was received in San Felipe Ixtapa the first set of tools and materials by the Federal Government to begin construction of the road, so the work began this month and year.
- San Juan Achiutla intervenes by Rutilio Ruiz Hernández in peacemaking, mediation and signing of the agreements of boundaries between San Miguel Achiutla and San Bartolomé Yucuañe, concluded between 1952 and 1953. Raúl Ruiz Bautista was responsible for the follow-up the legal settlement of the conflict in the Supreme Court of Justice in Mexico City at the request of Salvador Montes in representation of San Miguel Achiutla.
- In January 1953 through Rutilio Ruiz Hernández proposed to the National Indigenous Institute (INI, now National Commission for the Development of Indigenous Peoples) the establishment of an Indigenous Coordinating Centre in the Mixteca Alta, postulating as headquarters to San Miguel Achiutla. Such a centre was established in Tlaxiaco due to the community of San Miguel slow response to the INI.
- On May 3, 1953, the Vanguardia Progresista de San Juan Achiutla en el Distrito Federal, headed by Raúl Ruiz Bautista and other hard achiutlenses that would work to support their town with economic resources and materials for education and infrastructure, as well as for the annual Patron Saint festivities.
- In May 1954 Alfonso Caso, National Indigenous Institute general director visits the Mixteca Alta and decides to support the construction of the road.
- In August 1956 the Progressive Avant-garde of San Juan Achiutla in the Federal District identifies and invited 56 migrant achiutlenses in the State of Veracruz, to integrate an autonomous organization similar to the Progressive Avant-garde in the region of Río Blanco and surrounding cities and towns, and systematically raise funds and send them to the municipality as a support for the town's development of public works and community services. Those, instigated by traditional leaders focused on supporting only the religious festivals, didn't accept.
- On October 12, 1956, was open the telephone network in San Miguel Tixá and San Juan Achiutla was also connected to the telephone service.
- In that year, after repeated requests from the Regional Committee For the Ixtapa - Tlacotepec Road, would begin the pay of a basic wage to workers in the road, residents of the towns, as came doing it free for nearly five years, as required (the provision of free labor by towns) by the National Committee on Community roads in their conventions.
- In 1958 it was built the Post Office and telephone at San Juan Achiutla, same year in which started the construction of the first basketball court in the town (of rammed earth) both with the economic support of the Progressive Avant-Garde of San Juan Achiutla in Mexico City. This organization processed before the Ministry of Public Education the backboards and goals donation.

1960

- In 1961 begins the potable water system construction and its introduction in this town, for which the municipality requested and obtained financial backing from Vanguardia Progresista. Installs the first electricity generator in the town. Builds the first potable water tank in El Calvario spot. Desiderio López José presided the municipality then.
- October 26, 1961, through the Vanguardia Progresista intermediary and personally Raúl Ruiz Bautista before the Public Education Ministry, Francisco I. Madero primary school receives a substantial provision of furniture and materials: highlighted 125 chair desks, one vertical file, three desks, a microscope, a typewriter, a national flag, three basketball balls and six national heroes portraits, which today it may seem insignificant, but that it was not for a rural primary school at the time.
- In 1962 was held in San Juan Achiutla first meeting Educational Area School Number 18. In November of that year there was a conflict between the priest attending to celebrate mass at San Juan and the Regional Committee For the Ixtapa – Tlacotepec Road, because tool and machinery for construction were temporarily stored in the parish of the town.
- On March 18, 1963, Dr. Alfonso Caso, the Indigenous National Institute Chairman visited San Juan Achiutla with Dr. Manuel Hernández Hernández to inaugurate the way Ixtapa - Tlacotepec after 15 years Manifesto launching for its construction. It was also the formal opening ceremony of the drinking water system, electricity generator and the repaired school classrooms (classrooms that were demolished “to expand the garden” between the Church and the municipal Palace in February 2011, actually is a machinery parking lot). In that year was built the Monument to the Flag.
- In December 1963, for the San Juan Achiutla's feast, Vanguardia Progresiva de San Juan Achiutla in Mexico City, on the initiative of Jesús A. Ruiz Sanchez, made the gift of the first turntable and sound system to the municipality of San Juan Achiutla.
- In June 1964 the Education Ministry gave 35 chair desks for the elementary school.
- In August 1965 the music band was reorganized and acquired two saxophones to reinforce it.
- In November 1965, school census, attending primary school 130 boys and 135 girls, there were six teachers (in 2011 the actual population of the town did not reach the 200 people). Took inventory of the resources of primary school. Classrooms were again repaired.
- On November 19, 1965, a tribute was held in Mexico City for Ixtapa - Tlacotepec road construction to Dr. Alfonso Caso, Dr, Manuel Hernández Hernández, Eng. Miguel García Cruz (absent in the event), Dr. Gonzalo Aguirre Beltrán and Eng. Adrián Breña Garduño. Don Rutilio Ruiz Hernández was awarded with a gold medal. The speech was in charge of Raúl Ruiz Bautista.
- Wednesday, June 7, 1967, Carteles del Sur, a newspaper of Oaxaca City published a María del Refugio G. de Alva article entitled El Camino de don Rutilio (Don Rutilio's road) where extensively was portrayed the leader's struggle for the road.
- In 1969 the construction of the electric network was initiated in San Juan Achiutla.

1970

- In 1971 the dam for agricultural irrigation Las Lajas was built in the course of the river Los Sabinos.
- In 1975, the second drinking water tank was built in El Jazmin spot.
- In 1977 Raúl Ruiz Bautista wrote to the State of Oaxaca Governor, general Eliseo Jiménez Ruiz, to return the buses run by the road Ixtapa - Tlacotepec from the Mexico City and Oaxaca City to Chalcatongo de Hidalgo, which already operated and were suspended, being that the short route to Tlacotepec and Yosondúa. He also asked for paving the road. It has not returned to have regular runs of buses on this route.
- The third tank of drinking water in the El Moral spot was built in 1978.
- The rural clinic under the programme IMSS - COPLAMAR, was built in 1979 when the municipal president was Mr. Juan Santos.

1980

- In 1980 the Federal Secondary School Eng. Alfonso Martínez Berges was established in San Juan Achiutla.
- In 1984, the first public telephone service Telmex was installed.
- On July 26, 1986, Raúl Ruiz Bautista wrote twice to the then Senator Heladio Ramírez López, already elected Oaxaca's Governor, suggested him to include in his Government's actions plan the road Ixtapa - Tlacotepec paving, and the Colegio Nacional de Educación Profesional Técnica (Conalep) creation in San Juan Achiutla, the drainage introduction, a market and a municipal house construction as well as the cooperative industry for the exploitation of limestone and other construction materials creation to create sources of employment and entrench the inhabitants of the Mixteca on their land. He returned to writing in May 1988 insisting on these subjects and the introduction of public passenger transport. There were no results.
- Between 1988 and 1989 the three domes of the Church of St. John the Evangelist were built.

1990

- The fourth drinking water tank was built in San Pedro neighbourhood in 1991.
- On 25 January 1993 Raúl Ruiz Bautista wrote to Diodoro Carrasco Altamirano Governor of the State requesting the necessary expansion and paving of the Ixtapa - Tlacotepec road.
- The Mixteco Towns Union, chaired by Professor Neftalí Ruiz Sánchez, San Juan Achiutla's Mayor, was created in 1993 who scheduled in its work programme the expansion and paving of the road Ixtapa - Tlacotepec.
- On 5 November 1993, Professor Neftalí Ruiz Sánchez summarizes that he has sent two separate letters, one to the President of the Republic, Carlos Salinas de Gortari, other to the Oaxaca's Governor and to the Planning Development Committee of the State of Oaxaca (Coplades) requesting the road's extension and paving, without any result. In February 1994 he wrote to the Secretary of Communications and Transport and the Governor of Oaxaca, with zero results.
- On 2 February 1995, the route Ixtapa - Tlacotepec mayors headed by Neftalí Ruiz Sánchez wrote to the President of the Republic, Ernesto Zedillo Ponce de León asking the road paving.
- In the same year the fifth drinking water tank in El Ocote was put in service.
- Between 1996 and 1998 a channel, two barriers and four reservoirs for irrigation water storage were built, being President Juan Pablo López.

2000

- 2004 the Instituto de Estudios de Bachillerato del Estado de Oaxaca (IEBO) campus 126 "Achiutla" was established among San Juan Achiutla, San Miguel Achiutla and San Sebastián Atoyaquillo, in order to provide to several towns educational service. It has three classrooms and seven computers in 2010 with Internet service.
- In 2008 began the delivery of public Internet services in San Juan Achiutla in private establishing "The Grandfather's House".

2010

- Starts the streets paved and construction of sidewalks on the main street of the village.
- In September, 2010 in the National Commission for development of indigenous Peoples in Mexico City and in December of that same year in San Juan Achiutla and Tlaxiaco, is presented the book Camino por la Mixteca. Un testimonio y documentos para la microhistoria de San Juan Achiutla y la Mixteca Alta del Estado de Oaxaca. Raúl Ruiz Bautista Memoirs.
- The old classrooms of elementary school in San Juan Achiutla, ancient “adobe” constructions and part of the town cultural heritage were demolished, the ground is used as machinery parking lot. This was a cultural heritage destruction municipal action.
- In the 2010-2011 the number of pupils attending primary school is 27, secondary school 31, and Achiutla IEBO pre college level is 84. Total 142 students in the locality, taking into account the Achiutla IEBO attend not only students from San Juan but also joined 12 students from the Guadalupe Hidalgo's IEBO which was closed due to students' lack), of San Miguel Achiutla, San Sebastián Atoyaquillo and other villages. As more above has been said, in 1965 when only primary school worked, it had 285 students, more than double that the total in 2011.
- Until 2011 the road Ixtapa - Tlacotepec ranging from Ixtapa to San Juan Achiutla (town called and led its construction) remains without be paved, meanwhile long route the "obligated" Tlaxiaco pass, was paved long time ago.
- In July, 2011, as a result and in follow-up to the Raúl Ruiz Bautista´s work, was published in Wikipedia, la enciclopedia libre, the first article on San Juan Achiutla, who initiates the recovery of identity and cultural and historical memory of the place, its inhabitants, migrants and their descendants, many of them Mixtec born in other parts of the country and abroad. In January 2012, the English translation was published in Wikipedia, the Free Encyclopedia.

== Cultural and historical heritage ==
There are as goods of cultural and historical heritage of San Juan Achiutla:

- Achiutla Pre-Hispanic site and San Miguel Arcángel Dominican Convent, for have been the pre-Hispanic City of Achiutla the place that gave birth to San Miguel Achiutla as to San Juan Achiutla, none in the original space although San Miguel next to the original site.
- St. John the Evangelist Church.
- 18th-century oil paintings collection in the St. John the Evangelist Church.

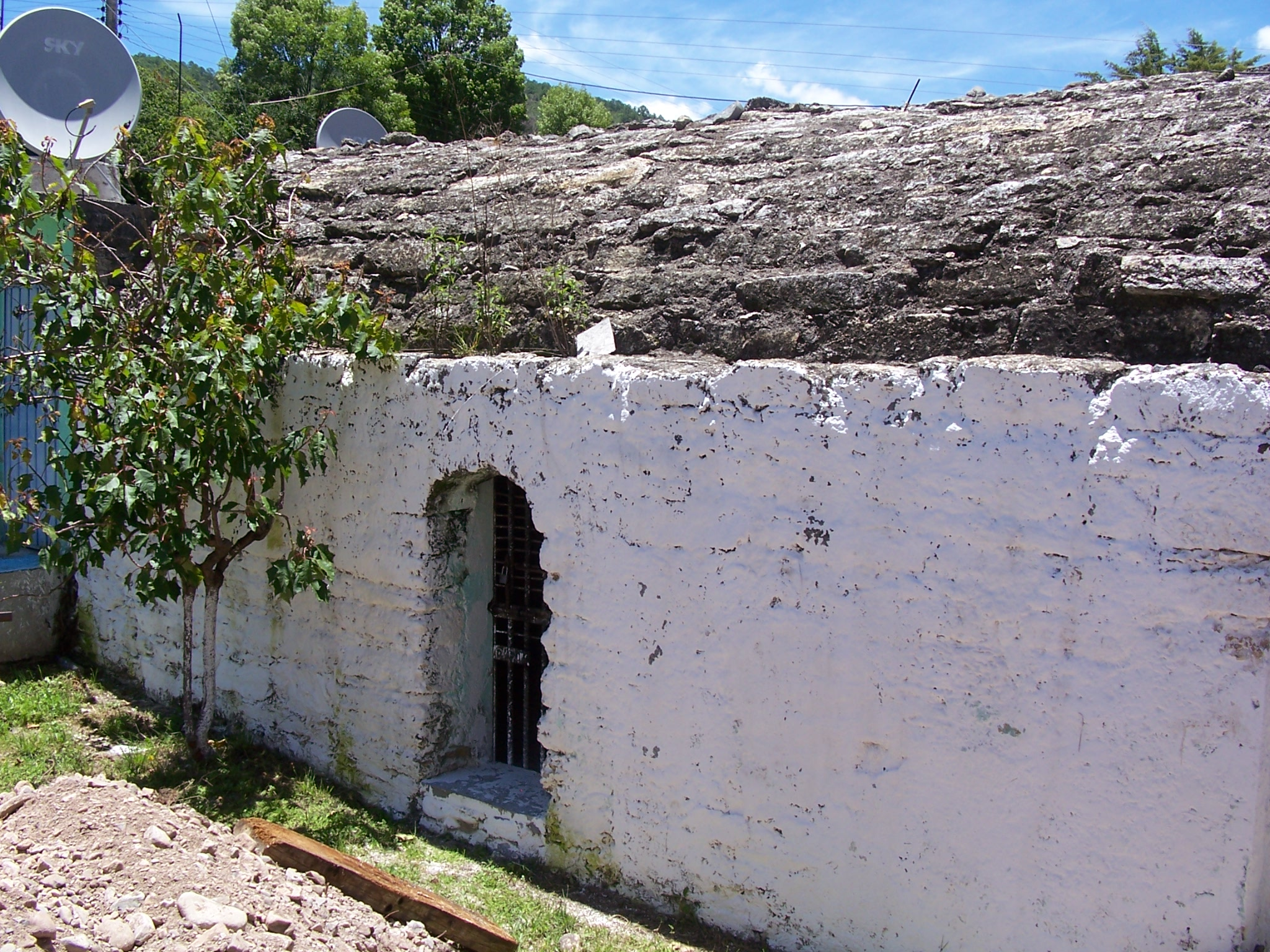
Jail of San Juan Achiutla

- "El chorrito" drinking water box
- The prison and the municipal buildings adjacent to it.
- The Municipal Palace
- The kiosk in the front garden at City Hall.
- The monument to the flag.
- The book Camino por la Mixteca. Un testimonio y documentos para la microhistoria de San Juan Achiutla y la Mixteca Alta en el estado de Oaxaca. Raúl Ruiz Bautista, published in 2010 and graded as high relevance by the library of the Congress of the United States.

== Cultural traditions ==
The Mixtec culture, to which San Juan Achiutla and the achiutlecos belong, is a living culture, says Ronald Spores on the subject:

After the independence war the language ñu savi (Ñuu Dzaui) speakers retained their ethnic identity, their customs, and managed to adapt to the circumstances of the new country, initially in the Mixteca and eventually beyond: in Puebla, the central valleys, the North and Northwest Mexico; at present, can be found Mixtec everywhere in North America. This group tenacity and adaptability for more than 3,000 years deserves everyone's attention.

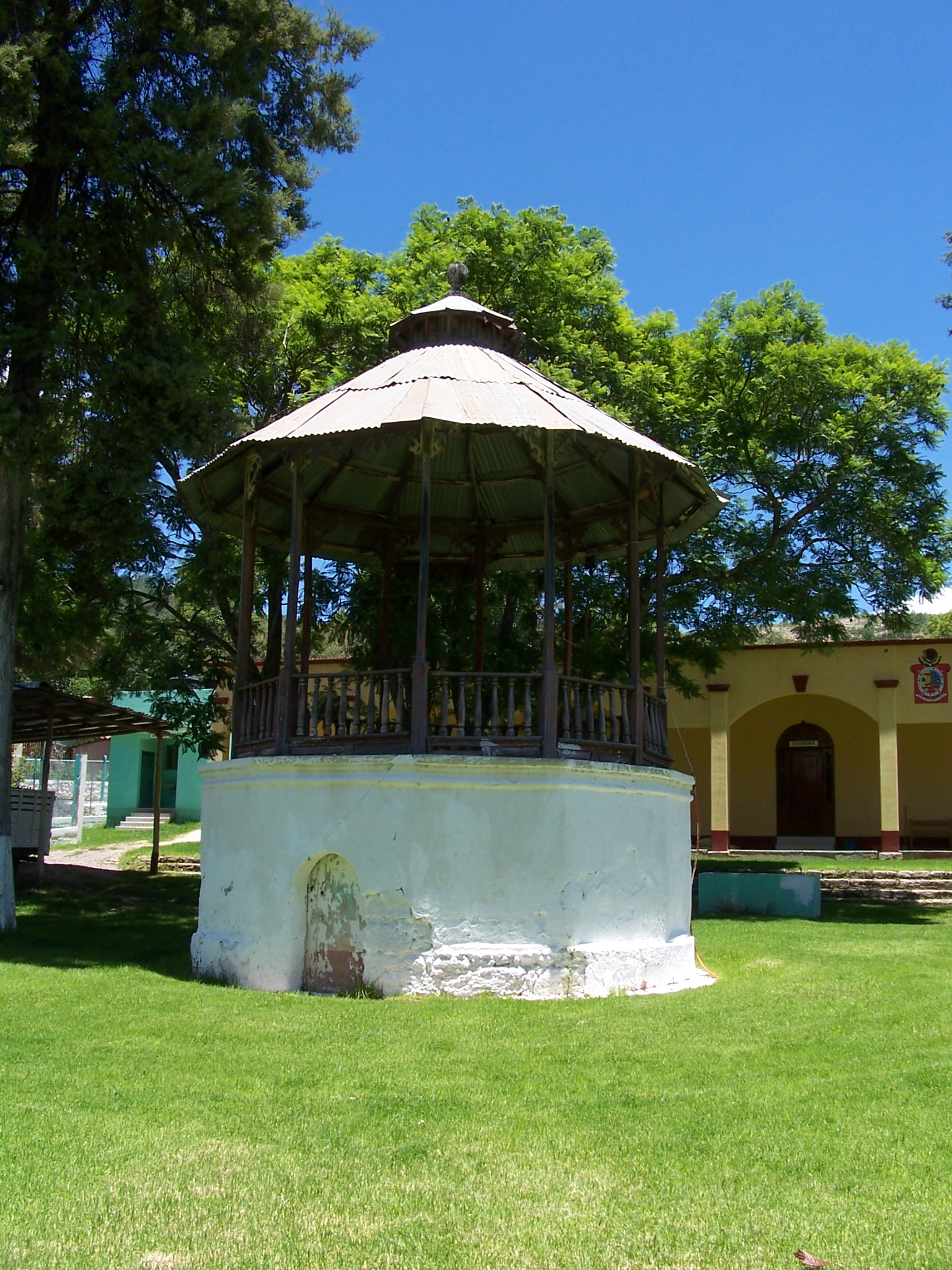
Kiosk of San Juan Achiutla (demolished)

The Mixtec culture has developed and maintained for more than three millennia in a vast region which covers a territory of 40,000 km^{2} (15,000 sq mi), which extends from South of Puebla to the Pacific coast and the Valley of Oaxaca to the East of Guerrero. The Mixteca region comprises three ecological zones: the High Mixteca ―escenario of the development of the main towns of this culture―, the Low Mixteca ―o Ñuiñe ("Tierra Caliente") — and the Mixteca de la Costa.
We must remember that the Mixtec culture did not disappear with the conquest, during the colonial period, or in the 19th and 20th centuries radical national transformations. It exists today in the Mixteca, everywhere in Mexico and anywhere in the world where the Mixtecs have reached in its vast adaptation diaspora. Many have left the Mixteca, but their hearts, thoughts and feelings remain on their land and their tradition.
As reflected in La Canción Mixteca (a lyric) among multiple ethnic groups that form the Mexican Republic, perhaps the nation more sentimental, nostalgic and loyal to its roots is the ñu savi, the Mixtec nation.

Following ancient cultural traditions are preserved in San Juan Achiutla:

- The tequio, which is obligatory work as contribution to the town public works and services, that allows the people and the municipality to be clean and healthy place in an exemplary fashion.
- The gueza (guelaguetza, give to receive) which is mutual support mainly in supplies or in cash between neighbors and relatives that bring to those who have a celebration, feast or compromise, such as weddings, baptisms, funerals or mayordomías. The gueza reception is a solemn ceremony in which small speeches are addressed to deliver and receive the contributions, being a usual commitment to spontaneously to reciprocate the help at the moment in which the counterpart need it.
- The mayordomía which is the responsibility of an individual for the celebration of the Patron Saint San Juan fest, this custom however is of great economic burden for those who assume it.
- The posadas are the festivities during eight days leading up to Christmas. Consist of put the nacimiento, give Posada to the pilgrims, with images of the pilgrims Mary and Joseph in a procession calling the Inn to the house inhabitants, who give after prayers and doubts, they offer to the pilgrims and the procession hot drinks, tamales, collations, gifts, breaking piñatas, pray the Rosary.
- The pastorela of the town, staging Christmas performed with volunteer actors of the town prior to Christmas.
- The danza del guajolote (Turkey dance), in which the salient mayordomo delivered a turkey as a gift through dancers to the new mayordomo.
- The música de viento (wind music band) of both religious and social present at every party.
- The pre-Hispanic legend of El flechador del sol which Achiutla is mentioned.

== Bibliography ==
- Ruiz Bautista. Raúl. Camino por la Mixteca. Un testimonio y documentos para la microhistoria de San Juan Achiutla y la Mixteca Alta en el estado de Oaxaca Mexico 2010, 295 pp. ISBN 978 - 607-00-3376-6 http://lccn.loc.gov/2010538507
- Pérez Ortiz, Alfoso. Pueblo en llamas, la inobediencia de los mixtecos de Achiutla en el siglo XVI. Thesis for the degree of m.a. in history. Universidad Nacional Autónoma Mexico. 2009.
- Diguet. Léon, Contribution a l'Etude geographique du mexique précolombien. Le Mixtecapan Journal de la Société des américanistes de Paris. Nouvelle series. Tome III. Au sige de la Société. 61, Rue de Buffon, 61. France 1906.
- Hermann Lejarazu. Manuel A. Códice Yucunama. Edición facsimilar, interpretación y Análisis. Centre for Research and Higher Studies in Social Anthropology. CIESAS. Mexico. 1st Edition, Mexico, 2009. ISBN 978-607-486-042-9
- Jansen, Maarten and Pérez Jiménez, Gabina Aurora. Paisajes sagrados: códices y arqueología de Ñuu Dzaui. Itineraries Vol. 8 / 2008 ISSN paper version: 1507–7241, University of Warsaw. Iberian and Latin American Studies Institute. Oboźna 8, 00-927 Warsaw.
- Maarten E.R.G.N. Jansen Huisi Tacu, volume II. CEOLA. Incidentele Publicaties 24. Katholieke Universiteit Leuven. Leuven University. Belgium.
- Spores. Ronald, La Mixteca y los mixtecos. 3,000 años de adaptación cultural. Arqueología Mexicana. Bi-Monthly Magazine, March–April 2008. Volume XV, number 90. México.
- San Juan Achiutla's Municipality, in Enciclopedia de los Municipios de México National Institute for Federalism and Municipal Development, Interior Ministry, Mexico.
- San Juan Achiutla's Municipality Plan Municipal de Desarrollo de San Juan Achiutla 2008 - 2010.
