= Punta de Choros Metamorphic Complex =

Rock types

- Stratigraphic range: Carboniferous–Permian
- Type: Complex

Lithology
- Primary: Micaschist
- Other: Greenschist

Location
- Region: Atacama Region
- Country: Chile

Type section
- Named for: Punta de Choros

The Punta de Choros Metamorphic Complex is a large coherent group of metamorphic rocks –in other words a geologic complex– of the Chilean Coast Range in northern Chile. It consists mainly of micaschists, greenschists and other low-grade metasediment. The complex was formed by the metamorphism of sediments and associated mafic rocks at the interface between a subducting plate and the overriding plate.
