= San Juan del Río, Oaxaca =

San Juan del Río
- Municipality and town
- Location in Mexico San Juan del Río (Mexico)
- Coordinates: 16°53′N 96°09′W
- Country: Mexico
- State: Oaxaca

Area
  - Total: 94.73 km^{2} (36.58 sq mi)
- Elevation: 1,128 m (3,701 ft)

Population (2020)
  - Total: 1,370
- Time zone: UTC-6 (Zona Centro)
- Postal code: 70470

San Juan del Río is a town and municipality in Oaxaca in southern Mexico. The municipality covers an area of 94.73 km^{2}. It is part of the Tlacolula District in the east of the Valles Centrales Region.

As of 2020, the municipality had a total population of 1370 inhabitants.

== Geography ==
San Juan del Río belongs to the Tlacolula district to which belongs a total of 25 communities. It is located in the Central Valleys region of Oaxaca, in the state's center. The municipality had in 2020 (last census of the INEGI) 1370 inhabitants. Of these there were 650 men and 720 women. San Juan del Río is at 1,128 meters of altitude.
