= San Juan County =

San Juan County is the name of four counties in the United States:

- San Juan County, Colorado
- San Juan County, New Mexico
- San Juan County, Utah
- San Juan County, Washington
