= ISO 639:c =

List of ISO 639-3 language codes starting with C

This is a list of ISO 639-3 language codes starting with C.

Index | a | b | c | d | e | f | g | h | i | j | k | l | m | n | o | p | q | r | s | t | u | v | w | x | y | z

Abbreviations are used in the table as follows:

- Scope: I = individual language, M = macrolanguage, S = special code
- Type: C = constructed, E = extinct (in recent times), H = historical (distinct from its modern form), L = living, S = special code

Deprecated codes are enclosed in (parentheses).

The column Family contains the generic English name of the language's family or macrolanguage.

ISO 639 codes			Scope/Type	Family	Language names	
639-3	639-1	639-2/B	Scope/Type	Family	Native	ISO name
caa			I/L	Mayan	čorti'	Chortí
cab			I/L	Arawakan		Garifuna
cac			I/L	Mayan		Chuj
cad		cad	I/L	Caddoan	Hasí:nay	Caddo
cae			I/L	Niger-Congo		Laalaa; Lehar
caf			I/L	Dené-Yeniseian	ᑕᗸᒡ	Southern Carrier
cag			I/L	Matacoan		Nivaclé
cah			I/L	Zaparoan		Cahuarano
caj			I/E	Arawakan		Chané
cak			I/L	Mayan		Cakchiquel; Kaqchikel
cal			I/L	Austronesian		Carolinian
cam			I/L	Austronesian		Cemuhî
can			I/L	Ramu-Lower Sepik		Chambri
cao			I/L	Panoan		Chácobo
cap			I/L	Uru-Chipaya		Chipaya
caq			I/L	Austroasiatic		Car Nicobarese
car		car	I/L	Cariban		Galibi Carib
cas			I/L	Moseten-Chonan		Tsimané
cat	ca	cat	I/L	Indo-European	català	Catalan; Valencian
cav			I/L	Pano-Tacanan		Cavineña
caw			I/L	mixed: Puquina and Quechua		Callawalla
cax			I/L	isolate		Chiquitano
cay			I/L	Iroquian	Goyogo̱hó:nǫ’	Cayuga
caz			I/E	Tequiraca-Canichana		Canichana
cbb			I/L	Arawakan		Cabiyarí
cbc			I/L	Tucanoan		Carapana
cbd			I/L	Cariban	Tsahá	Carijona
(cbe)			I/E	spurious language		Chipiajes
cbg			I/L	Chibchan		Chimila
(cbh)			I/E	spurious language		Cagua
cbi			I/L	Barbarcoan		Chachi
cbj			I/L	Niger-Congo		Ede Cabe
cbk			I/L	Spanish-based creole		Chavacano
cbl			I/L	Sino-Tibetan		Bualkhaw Chin
(cbm)			I/L	Mayan		Yepocapa Southwestern Cakchiquel
cbn			I/L	Austroasiatic		Nyahkur
cbo			I/L	Niger-Congo		Izora
cbq			I/L	Niger–Congo		Cuba; Tsucuba
cbr			I/L	Panoan		Cashibo-Cacataibo
cbs			I/L	Panoan		Cashinahua
cbt			I/L	Cahuapanan		Chayahuita
cbu			I/L	isolate		Candoshi-Shapra
cbv			I/L	Puinave-Maku		Cacua
cbw			I/L	Austronesian		Kinabalian
cby			I/L	Ticuna-Yuri		Carabayo
(cca)			I/E	spurious language		Cauca
ccc			I/L			Chamicuro
ccd			I/L			Cafundo Creole
cce			I/L			Chopi
ccg			I/L			Samba Daka
cch			I/L			Atsam
ccj			I/L			Kasanga
ccl			I/L			Cutchi-Swahili
ccm			I/L			Malaccan Creole Malay
cco			I/L			Comaltepec Chinantec
ccp			I/L			Chakma
(ccq)			I/L			Chaungtha
ccr			I/E			Cacaopera
(ccx)			I/L			Northern Zhuang
(ccy)			I/L			Southern Zhuang
cda			I/L			Choni
cde			I/L	Dravidian	చెంచు	Chenchu
cdf			I/L			Chiru
(cdg)			I/L	spurious language		Chamari
cdh			I/L			Chambeali
cdi			I/L			Chodri
cdj			I/L			Churahi
cdm			I/L			Chepang
cdn			I/L			Chaudangsi
cdo			I/L	Sino-Tibetan	閩東語/闽东语	Min Dong Chinese
cdr			I/L			Cinda-Regi-Tiyal
cds			I/L			Chadian Sign Language
cdy			I/L			Chadong
cdz			I/L			Koda
cea			I/E			Lower Chehalis
ceb		ceb	I/L		S(in)ugboanon	Cebuano
ceg			I/L			Chamacoco
cek			I/L			Eastern Khumi Chin
cen			I/L	Niger–Congo?	Izarek	Cen
ces	cs	cze	I/L	Indo-European	čeština	Czech
cet			I/L	language isolate		Centúúm
cey			I/L	Sino-Tibetan		Ekai Chin
cfa			I/L			Dijim-Bwilim
cfd			I/L			Cara
cfg			I/L			Como Karim
cfm			I/L	Sino-Tibetan	Lai ṭong	Falam Chin
cga			I/L			Changriwa
cgc			I/L			Kagayanen
cgg			I/L			Chiga
cgk			I/L			Chocangacakha
cha	ch	cha	I/L	Austronesian	Chamoru	Chamorro
chb		chb	I/E			Chibcha
chc			I/E		Iyeye	Catawba
chd			I/L			Highland Oaxaca Chontal
che	ce	che	I/L	Northeast Caucasian	нохчийн	Chechen
chf			I/L			Tabasco Chontal
chg		chg	I/E		جغتای	Chagatai
chh			I/E			Chinook
chj			I/L			Ojitlán Chinantec
chk		chk	I/L			Chuukese
chl			I/L			Cahuilla
chm		chm	M/L		марий	Mari (Russia)
chn		chn	I/L		chinuk wawa	Chinook jargon
cho		cho	I/L		Chahta	Choctaw
chp		chp	I/L		ᑌᓀᓲᒢᕄᓀ (Dëne Sųłiné)	Chipewyan; Dene Suline
chq			I/L			Quiotepec Chinantec
chr		chr	I/L		ᏣᎳᎩ	Cherokee
(chs)			I/E			Chumash
cht			I/E			Cholón
chu	cu	chu	I/H	Indo-European	ⱌⱃⰽⰲⰰⱀⱁⱄⰾⱁⰲⱑⱀⱄⰽⱜ ⰵⰸⰻⰽⱜ; ⱄⰾⱁⰲⱑⱀⱐⱄⰽⱏ ⱗⰸⱏⰺⰽⱏ Црькъвьнословѣ́ньскъ ѩꙁꙑ́къ; словѣ́ньскъ ѩꙁꙑ́къ	Church Slavic; Church Slavonic; Old Bulgarian; Old Church Slavonic; Old Slavonic
chv	cv	chv	I/L	Turkic	Чӑваш	Chuvash
chw			I/L			Chuwabu
chx			I/L			Chantyal
chy		chy	I/L		Tsêhést	Cheyenne
chz			I/L			Ozumacín Chinantec
cia			I/L			Cia-Cia
cib			I/L			Ci Gbe
cic			I/L		Chikasha	Chickasaw
cid			I/E			Chimariko
cie			I/L			Cineni
cih			I/L			Chinali
cik			I/L	Sino-Tibetan	चित्कुली किन्नौरी	Chitkuli Kinnauri
cim			I/L		Zimbrisch	Cimbrian
cin			I/L			Cinta Larga
cip			I/L			Chiapanec
cir			I/L			Haméa; Méa; Tiri
(cit)			I/L			Chittagonian
ciw			I/L		ᐊᓂᐦᔑᓈᐯᒧᐧᐃᓐ / ᐅᒋᐧᐯᒧᐧᐃᓐ (Anishinaabemowin / Ojibwemowin)	Chippewa
ciy			I/L			Chaima
cja			I/L			Western Cham
cje			I/L			Chru
cjh			I/E			Upper Chehalis
cji			I/L			Chamalal
cjk			I/L			Chokwe
cjm			I/L			Eastern Cham
cjn			I/L			Chenapian
cjo			I/L			Ashéninka Pajonal
cjp			I/L			Cabécar
(cjr)			I/E			Chorotega
cjs			I/L		Шор	Shor
cjv			I/L			Chuave
cjy			I/L	Sino-Tibetan	晋语	Jinyu Chinese
(cka)			I/L			Khumi Awa Chin
ckb			I/L	Indo-European	کوردی	Central Kurdish
(ckc)			I/L	Cakchiquel		Northern Cakchiquel
(ckd)			I/L	Cakchiquel		South Central Cakchiquel
(cke)			I/L	Cakchiquel		Eastern Cakchiquel
(ckf)			I/L	Cakchiquel		Southern Cakchiquel
ckh			I/L			Chak
(cki)			I/L	Cakchiquel		Santa María De Jesús Cakchiquel
(ckj)			I/L	Cakchiquel		Santo Domingo Xenacoj Cakchiquel
(ckk)			I/L	Cakchiquel		Acatenango Southwestern Cakchiquel
ckl			I/L			Cibak
ckm			I/L	Indo-European		Chakavian
ckn			I/L			Kaang Chin
cko			I/L			Anufo
ckq			I/L			Kajakse
ckr			I/L			Kairak
cks			I/L			Tayo
ckt			I/L		чаучу	Chukot
cku			I/L			Koasati
ckv			I/L			Kavalan
(ckw)			I/L			Western Cakchiquel
ckx			I/L			Caka
cky			I/L			Cakfem-Mushere
ckz			I/L			Cakchiquel-Quiché Mixed Language
cla			I/L			Ron
clc			I/L	Dené–Yeniseian?	Tŝinlhqutʼin	Chilcotin; Tsilhqot’in
cld			I/L		ܟܠܕܝܐ	Chaldean Neo-Aramaic
cle			I/L			Lealao Chinantec
clh			I/L			Chilisso
cli			I/L			Chakali
clj			I/L			Laitu Chin
clk			I/L	Sino-Tibetan?		Idu-Mishmi
cll			I/L			Chala
clm			I/L	Salishan	nəxʷsƛʼayʼəmʼúcən	Klallam; Clallam
clo			I/L			Lowland Oaxaca Chontal
cls			I/H	Indo-European		Classical Sanskrit
clt			I/L			Lautu Chin
clu			I/L			Caluyanun
clw			I/L			Chulym
cly			I/L			Eastern Highland Chatino
cma			I/L			Maa
cme			I/L			Cerma
cmg			I/H			Classical Mongolian
cmi			I/L			Emberá-Chamí
(cmk)			I/E	spurious language		Chimakum
cml			I/L			Campalagian
cmm			I/E			Michigamea
cmn			I/L	Sino-Tibetan	官话/官話; 北方话; 普通话; 國語; 华语	Mandarin Chinese
cmo			I/L			Central Mnong
cmr			I/L			Mro-Khimi Chin
cms			I/H			Messapic
cmt			I/L			Camtho
cna			I/L			Changthang
cnb			I/L			Chinbon Chin
cnc			I/L			Côông
cng			I/L	Sino-Tibetan	Rrmearr	Northern Qiang
cnh			I/L			Haka Chin; Hakha Chin
cni			I/L			Asháninka
cnk			I/L			Khumi Chin
cnl			I/L			Lalana Chinantec
(cnm)			I/L			Ixtatán Chuj
cno			I/L			Con
cnp			I/L	Sino-Tibetan	桂北平话	Northern Ping Chinese; Northern Pinghua
cnq			I/L	Niger–Congo?	Cung	Chung
cnr		cnr	I/L	Indo-European	crnogorski / црногорски	Montenegrin
cns			I/L			Central Asmat
cnt			I/L			Tepetotutla Chinantec
cnu			I/L			Chenoua
cnw			I/L	Sino-Tibetan		Ngawn Chin
cnx			I/H			Middle Cornish
coa			I/L			Cocos Islands Malay
cob			I/E			Chicomuceltec
coc			I/L		Kwikapa	Cocopa
cod			I/L			Cocama-Cocamilla
coe			I/L			Koreguaje
cof			I/L			Colorado
cog			I/L			Chong
coh			I/L			Chichonyi-Chidzihana-Chikauma; Chonyi-Dzihana-Kauma
coj			I/E		Tipai	Cochimi
cok			I/L			Santa Teresa Cora
col			I/L			Columbia-Wenatchi
com			I/L		nʉmʉ tekwapʉ̱	Comanche
con			I/L			Cofán
coo			I/L		Saɬuɬtxʷ	Comox
cop		cop	I/E		ⲙⲉⲧⲛ̀ⲣⲉⲙⲛ̀ⲭⲏⲙⲓ	Coptic
coq			I/E			Coquille
cor	kw	cor	I/L	Indo-European	Kernewek	Cornish
cos	co	cos	I/L	Indo-European	corsu	Corsican
cot			I/L			Caquinte
cou			I/L			Wamey
cov			I/L			Cao Miao
cow			I/E			Cowlitz
cox			I/L			Nanti
(coy)			I/E			Coyaima
coz			I/L			Chochotec
cpa			I/L			Palantla Chinantec
cpb			I/L			Ucayali-Yurúa Ashéninka
cpc			I/L			Ajyíninka Apurucayali
cpg			I/E			Cappadocian Greek
cpi			I/L			Chinese Pidgin English
cpn			I/L			Cherepon
cpo			I/L			Kpeego
cps			I/L			Capiznon
cpu			I/L			Pichis Ashéninka
cpx			I/L	Sino-Tibetan	莆仙語; 莆仙話/莆仙话	Pu-Xian Chinese
cpy			I/L			South Ucayali Ashéninka
cqd			I/L	Hmong–Mien	lug Moob	Chuanqiandian Cluster Miao
(cqu)			I/L			Chilean Quechua
cra			I/L			Chara
crb			I/E			Island Carib
crc			I/L			Lonwolwol
crd			I/L			Coeur d'Alene
cre	cr	cre	M/L	Cree	ᓀᐦᐃᔭᐤ (Nehiyāw)	Cree
crf			I/E			Caramanta
crg			I/L			Michif
crh		crh	I/L		Къырым Татар	Crimean Tatar; Crimean Turkish
cri			I/L			Sãotomense
crj			I/L	Cree		Southern East Cree
crk			I/L	Cree		Plains Cree
crl			I/L	Cree		Northern East Cree
crm			I/L	Cree		Moose Cree
crn			I/L			El Nayar Cora
cro			I/L			Crow
crq			I/L			Iyo'wujwa Chorote
crr			I/E			Carolina Algonquian
crs			I/L			Seselwa Creole French
crt			I/L			Iyojwa'ja Chorote
(cru)			I/E			Carútana
crv			I/L			Chaura
crw			I/L			Chrau
crx			I/L		ᑕᗸᒡ	Carrier
cry			I/L			Cori
crz			I/E			Cruzeño
csa			I/L			Chiltepec Chinantec
csb		csb	I/L		kaszëbsczi	Kashubian
csc			I/L	maybe French Sign	Llengua de signes catalana	Catalan Sign Language; Lengua de señas catalana; Llengua de Signes Catalana
csd			I/L			Chiangmai Sign Language
cse			I/L			Czech Sign Language
csf			I/L			Cuba Sign Language
csg			I/L			Chilean Sign Language
csh			I/L			Asho Chin
csi			I/E			Coast Miwok
csj			I/L			Songlai Chin
csk			I/L			Jola-Kasa
csl			I/L			Chinese Sign Language
csm			I/L			Central Sierra Miwok
csn			I/L			Colombian Sign Language
cso			I/L	Oto-Mangue		Sochiapam Chinantec; Sochiapan Chinantec
csp			I/L	Sino-Tibetan	桂南平话	Southern Ping Chinese; Southern Pinghua
csq			I/L			Croatia Sign Language
csr			I/L			Costa Rican Sign Language
css			I/E			Southern Ohlone
cst			I/L			Northern Ohlone
csv			I/L			Sumtu Chin
csw			I/L	Cree		Swampy Cree
csx			I/L			Cambodian Sign Language
csy			I/L			Siyin Chin
csz			I/L			Coos
cta			I/L			Tataltepec Chatino
ctc			I/E			Chetco
ctd			I/L			Tedim Chin
cte			I/L			Tepinapa Chinantec
ctg			I/L	Indo-European	চাটগাঁইয়া	Chittagonian
cth			I/L			Thaiphum Chin
(cti)			I/L			Tila Chol
ctl			I/L			Tlacoatzintepec Chinantec
ctm			I/E			Chitimacha
ctn			I/L			Chhintange
cto			I/L			Emberá-Catío
ctp			I/L			Western Highland Chatino
cts			I/L			Northern Catanduanes Bikol
ctt			I/L	Dravidian		Wayanad Chetti
ctu			I/L			Chol
cty			I/L	Dravidian		Moundadan Chetty
ctz			I/L			Zacatepec Chatino
cua			I/L			Cua
cub			I/L			Cubeo
cuc			I/L			Usila Chinantec
(cug)			I/L			Chungmboko
cuh			I/L			Chuka; Gichuka
cui			I/L			Cuiba
cuj			I/L			Mashco Piro
cuk			I/L			San Blas Kuna
cul			I/L			Culina; Kulina
(cum)			I/E	spurious language		Cumeral
(cun)			I/L			Cunén Quiché
cuo			I/E			Cumanagoto
cup			I/E		Kuupangaxwichem	Cupeño
cuq			I/L			Cun
cur			I/L			Chhulung
cut			I/L			Teutila Cuicatec
cuu			I/L			Tai Ya
cuv			I/L			Cuvok
cuw			I/L			Chukwa
cux			I/L			Tepeuxila Cuicatec
cuy			I/L	isolate		Cuitlatec
cvg			I/L	Sino-Tibetan	Duhumbi	Chug
cvn			I/L			Valle Nacional Chinantec
cwa			I/L			Kabwa
cwb			I/L			Maindo
cwd			I/L	Cree		Woods Cree
cwe			I/L			Kwere
cwg			I/L			Cheq Wong; Chewong
cwt			I/L			Kuwaataay
cxh			I/L	Afro-Asiatic		Cha'ari
cya			I/L			Nopala Chatino
cyb			I/E			Cayubaba
cym	cy	wel	I/L	Indo-European	Cymraeg	Welsh
cyo			I/L			Cuyonon
czh			I/L	Sino-Tibetan	徽州话; 徽语	Huizhou Chinese
czk			I/E			Knaanic
czn			I/L			Zenzontepec Chatino
czo			I/L	Sino-Tibetan	闽中语/閩中語	Min Zhong Chinese
czt			I/L			Zotung Chin

== Sources ==
- "ISO 639-2 Registration Authority". Library of Congress.
- "ISO 639-3 Registration Authority". SIL International.
- Lewis, M. Paul; Simons, Gary F.; Fennig, Charles D., eds. (2016). "Ethnologue: Languages of the World" (19th ed.). Dallas, Texas: SIL International.
