= Chinantecan languages =

Oto-Manguean language branch of Mexico

Chinantec
- Tsa Jujmi
- Native to: Mexico
- Region: Oaxaca
- Ethnicity: Chinantecs
- Native speakers: 140,000 (2020 census)
- Language family: Oto-Manguean: Western; Oto-Pame–Chinantecan; Chinantec

Language codes
- ISO 639-3: Variously: cco – Comaltepec Chinantec chj – Ojitlán Chinantec chq – Quiotepec Chinantec chz – Ozumacín Chinantec cle – Lealao Chinantec cnl – Lalana Chinantec cnt – Tepetotutla Chinantec cpa – Palantla Chinantec csa – Chiltepec Chinantec cso – Sochiapan Chinantec cte – Tepinapa Chinantec ctl – Tlacoatzintepec Chinantec cuc – Usila Chinantec cvn – Valle Nacional Chinantec
- Glottolog: chin1484
- ELP: Central Chinantec
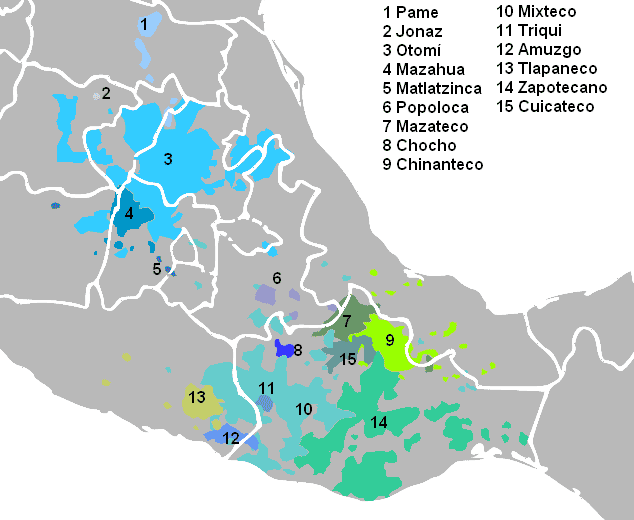
- The Chinantecan languages, number 9 (chartreuse), east.

The Chinantec or Chinantecan languages constitute a branch of the Oto-Manguean family. Though traditionally considered a single language, Ethnologue lists 14 partially mutually unintelligible varieties of Chinantec. The languages are spoken by the indigenous Chinantec people who live in Oaxaca and Veracruz, Mexico, especially in the districts of Cuicatlán, Ixtlán de Juárez, Tuxtepec and Choapan, and in Staten Island, New York.

== Internal classification ==
Egland and Bartholomew (1978) established fourteen Chinantec languages on the basis of 80% mutual intelligibility. Ethnologue found that one that had not been adequately compared (Tlaltepusco) was not distinct, but split another (Lalana from Tepinapa). At a looser criterion of 70% intelligibility, Lalana–Tepinapa, Quiotepec–Comaltepec, Palantla–Valle Nacional, and geographically distant Chiltepec–Tlacoatzintepec would be languages, reducing the count to ten. Lealao Chinantec (Latani) is the most divergent.

On the basis of shared phonological innovations, Rensch (1989) groups the Chinantecan languages into 5 clusters, which largely agree with previous ethnographic classifications of the population centers of the Chinantla. He additionally proposes a division into a Northern area represented by group I, a Transitional area represented by group II, and a Southern area represented by groups III-V. The northern languages are considered more innovative both phonologically and lexically, while the southern languages are more conservative in both respects. Phonologically, Ojitlán is found to the most innovative, and Comaltepec the most conservative.

| Language area | Distribution | Rensch (1989) | |
|---|---|---|---|
| Ojitlán | Northern Oaxaca and Veracruz municipios of Minatitlán and Hidalgotitlán | I | Northern |
| Usila | Oaxaca, one town in Veracruz | I | Northern |
| Tlacoatzintepec | Northern Oaxaca | I | Northern |
| Chiltepec | San José Chiltepec, Oaxaca | I | Northern |
| Sochiapan | Northern Oaxaca | I | Northern |
| Tepetotutla | Northern Oaxaca | II | Transitional |
| Palantla | Oaxaca, San Juan Palantla and surrounding towns | II | Transitional |
| Valle Nacional | Northern Oaxaca, Yetla | III | Southern |
| Ozumacín | Oaxaca, San Pedro Ozumacín and surrounding towns | III | Southern |
| Tepinapa | Northern Oaxaca, Choapan District. Very remote area. | IV | Southern |
| Lalana | 25 towns on the border between Oaxaca and Veracruz | IV | Southern |
| Lealao | Northeastern Oaxaca, San Juan Lealao, Latani, Tres Arroyos, and La Hondura | IV | Southern |
| Comaltepec | Northern Oaxaca, Comaltepec | V | Southern |
| Quiotepec | Oaxaca, San Juan Quiotepec and surrounding towns | V | Southern |

== Phonology ==
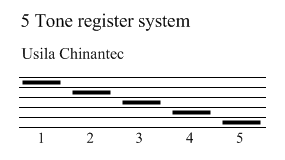
the register-tone inventory of Usila Chinantec

Proto-Chinantecan Consonants
| | | Labial | Alveolar | Dorsal | | Laryngeal |
| | | Labial | Alveolar | plain | labial | Laryngeal |
|---|---|---|---|---|---|---|
| Obstruent | voiceless | *p | *t | *k | *kʷ | *ʔ |
| Obstruent | voiced | *b | *z (Note: The consonant *z is reconstructed as a voiced affricate) | *g | *gʷ | |
| Fricative | | | *s | | | *h |
| Continuant | nasal | *m | *n | *ŋ | | |
| Continuant | oral | *w | *l | *y | | |
| Continuant | rhotic | | *r | | | |

Proto-Chinantecan Nuclei
| | Palatal | | Non-Palatal | |
| | front | back | front | back |
|---|---|---|---|---|
| close | *i | *iu | *ɨ | *u |
| open | e | *ia | *ə | *a |

=== Phonotactics ===
Syllables are typically of the shape (C)V with an optional onset, and in coda position only laryngeal elements and in some languages a nasal consonant. The only initial consonant clusters to occur consist of one of the laryngeal elements ʔ and h followed by a voiced consonant, which in some languages are analyzed as preglottalized or voiceless continuants. In some Chinantecan languages, both pre- and post-nuclear glides may combine with the nucleus to form large inventories of diphthongs and triphthongs.

Roots are predominantly monosyllabic, as fully inflected words often are as well, although there also exist polysyllabic roots, in some cases possibly reflecting fossilized classifiers, and roots of up to 4 syllables are reported in Spanish borrowings.

There is typically a set of nasal vowels, a binary length contrast, and in some languages a number of contrastive phonation types, which in stressed syllables may potentially all co-occur and cross-classify with tone and ballisticity, generating an extremely large number of contrasting syllable nuclei for a given vowel quality.

=== Stress and ballisticity ===
Roots in Chinantecan languages are obligatorily stressed, and stress typically falls on the final syllable of the root. Often only stressed syllables display the full range of phonological contrasts, and in some languages there may be a tendency to disallow complex tones and codas in non-stressed syllables.

Within stressed syllables, many Chinantecan languages have been analyzed as exhibiting a distinction, also observed in the distantly related Amuzgoan languages, between ballistic stress, characterized by an "initial surge and rapid decay of intensity" and shorter duration among other features, and controlled stress, which "exhibit no such initial surge of intensity, displaying a more evenly controlled decrease of intensity" and are generally longer. There is variation in the phonetic realization of ballisticity among Chinantecan languages which are thought to exhibit the contrast, and in others, the typical phonetic correlates of ballisticity are not observed, and the distinction is instead analyzed as being purely tonal or one of vowel length.

=== Tone ===
All Chinantecan languages are tonal. Some, such as Usila Chinantec and Ojitlán Chinantec, have five register tones (in addition to contour tones), with the extreme tones deriving historically from ballistic syllables, while San Juan Quiotepec Chinantec has been analyzed as contrasting 6 level tones, and 6 contour tones comprising 3 falling and 3 rising contours.

6 level tones of SJQ Chinantec, with tonal minimal quintuplet
| Tone | Example | English Gloss | Spanish Gloss |
|---|---|---|---|
| 6 ˥⁺ | o⁶ | I shout | yo grito |
| 5 ˥ | o⁵ | papaya | papaya |
| 4 ˦ | o⁴ | (s/he) crosses | él cruza |
| 3 ˧ | o³ | to cross | cruzar |
| 2 ˨ | puo² | to plaster | repellar |
| 1 ˩ | o¹ | (s/he) shouted | gritó |

== Grammar ==
Grammars are published for Sochiapam Chinantec, and a grammar and a dictionary of Palantla (Tlatepuzco) Chinantec.

=== Syntax ===
Chinantecan languages have VSO as their unmarked word order, with focused constituents typically being able to be fronted before the verb, and are strongly head-initial, as is the case for most Otomanguean languages. The following examples from San Juan Quiotepec Chinantec demonstrate basic word order facts:

tɘɨtsei²³ seʼ³⁴ do¹ saʼo⁴⁵³
remember.3.IMPERF Cesar DEM mother.3SG.POSS
V S {} O
'Cesar remembers his mother'

gɨ¹ ngɨ²¹ seʼ³⁴ do¹
PERF walk.3.PERF Cesar DEM
{} V S {}
'Cesar walked'

tɘɨtsei²³ { saʼo⁴⁵³ }
remember.3.IMPERF {mother.3SG.POSS}
V O
'(He) remembers his mother'

In Lealao Chinantec, however, default word order in transitive sentences with non-pronominal subjects is VOS:

kaᴸ-báᴴ-i hą́ːᴴ zaᴹ nïᴹ
PST-beat.TR.AN.COMPL.3-3 child.3.POSS person that
V O S {}
'That person beat his child'

maᴹ-kúʔᴸ-i hniáᴴ miⱽᴴ-maᴸtaʔⱽᴴ
PST-eat.TR.INAN.COMPL.1SG-1SG 1SG pineapple
V S O
'I ate a pineapple'

Example phrase:

ca¹-dsén¹=jni chi³ chieh³
‘I pulled out the hen (from the box).

The parts of this sentence are: ca¹ a prefix which marks the past tense, dsén¹ which is the verb stem meaning "to pull out an animate object", the suffix -jni referring to the first person, the noun classifier chi³ and the noun chieh³ meaning chicken.

=== Animacy ===
Chinantecan languages group nouns into one of two genders based on animacy. Animals, humans, and some natural phenomena such as thunder or stars which are considered spirits in Chinantec mythology are animate, while plants and body parts are inanimate. Animacy is not overtly marked on the noun itself, but adjectives, demonstratives, quantifiers, numerals, and in some languages relativizers agree with the noun they modify in animacy. In most languages, the reflex of the marker of animate gender involves a nasal element, either nasalization of the stem, or a postvocalic nasal, for which reason Rensch (1989) reconstructs *-ŋ as the proto-Chinantecan marker of animacy. In some languages, however, "the marker is primarily a high front vowel or palatal semivowel," thought to be either cognate with or synchronically identical to a 3rd person marker descended from *-i, "but in every case there is some involvement of nasalization," and in other languages, both occur, either together or in complementary distribution. Furthermore, in some languages, animacy agreement with nouns may be marked by changes in tone and stress, stem apophony, and even suppletion.

nɨ³ mɨʔ³ tiaa³ ké⁴ ʔi³-nɨ³
three.INAN basket(INAN) white.INAN of.INAN.1SG REL-that.INAN
'Those three white baskets of mine'

aa³-y laa⁴ tieé⁴-y kiaá² ʔi³-nɨ³²-y
three.AN-AN mule(AN) white.AN-AN of.AN.1SG REL-that.AN-AN
'Those three white mules of mine'

Verbs agree with one of their core arguments in animacy as well, following an ergative pattern where intransitive verbs agree with the subject, and transitive verbs agree with the patient. Verbs thus fall into one of at least 4 transitivity-animacy classes, conventionally labelled ii (Inanimate Intransitive), ai (Animate Intransitive), ti (Transitive Inanimate), and ta (Transitive Animate), in a scheme like the one used for the Algonquian languages. The following examples from Tepetotula Chinantec demonstrate the 4 agreement patterns with the verbs stand (ii), stand (ai), leave (ti), leave (ta). Note the presence of nasalization and differing vowel quality in the animate verb stems.

cíʔᴸᴹ cïᴴ-ʔnéᴸᴹ kauᴸᴹ huïᴸᴹ
stand.INAN.NTR.3 CL-house(INAN) beside trail
'The house stands beside the trail'

kaᴹ-tíᴴ zaᴹ cïᴴʔ-néᴸᴹ kióʔᴸᴹ
PST-leave.TR.INAN.COMPL.3 3 CL-house(INAN) of.INAN.3
'He abandoned his house'

cę́ʔᴸᴹ zïᴹ-kuaᴴ kauᴸᴹ huïᴸᴹ
stand.AN.NTR.3 CL-horse(AN) beside trail
'The horse stands beside the trail'

kaᴹ-tę́ᴹ zaᴹ ʔioᴸᴴ kią́ᴸᴹi
PST-leave.TR.AN.COMPL.3 3 woman(AN) of.AN.3
'He abandoned his wife'

=== Verbs ===
Verbs in Chinantecan languages have the following structure:

1. a number of prefixes which typically co-occur in a fixed order; express categories such as tense, aspect, mood, evidentiality, movement, and posture; and select for only certain tense-aspect forms of the stem;
2. an obligatory stem, which inflects for 4 core persons (1sg, 1pl, 2, 3) and a number of tense, aspect, and motion categories through a combination of tone, vowel length, ballisticity, glottal coda, and ablaut, the last of which is thought to reflect the alternation between the proto-Chinantecan palatal and non-palatal vowel series;
3. suffixes or enclitics which mark certain grammatical persons not distinguished by tone and other internal changes in the verb stem, typically 2pl, 3pl, and clusivity distinctions in the first-person plural. In some languages, postposed free-standing pronouns are instead used.

In summary, the full range of tense-aspect-mood distinctions in a language is expressed by the tense-aspect series of the stem in combination with its prefixes, and person by the person series of the stem in combination with its suffixes or free-standing pronouns.

Ñí¹-ca³-ta³-hí¹-chí¹- hóh³² dáɨn² pih²¹ hñu³ mí²tiéi²
EVID-PAST-CONT-MOT-sustained.PROG- cry.INTR.AN.3 baby little inside shawl
'The little baby in the shawl was evidently constantly crying nonstop (while) hanging (there).'

While the shape of the stem used for a given combination of person and tense-aspect-mood may appear unpredictable, "starting from Merrifield (1968), the existing descriptive tradition of Chinantecan languages from the SIL suggests that the entire paradigm of a verb is retrievable from the inflectional information provided by only 12 cells," which represent the product of the 4 core persons, and 3 core tense-aspect categories, termed Progressive, Intentive, and Completive (alternatively Present, Future, and Past, respectively). The form of the stem used for categories beyond the 3 core tense-aspects is thus predictable from one of the 12 forms.

Lealao 12-stem paradigm for verb spy (ti)
| | 1sg | 1pl | 2 | 3 |
|---|---|---|---|---|
| Progressive | taᴸ | tiaᴸᴴ | taᴹ | tiaᴸ |
| Intentive | taᴸᴴ | tiaᴴ | taᴹ | tiáᴸ |
| Completive | táᴸ | tiaᴴ | tiáⱽᴴ | tiáᴹ |

Tepetotutla 12-stem paradigm for verb dance (ai)
| | 1sg | 1pl | 2 | 3 |
|---|---|---|---|---|
| Progressive | zą́ᴸᴹ | ziógᴸᴹ | zą́ᴸᴹʔ | ząᴸᴹ |
| Intentive | zą́ᴹᴴ | ziógᴹᴴ | zą́ᴹᴴʔ | ząᴸ |
| Completive | zą́ᴸ | zioiᴹᴴ | zą́ᴸʔ | zą́ᴹ |

Comaltepec 12-stem paradigm with only suprasegmentals
| | 1sg | 1pl | 2 | 3 |
|---|---|---|---|---|
| Progressive | Lːˊ | Mː | Lː | Lːˊ |
| Intentive | LHːˊ | Hːˊ | Hːˊ | Mːˊ |
| Completive | Mˊ | Hˊ | Mː | Lːˊ |

== Whistled speech ==
The Chinantec people have practiced whistled speech since the pre-Columbian era. The high functional load of tone, stress, vowel length, laryngeal configuration, intonation, and rhythm in the Chinantecan languages allows speakers to convey complex messages by transposing the prosodic qualities of the spoken languages onto various whistled registers, even in the complete absence of consonants, vowels, and nasalization. In Sochiapam Chinantec, the cross-classifying prosodic features produce 31 distinct tone-stress-glottalization patterns, for which 4 distinct styles of whistling are used:

- whistling with the tongue against the alveolar ridge for close-by communication, called siɛ², (up to 10 m (33 ft));
- bilabial whistling for mid- to far-distance communication, called huɯ³², (up to 200 m (660 ft));
- fingers-in-mouth whistling for far-distance communication, called huɔ², (up to 1 km (0.62 mi) and sometimes more depending on terrain);
- falsetto speech for mid- to far-distance communication, called hɔ́h³², (up to 1 km (0.62 mi)).

Whistled speech is typically only used by Chinantec men, although women may also understand it. Use of the whistled language is declining, as modern technology such as walkie-talkies and loudspeakers have made long-distance communication easier.

== Media ==
Chinantec-language programming is carried by the CDI's radio stations XEOJN, broadcasting from San Lucas Ojitlán, Oaxaca, and XEGLO, broadcasting from Guelatao de Juárez, Oaxaca.

Example of Chinantec in written form from the Biblioteca Cervantina

Example of Chinantec in written form from the Biblioteca Cervantina
