= Choapam =

Choapam (also Choápam or Choapan) may refer to:

- Choapam District, Oaxaca
- Santiago Choapam, Oaxaca
- Choápam Zapotec language
