= Chinantec of Tepetotutla =

Chinantecan language of Mexico

Tepetotutla Chinantec
- Native to: Mexico
- Region: Oaxaca
- Ethnicity: Chinantecs
- Native speakers: (1,900 cited 2000)
- Language family: Oto-Mangue: Western Oto-Mangue; Oto-Pame–Chinantecan; Chinantec; Tepetotutla Chinantec

Language codes
- ISO 639-3: cnt
- Glottolog: tepe1279
- ELP: Lower West-Central Chinantec

Tepetotutla Chinantec (Chinanteco de Santa Cruz Tepetotutla) is a minor Chinantecan language of Mexico, spoken in northern Oaxaca in the towns of Santa Cruz Tepetotutla, San Antonio del Barrio, San Pedro Tlatepusco, Santo Tomás Texas, Vega del Sol, and El Naranjal. It has 60% intelligibility with Quiotepec Chinantec and Palantla Chinantec.
