= Usila Chinantec =

Chinantec language of Mexico

Usila
- Native to: Mexico
- Region: Oaxaca, one town in Veracruz
- Ethnicity: Chinantecs
- Native speakers: (7,400 cited 2000)
- Language family: Oto-Mangue: Western Oto-Mangue; Oto-Pame–Chinantecan; Chinantec; Usila

Language codes
- ISO 639-3: cuc
- Glottolog: usil1237
- ELP: Upper West-Central Chinantec

Usila is a Chinantec language of Mexico. It is most similar to Tlacoatzintepec Chinantec, with which it has 50% intelligibility (intelligibility in the reverse direction is 85%, presumably due to greater familiarity in that direction).

== Phonology ==
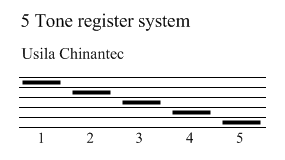
the register-tone inventory of Usila Chinantec

Like other Chinantecan and Mazatec languages, Usila Chinantec is a tonal language noted for having whistled speech. Its tone system is unusually finely graded, however, with five register tones and four contour tones.
