= Chinantec of Ojitlán =

Chinantecan language of Mexico

Ojitlán Chinantec
- jújmi kíꞌ tsa kö ꞌwɨ̱̈ɨ̈
- Native to: Mexico
- Region: Oaxaca, Veracruz
- Ethnicity: Chinantecs
- Native speakers: (38,000 cited 2000)
- Language family: Oto-Mangue: Western Oto-Mangue; Oto-Pame–Chinantecan; Chinantec; Ojitlán Chinantec

Language codes
- ISO 639-3: chj
- Glottolog: ojit1237
- ELP: Northern Chinantec

Ojitlán Chinantec (Chinanteco de San Lucas Ojitlán) is a major Chinantecan language of Mexico, spoken in four towns in San Lucas Ojitlán of northern Oaxaca, and in the Veracruz municipos of Minatitlán and Hidalgotitlán.

== Phonology ==
=== Vowels ===
There are only a few monomorphemic words that display contrastive vowel length, so this Chinantecan feature may be being lost from Ojitlán.

		Front	Central	Back	
		Front	Central	unrounded	rounded
Close	oral	i		ɯ	u
Close	nasal	ĩ		ɯ̃	(ũ)
Mid	oral	e		ɤ	o
Mid	nasal	(ẽ)		ɤ̃	õ
Open	oral		a		
Open	nasal		ã		

/i e o/ are freely realized as [ɪ ɛ ɔ]. /a/ is occasionally [æ].

/ɯ/ and /ɤ/ are difficult to distinguish, but there are a few minimal pairs.

Each vowel can be nasalized. /ẽ/ and /ũ/ are rare.

=== Consonants ===
		Labial	Alveolar	Retroflex	Postalv. / Palatal	Velar	Glottal
Plosive	voiceless	p	t			k	ʔ
Plosive	voiced					ɡ ~ ɣ	
Fricative			s		ʃ	ɡ ~ ɣ	h
Affricate			t͡s		t͡ʃ		
Trill			r				
Nasal	voiced	m	n			ŋ	
Nasal	voiceless	m̥	n̥			ŋ̊	
Lateral	voiced		l	ɭ			
Lateral	voiceless			ɭ̥			
Glide	voiced	w			j		
Glide	voiceless	w̥			j̊		

/p/ is uncommon.

Some consonants are nearly in complementary distribution:

- /ɡ/ only occurs before /i/, whereas /k/ rarely occurs before /i/. Post-pausa /ɡ/ may be realized as [ŋg] or [ɣ], whereas intervocalic /ɡ/ is nearly always [ɣ].
- /tʃ/ occurs before front vowels and /a/, whereas /ts/ occurs before back vowels and /a/.

/r/ is occasionally a single-contract trill, and post-pausa may be [nr].

/l/ is apical alveolar.

/ŋ/ and /ŋ̊/ are [ɲ, ɲ̊] before /i/.

The voiceless sonorants are analyzed as /hC/ sequences in other Chinantecan languages, and in addition there is a series of /ʔC/ sequences /ʔm, ʔŋ, ʔw, ʔj/ in Ojitlán. The Ojitlán retroflex lateral corresponds to /ʔl/ in other Chinantec, and that is perhaps how it should be analyzed in Ojitlán as well.

=== Tones ===
Syllables may be unstressed or have normal stress. Normal stress involves increased length and amplitude of the vowel. What was historically ballistic stress is realized in Ojitlán as extra-high and extra-low tones (from ballistic high and ballistic falling, respectively), and tend to involve aspiration of the consonant, breathiness of the vowel and a sharp falling pitch but not the other correlates of Chinantecan ballistic syllables. There are also a number of phonemic (as opposed to just phonetic) contour tones, though the number had not been established as of Macaulay (1999).

Ojitlán tones
Tone	Example	Translation	Phonetic realization
Extra high	a̋ʔ	cricket	sharp falling contour
High	óʔ	broken	slight rising-falling contour
Mid	ɤ̄ʔ	measles	slight falling contour
Low	à	many	slight rising-falling contour
Extra low	ɯ̏ʔ	when	sharp falling contour
Low rising	kĩ́ʔo᷅ʔ	door	
Mid rising	he᷄ːŋã̄	forest	
High falling	ʔnã᷇	open	
Mid falling	tʃi᷆ː	good	

== Writing system ==
Several spellings of Chinantec of Ojitlán have been developed. The Institute National for Adult Education (INEA) and SIL International use different spellings.

In the spelling of INEA, the high tone is indicated using the acute accent of the letter of the vowel, the medium tone by the absence of a diacritic above or below it, the low tone using the underlined line, and the very low tone using the double underlined line. This spelling uses seven letters for the vowels: ⟨a, e, ɇ, i, ɨ, o, u⟩.

a	b	ch	e	ɇ	i	j	k	l	m	n	n
ng	ñ	o	p	r	s	t	ts	u	w	y	
