= Chinantec of Ozumacín =

Chinantecan language of Oaxaca, Mexico

Ozumacín Chinantec
- Native to: Mexico
- Region: Oaxaca
- Ethnicity: Chinantecs
- Native speakers: (3,100 cited 2000)
- Language family: Oto-Mangue: Western Oto-Mangue; Oto-Pame–Chinantecan; Chinantec; Ozumacín Chinantec
- Dialects: Ayotzintepec

Language codes
- ISO 639-3: chz
- Glottolog: ozum1235
- ELP: Upper Southeastern Chinantec

Ozumacín Chinantec (Chinanteco de San Pedro Ozumacín) is a Chinantecan language of Mexico, spoken in northern Oaxaca in the towns of San Pedro Ozumacín, Ayotzintepec, Santiago Progreso.

== Phonology ==
=== Vowels ===
There are ten vowels, which may be oral or nasal. A length distinction is made in writing by doubling the vowel, but this is based on comparison with other Chinantec languages; the distinction is apparently being lost from Ozumacín Chinantec.

	Front	Central	Back
Close	i, y ⟨ʉ⟩	ɨ ⟨ɨ⟩	u
Mid	e, ø ⟨ø⟩	ɘ ⟨ë⟩	o
Open	æ ⟨ä⟩		a

Nasal vowels are written with an underscore, e.g. ji̱i̱ˊ 'bed'. This is not written after a nasal consonant, where there is no contrast with oral vowels.

The front rounded vowels arose historically from the influence of palatalized consonants on back vowels.

=== Consonants ===
Consonants and their orthography are as follows:

		Labial	Alveolar	Postalveolar	Palatal	Velar			Laryngeal		
		Labial	Alveolar	Postalveolar	Palatal	plain	pal.	lab.	plain	pal.	lab.
Nasal		m	n		ɲ (Note: It may be that ñ is /j/ before a nasal vowel.) ⟨ñ⟩	ŋ ⟨ng⟩					
Plosive & Affricate	voiceless	p	t	tʃ ⟨ch⟩		k	kʲ ⟨ky⟩	kʷ ⟨kw⟩	ʔ ⟨h⟩	ʔʲ ⟨hy⟩	ʔʷ ⟨hw⟩
Plosive & Affricate	voiced	b	d dz ⟨ds⟩	dʒ ⟨ll⟩		ɡ	ɡʲ ⟨gy⟩	ɡʷ ⟨gw⟩			
Fricative			s						h ⟨j⟩	hʲ ⟨jy⟩	hʷ ⟨jw⟩
Liquid			l, ɾ ⟨r⟩								
Semivowel					j ⟨y⟩	w					

/p/ and /b/ are rare in native words. Apart from loans, /d/ occurs only in the enclitic daˊ, which softens an imperative. The letters c and f are used for Spanish borrowings.

/h/ merges with a following /l, m, n, ɲ, ŋ/ to produce [l̥, m̥, n̥, ɲ̊, ŋ̊].

=== Tones ===
Ozumacín Chinantec has nine tones. They are written as follows:

Tone	Example	Translation
high tone	tooˈ	metate
mid tone	tooˊ	mamey seed
low tone	tooˉ	banana
high ballistic tone	kooꜗ	(it) will burn
mid ballistic tone	kooꜘ	next to
low ballistic tone	kooꜙ	(s/he) is playing
high rising tone	juuhꜚ	pine(cone? apple? Sp. piña)
mid rising tone	juuh˜	(s/he) is coughing
low rising tone	juuhˋ	cough!

Ballistic syllables are marked by a steep drop in pitch.

== Writing system ==
=== Unicode support ===
The following diacritics are used to mark Ozumacín tones.

U+02C8 ˈ MODIFIER LETTER VERTICAL LINE
U+02C9 ˉ MODIFIER LETTER MACRON
U+02CA ˊ MODIFIER LETTER ACUTE ACCENT
U+A717 ꜗ MODIFIER LETTER DOT VERTICAL BAR
U+A718 ꜘ MODIFIER LETTER DOT SLASH
U+A719 ꜙ MODIFIER LETTER DOT HORIZONTAL BAR
U+A71A ꜚ MODIFIER LETTER LOWER RIGHT CORNER ANGLE
U+02DC ˜ SMALL TILDE
U+02CB ˋ MODIFIER LETTER GRAVE ACCENT

== Sample text ==
A sample with all tone marks:

Ko̱o̱ˉ häˊ gaꜙnääꜗ u̱u̱ꜗ chiihˉ gaꜙki̱i̱ꜙ kwɨɨˉ. Maˉtë̱ë̱yꜘ to̱ꜗdsaahˋ jwëˈ. Jeeˊ ja̱ˉ kyeeˉ ko̱o̱ˉ jmɨɨˉ. Hñiiꜘ jeeˊ ja̱ˉ gaꜙje̱e̱yˈ ko̱o̱ˉ løøˈ johꜗ. Kë̱ë̱ˉ gaˊ miihˉ dsaˉ jʉʉˊ løøˈ ja̱ˉ. Gaꜙta̱a̱hˋ chiihˉ heꜘ taꜙ kooꜘ. Naꜚ heˉ gaꜙlaꜗ kihꜗ løøˈ ja̱ˉ. Ja̱ˉ gaꜙngɨɨꜗ chiihˉ heꜘ. Ja̱ˉ tä̱ä̱hˊ chiihˉ heꜘ ngɨɨ˜ maˊja̱hꜗ dsaˉ jʉʉˊ. Läꜙgaꜙjä̱ꜘ ja̱ˉ baˊ løøˈ ja̱ˉ, gaꜙjä̱ꜘ oꜙhihꜙ.

This orthography is used in the Ozumacín Bible.
