= ACPU =

ACPU may refer to:

- Auxiliary Computer Power Unit, for the Gemini Guidance Computer
- Aircell Central Processor Unit, by Aircell
- Alignment control panel, in the Glossary of military abbreviations

== See also ==
- CPU (disambiguation)
