= CHJ =

CHJ or chj may refer to:

- Chj (trigraph), used in Corsican to represent the sound /c/
- Charles Hollis Jones, founder of CHJ Designs
- Chris Harris Jr., former National Football League cornerback, primarily with the Denver Broncos
- Chinantec of Ojitlán, a language with ISO 639 code 'chj'
- Chipinge Airport, IATA code 'CHJ'
