= Sochiapam Chinantec =

Language

Sochiapam
- Native to: Mexico
- Region: Oaxaca
- Ethnicity: 6,300 Chinantecs (no date)
- Native speakers: (3,600 cited 2000)
- Language family: Oto-Mangue: Western Oto-Mangue; Oto-Pame–Chinantecan; Chinantec; Sochiapam

Language codes
- ISO 639-3: cso
- Glottolog: soch1239
- ELP: Western Chinantec

Sochiapam (/soʊˈtʃiːəpæm/ soh-CHEE-ə-pam) is a Chinantec language of Mexico. It is most similar to Tlacoatzintepec Chinantec, with which it has 66% intelligibility (intelligibility in the reverse direction is 75%, presumably due to greater familiarity in that direction).

Sochiapam has seven tones: high, mid, low, high falling, mid falling, mid rising, low rising.

Like other Chinantec and Mazatec languages, Sochiapam Chinantec is noted for having whistled speech (produced only by men, but understood by all). More unusually, it has also been reported to have a rare marked absolutive case system.

== Phonology ==
The following are sounds of Sochiapan Chinantec:

Consonants
		Labial	Interdental	Alveolar	Retroflex	Velar	Laryngeal
Nasal		m		n		ŋ	
Stop	voiceless	p		t		k	ʔ
Stop	voiced					(ɡ)	
Affricate				ts			
Fricative	voiceless	(ɸ)	θ	s			h
Fricative	voiced	β	ð		ʐ		
Liquid	lateral			l			
Liquid	rhotic			(ɾ)			

1. Parenthesised sounds are loans, allophones, or free variants
2. /p, t, k/ tends to be slightly aspirated
3. Alveolar and velar consonants are palatalised before the semivowel /j/

Vowels
	Front	Central	Back	
	Front	Central	unrounded	rounded
High	i		ɨ	u
Mid	e		ɘ	o
Low		a		

Tones
