= San Juan Comaltepec =

- Municipality and town
- Location in Mexico
- Coordinates: 17°20′N 95°58′W
- Country: Mexico
- State: Oaxaca

Area
  - Total: 163.31 km^{2} (63.05 sq mi)

Population (2005)
  - Total: 2,389
- Time zone: UTC-6 (Central Standard Time)

San Juan Comaltepec is a town and municipality in Oaxaca in south-western Mexico. The municipality covers an area of 163.31 km^{2}. It is part of the Choapam District in the south of the Papaloapan Region.

As of 2005, the municipality had a total population of 2,389.
