= Lealao Chinantec =

Chinantecan language of Mexico

- Latani Chinantec
- Native to: Mexico
- Region: Oaxaca
- Ethnicity: Chinantecs
- Native speakers: (2,000 cited 1990 census)
- Language family: Oto-Mangue: Western Oto-Mangue; Oto-Pame–Chinantecan; Chinantec; Lealao Chinantec

Language codes
- ISO 639-3: cle
- Glottolog: leal1235

Lealao (Chinanteco de San Juan Lealao), also known as Latani, is the most divergent of the Chinantecan languages of Mexico. It is spoken in northeast Oaxaca, in the towns of San Juan Lealao, Latani, Tres Arroyos, and La Hondura.
