= CPU (disambiguation) =

CPU, or central processing unit, is a central computer component that executes instructions.

CPU or cpu may also refer to:

== Higher education ==
- Central Philippine University, a private university in Iloilo, Philippines
- Central Police University, a police academy in Taoyuan, Taiwan
- China Pharmaceutical University, a public university in Nanjing, China
  - China Pharmaceutical University station, a metro station serving the university
- Columbia Pacific University, a defunct unaccredited distance-learning institution in Novato, California, United States

== Science and technology ==
- Carboxypeptidase B2, a human enzyme
- Critical Patch Update, software updates in Oracle products such as Oracle Database and Java

== Organizations ==
- Caribbean Postal Union, an association of postal administrators in the Caribbean region
- Central Policy Unit, a head advisory unit to the Chief Executive of Hong Kong
- Clark Public Utilities, a public electric and water utility located in Clark County, Washington
- Commonwealth Press Union, an association of newspapers and news agencies
- Communist Party of Ukraine, a banned political party in Ukraine
- Computer Professionals' Union, a professional organization in the Philippines
- Contract postal unit, any contracted affiliate of the United States Postal Service
- Conférence des Présidents d'Université, an organization of university presidents in France

== Other uses ==
- Console Patron Units, the goddesses in Hyperdimension Neptunia
- Pichis Ashéninka language (ISO 639-3 code: cpu)
