= Palantla Chinantec =

Chinantecan language of Mexico

- Tlatepuzco Chinantec
- Native to: Mexico
- Region: Oaxaca
- Ethnicity: Chinantecs
- Native speakers: 25,000 (2007)
- Language family: Oto-Mangue: Western Oto-Mangue; Oto-Pame–Chinantecan; Chinantec; Palantla Chinantec

Language codes
- ISO 639-3: Either: cpa – Palantla Chinantec cvn – Valle Nacional Chinantec
- Glottolog: pala1351 Palantla vall1253 Valle Nacional
- ELP: Lower Central Chinantec

Palantla Chinantec, also known as Chinanteco de San Pedro Tlatepuzco, is a major Chinantecan language of Mexico, spoken in San Juan Palantla and a couple dozen neighboring towns in northern Oaxaca. The variety of San Mateo Yetla, known as Valle Nacional Chinantec, has marginal mutual intelligibility.

A grammar and a dictionary have been published.

== Phonology ==
=== Vowels ===
	Front	Central	Back	
	Front	Central	unrounded	rounded
Close	i		ɯ	u
Mid	ɛ		ɤ	o
Open		a		

Close vowels /i u/ typically are articulated as more open [ɪ ʊ] and are realized as more closed when represented by different tones. The close back vowel /ɯ/ tends to be articulated as [ə] when present in vowel clusters following /u/, or when preceding the /j/ consonant, and may also have a higher central sound. The mid back vowel /ɤ/ tends to be articulated as [ɜ] or [ɨ] when preceding a /w/ consonant. The low central vowel /a/ tends to be realized as [ɐ] following /i/ when one of the consonants /t l n/ occurs.

Each vowel can be nasalized as /ĩ ɯ̃ ũ ɛ̃ ɤ̃ õ ã/. The language is unusual in having, for some speakers, a three-way contrast between non-nasalized, lightly nasalized, and heavily nasalized vowels.

Stress tones may include either high or low /v́ v̀/ tones.

=== Consonants ===
		Labial	Alveolar	Palatal	Velar	Glottal
Nasal		m	n		ŋ	
Plosive	voiceless	p	t		k	ʔ
Plosive	voiced	b	d		ɡ	ʔ
Affricate	voiceless		t͡s			
Affricate	voiced		d͡z			
Fricative		ɸ	s			h
Approximant		w	l	j		
Rhotic			r			
