= Chiltepec-Tlacoatzintepec Chinantec =

Chinantecan language of Mexico

- Native to: Mexico
- Region: Oaxaca
- Ethnicity: Chinantecs
- Native speakers: (1,800? cited 2000)
- Language family: Oto-Mangue: Western Oto-Mangue; Oto-Pame–Chinantecan; Chinantec; Chiltepec-Tlacoatzintepec Chinantec

Language codes
- ISO 639-3: Either: csa – Chiltepec Chinantec ctl – Tlacoatzintepec Chinantec
- Glottolog: tlac1238
- ELP: Northwestern Chinantec

Chiltepec-Tlacoatzintepec Chinantec is a Chinantecan language of Mexico, spoken in northern Oaxaca in the towns of San José Chiltepec, San Juan Bautista Tlacoatzintepec, San Pedro Alianza, Santiago Quetzalapa, and San Juan Zapotitlán. The two principal varieties, Chinantec and Tlacoatzintepec, have marginal mutual intelligibility. They are close to Sochiapan Chinantec.

== Phonology ==
The following are sounds of Tlacoatzintepec Chinantec:

=== Consonants ===
		Bilabial	Interdental	Alveolar	Velar	Laryngeal
Stop	Voiceless	p		t	k	ʔ
Stop	Voiced	(b)			ɡ	
Affricate				ts		
Nasal		m		n	ŋ	
Fricative	Voiceless	(ɸ)	θ	s		h
Fricative	Voiced		ð			
Lateral				l		
Flap				ɾ		

1. Parenthesised sounds are loans, allophones, or free variants
2. /r/ is an alveolar flap in unstressed syllable; a retroflexed alveopalatal grooved affricate in a stressed syllable
3. /t, ts, θ, l, s, n, ŋ, k, ɡ, h/ can be palatalised before the semivowel /j/
4. /p, ŋ, k, ɡ, h/ can be labialised before the semivowel /w/

=== Vowels ===
	Front	Central	Back
High	i		ɨ • u
Mid	e		ɘ • o
Low		a	

1. Vowels to the left of the bullet dot are unrounded; to the right rounded
