= Santiago Yaveo =

- Municipality and town
- Location in Mexico
- Coordinates: 17°20′N 95°42′W
- Country: Mexico
- State: Oaxaca

Area
  - Total: 1,315.37 km^{2} (507.87 sq mi)
- Elevation: 440 m (1,440 ft)

Population (2005)
  - Total: 5,503
- Time zone: UTC-6 (Central Standard Time)

Santiago Yaveo is a town and municipality in Oaxaca in south-western Mexico. It is in the east of the Choapam District in the south of the Papaloapan Region.

== Geography ==
The municipality covers an area of 1,315.37 km^{2}. The western part lies in the Sierra Mixe, while most of the district to the east is in the flat coastal plain of the Gulf of Mexico. The climate is warm. Average temperature is 24 °C with rain from June to September. Flowing through the municipality the Tabla stream turns into the Chisme river. The Puxmecatán river forms the boundary with the neighboring municipality of San Juan Cotzocón.

== Demography ==
As of 2005, the municipality had 1,256 households with a total population of 5,503 of whom 1,384 spoke indigenous languages.

All communities now have potable water and electricity, but there are no formal sewers other than some septic tanks. Houses are typically built of brick or cement block adobe, with dirt floors and palm thatch roofs. The main cash crop is coffee, but the people grow corn, peppers, squash, beans, green beans, chayote, banana, pineapple, lentils and lemon for their own consumption. Some own livestock for personal use, and some supplement their diet through fishing and hunting. A plan was announced in 1996 to establish eucalyptus plantations to supply the paper industry.

== History ==
The municipality was established on 15 March 1825. The first primary school was built in 1975, and a health clinic was established in 1978. In 1989 electricity was introduced, and in 1994 a "tele-secondary" school was created. Potable water supplies were introduced in 1998.

In February 2010 there were threats of violence to eject unpopular politicians after a disputed election result. In March 2010 there was a confrontation between armed farmers and villagers over the use of municipal land in which serious injuries were sustained. The villagers had moved in and started clearing land for cultivation that the farmers had obtained by sale from the authorities. In May 2010 three brothers were shot dead in the Nuevo Ocotlán community.
