= Lalana-Tepinapa Chinantec =

Chinantecan language of Mexico

- Native to: Mexico
- Region: Oaxaca
- Ethnicity: Chinantecs
- Native speakers: (23,000 cited 2000)
- Language family: Oto-Mangue: Western Oto-Mangue; Oto-Pame–Chinantecan; Chinantec; Lalana-Tepinapa Chinantec

Language codes
- ISO 639-3: Either: cnl – Lalana Chinantec cte – Tepinapa Chinantec
- Glottolog: lala1270 Lalana tepi1241 Tepinapa

Lalana-Tepinapa Chinantec is a Chinantecan language of Mexico, spoken in 30 towns in a remote region along the Oaxaca–Veracruz border. Outlying varieties of Lalana and Tepinapa Chinantec have only marginal intelligibility with each other. A third of speakers are monolingual.
