= Guerrero Amuzgo language =

Amuzgo language of Mexico

Guerrero Amuzgo
- Ñomndaa
- Native to: Mexico
- Region: Guerrero
- Native speakers: 46,000 (2011)
- Language family: Oto-Manguean: Amuzgoan; Guerrero Amuzgo

Language codes
- ISO 639-3: amu
- Glottolog: guer1243
- ELP: Guerrero Amuzgo

The Guerrero Amuzgo language is an Amuzgo language spoken in southwest Guerrero state in Mexico.

== Statistics and history ==
There are 23,000 speakers, 10,000 that are monolingual. It is also known as Nomndaa or Ñomndaa. It belongs to the Oto-Manguean language family and the Amuzgoan subfamily. The use of the language is widespread and it is learned as a second language by Spanish and Nahuatl speakers living with the Guerrero speakers.

There is a positive cultural affinity toward the tongue and it is used in business, religion, and taught bilingually with Spanish until 6th grade. 10% of adults and 15% of children are literate in Amuzgo Guerrero. There are media such as videos, a dictionary and radio broadcasts in the language that propagate its use.

== Phonology ==
=== Vowels ===
Oral/Nasal vowels
| | Front | | Central | | Back | |
| | oral | nasal | oral | nasal | oral | nasal |
|---|---|---|---|---|---|---|
| Close | i | ĩ | | | u | ũ |
| Close-mid | e | ẽ | | | o | õ |
| Open-mid | æ | æ̃ | | | ɔ | ɔ̃ |
| Open | æ | æ̃ | a | ã | | |

Laryngealized vowels
| | Front | | Central | | Back | |
| | oral | nasal | oral | nasal | oral | nasal |
|---|---|---|---|---|---|---|
| Close | ḭ | ḭ̃ | | | ṵ | ṵ̃ |
| Close-mid | ḛ | ḛ̃ | | | o̰ | õ̰ |
| Open-mid | æ̰ | æ̰̃ | | | ɔ̰ | ɔ̰̃ |
| Open | æ̰ | æ̰̃ | a̰ | ã̰ | | |

- Sounds /æ, æ̃, æ̰, æ̰̃/ can also fluctuate to more mid sounds [ɛ, ɛ̃, ɛ̰, ɛ̰̃].

=== Consonants ===
| | | Labial | Alveolar | Post- alveolar | Velar | | Glottal |
| | | Labial | Alveolar | Post- alveolar | central | labial | Glottal |
|---|---|---|---|---|---|---|---|
| Nasal | | m | n | ɲ | | | |
| Plosive | voiceless | (p) | t | tʲ | k kʲ | kʷ | ʔ |
| Plosive | prenasal | (ᵐb) | ⁿd | ⁿdʲ | ᵑɡ | ᵑɡʷ | |
| Affricate | | | ts | tʃ | | | |
| Fricative | | β | s | ʃ | | | h |
| Lateral | | | l | | | | |
| Rhotic | tap | | ɾ | | | | |
| Rhotic | trill | | (r) | | | | |
| Approximant | | w | | j | | | |

Sounds [p, ᵐb, r] only appear in a few words.
