= Santiago Choápam =

- Municipality and town
- Location in Mexico
- Coordinates: 17°22′N 95°55′W
- Country: Mexico
- State: Oaxaca
- District: Choapam District

Area
  - Total: 312.107 km^{2} (120.505 sq mi)

Population (2010)
  - Total: 5,413
- Time zone: UTC-6 (Central Standard Time)

Santiago Choápam (or Choapan) is a town and municipality in Oaxaca in southern Mexico.

== Geography ==
The municipality covers an area of 312.1 km^{2}. It is part of the Choapam District in the south of the Papaloapan Region. Communities include Santiago Choápam, San Juan del Río, Santa María Yahuivé, Maninaltepec, San Yaveloxi Jacinto, San Juan Teotalcingo and Santo Domingo.

The municipality is on average 840 meters above sea level, with a hot and humid climate and a wet summer. The main rivers are the Lágrimas River and the Santa María Yahuive River. The forests contain cedar, avocado, mahogany and pine, mosses, ferns and palms. There is a great variety of wildlife, including bobcats or ocelots, puma, jaguar, fox, skunk and deer. Freshwater crab and shrimp are found the in streams and rivers.

== Demography ==
As of 2010, the municipality had 1,244 households with a total population of 5,413. Of these 45.1% spoke an indigenous language, mostly Choapan Zapotec but with Chinantec minorities. Most people are engaged in agriculture, growing Manila mangos, banana, orange, lemon, sugar cane, custard apple, sweet potato and granaditas, or in forestry. Some cattle breeding is also practiced. There is no industry, and negligible tourism.
