= Ricardo Elizondo Elizondo =

Mexican writer (1950–2013)

- Born: January 26, 1950; Monterrey, Mexico
- Died: August 24, 2013 (aged 63); Monterrey, Mexico
- Occupations: Writer, archivist
- Writing career
- Language: Spanish

Ricardo Elizondo Elizondo (January 26, 1950–August 24, 2013) was a writer, playwright, historian and archivist, whose work concentrated on preserving and promoting the culture of northeastern Mexico. Several of his books won awards and other recognitions in Mexico and abroad.

== Life ==
Elizondo was the fourth of six children of Aurora Elizondo of Huinalá and Guadalupe Elizondo of Monterrey proper. Elizondo's father was a worker and union leader at the Fundidora de Fierro y Acero de Monterrey. His mother had served as an arbiter in water disputes in her town.

Elizondo's interest in words and stories both fiction and non-fiction began when he was a child. His great grandparents on his mother's side told him many stories of the area, including battles against the indigenous of the area that were still ongoing at the end of the 19th century. This experience formed the basis of his literary development. He began writing stories in his free time since the sixth grade, when he decided he wanted to be a writer. He also began a project of the vocabulary and speech of his region's Spanish, which would eventually become the book Lexicon del Noreste. Another major influence on his writing was the death of his sister, who was run over by a car when she was seven. The loss shook the family, especially Elizondo, making him more sensible to death, according to his brother Carlos.

Although he knew he wanted to be a writer, his family was practical. He attended the Colegio Civil and then went on to study public accounting at the Monterrey Institute of Technology and Higher Studies, graduating in 1975. He did study humanities for a time at UNAM, but he did not finish this degree. Later in life, he would earn a masters in humanities from Universidad de Monterrey and a doctorate in history from the Iberoamericana University.

Elizondo retired from his administrative career, but wrote until his death of cancer, which he battled unsuccessfully for two years.

== Career ==
Elizondo wrote novels, short stories, plays, works on history and biographies. He first started published short stories about Huinalá and other communities in newspapers when he was seventeen. In the mid-1970s, he was working as an accountant with the Bank of Mexico, when he met writer Juan José Arreola at a café in Mexico City. He presented some of his short stories to the writer, who had a reputation for supporting young talent, who pronounced Elizondo's work "pure silver." Elizondo wrote for the El Norte and El Porvenir newspapers, wrote biographies of José Vasconcelos and Martín Luis Guzmán along with histories of businesses and institutions.

Elizondo also had an administrative and academic career which spanned over three decades. In 1975, he became the director of the General Archives of the State of Nuevo León, continuing until 1979. In 1980 he became the director of Monterrey Tech's special collections, called the Cervantine Library. His career with the institution as head librarian and professor spanned 32 years. He retired from this position two years before his death because of his health.

Elizondo was a member of the Academia Mexicana de la Lengua, as well as a member of the Mexican committee of the Memory of the World Programme (UNESCO).

== Writing style ==
Elizondo's style was costumbrista, chronicling life and change in the towns and cities of his border region. He was one of five authors in the 1980s particularly noted for writing about desert life in northern Mexico, which was named "narrativo del desierto" (desert narrative), along with Daniel Sada of Baja California, Gerardo Cornejo of Sonora, Jesus Gardea of Chihuahua and Serverino Salazar of Zacatecas. His first book was a collection of short stories, Relatos de Mar, Desierto y Muerte (Stories of the Sea, Desert and Death), published in 1980.

Several of his works won prizes and other recognitions. Ocurrencias de Don Quijote (1992) received five international awards. Relatos de mar, desierto y muerte received the Premio Nacional de Cuento in 1980. Setenta veces siete won the Premio Colima from the Instituto Nacional de Bellas Artes in 1987. Books such as Narcedalia Piedrotas (1993) and Setenta veces siete (1987) can be found on college syllabi.

He had a passion for photography, which he inherited from his father. In addition to taking photographs, he had a large collection of them from the 19th century. His photographic work made its way into books such as Monterrey, una vision fotográfica, Regiomontanos 1900 and Polvo de aquellos lodos. In 1999, he wrote a commemorative edition on the Palace of Lecumberri on its 100th anniversary (Lecumberri, ángel y escorpión: galería fotográfica del ultimo día) which documented the conversion of the building from prison to the General Archives of the Nation.

== Work ==
- Setenta veces siete (Seventy times seven)
- Narcedalia Piedrotas
- Lexicón del noreste de México (Lexicón of northeastern Mexico)
- Polvo de aquellos lodos (Dust of the sludge)

== Mentions and national and international recognition ==
- 1988 Britannica Book of the Year. Encyclopædia Britannica, Inc. Chicago, Auckland, Geneve, London, Manila, Paris, Rome, Seoul, Sydney, Tokyo, Toronto. 1989.
- New Writing from Mexico. Edited by Reginald Gibbons. Triquarterly Books. Northwestern University. 1992
- Dictionary of Spanish Literature. Directed by Ricardo Gullón. Alianza Editorial. Madrid, Spain. 1992.
- Dictionary of Mexican writers of the twentieth century. National Autonomous University of Mexico. Mexico DF 1992.
- Anthology of twentieth century Mexican narrative. Christopher Michel Dominguez. Economic Culture Fund. Mexico DF 1991.
- The new historical novel in Latin America, 1979-1992. Seymour Menton. Economic Culture Fund. Mexico DF 1993.
- The word game: New Mexican story. Lauro Zavala. University of the State of Mexico. 1993.
- This Mexican narrative. Vincent F. Torres. UAM. Mexico DF 1991.
