= South Ucayali Ashéninka =

Arawakan language

Ashéninka South Ucayali
- Native to: Peru
- Native speakers: 13,000 (2002)
- Language family: Arawakan: Southern; Campa; Ashéninka; Ashéninka South Ucayali

Language codes
- ISO 639-3: cpy
- Glottolog: sout3127

South Ucayali Ashéninka is an indigenous American language spoken along Peru's Upper Ucayali river. There is a 15% literacy rate; it is an official language.
