= Ballistic syllable =

Phonemic distinction

Ballistic syllables are a phonemic distinction in Otomanguean languages: Chinantec and Amuzgo. They have been described as characterized with increased sub-glottal pressure (Mugele 1982) or laryngeal abduction (Silverman 1994). The acoustic effect is a fortis release of the consonant, a gradual surge in the intensity of the vowel, followed by a rapid decay in intensity into post-vocalic aspiration. They may thus be a form of phonation.

Non-ballistic syllables are, by contrast, called "controlled."

See Chinantec of Ozumacín for examples.
