= Cervantine Library =

Library in Monterrey, Nuevo León, Mexico

Cervantine Library (Biblioteca Cervantina)
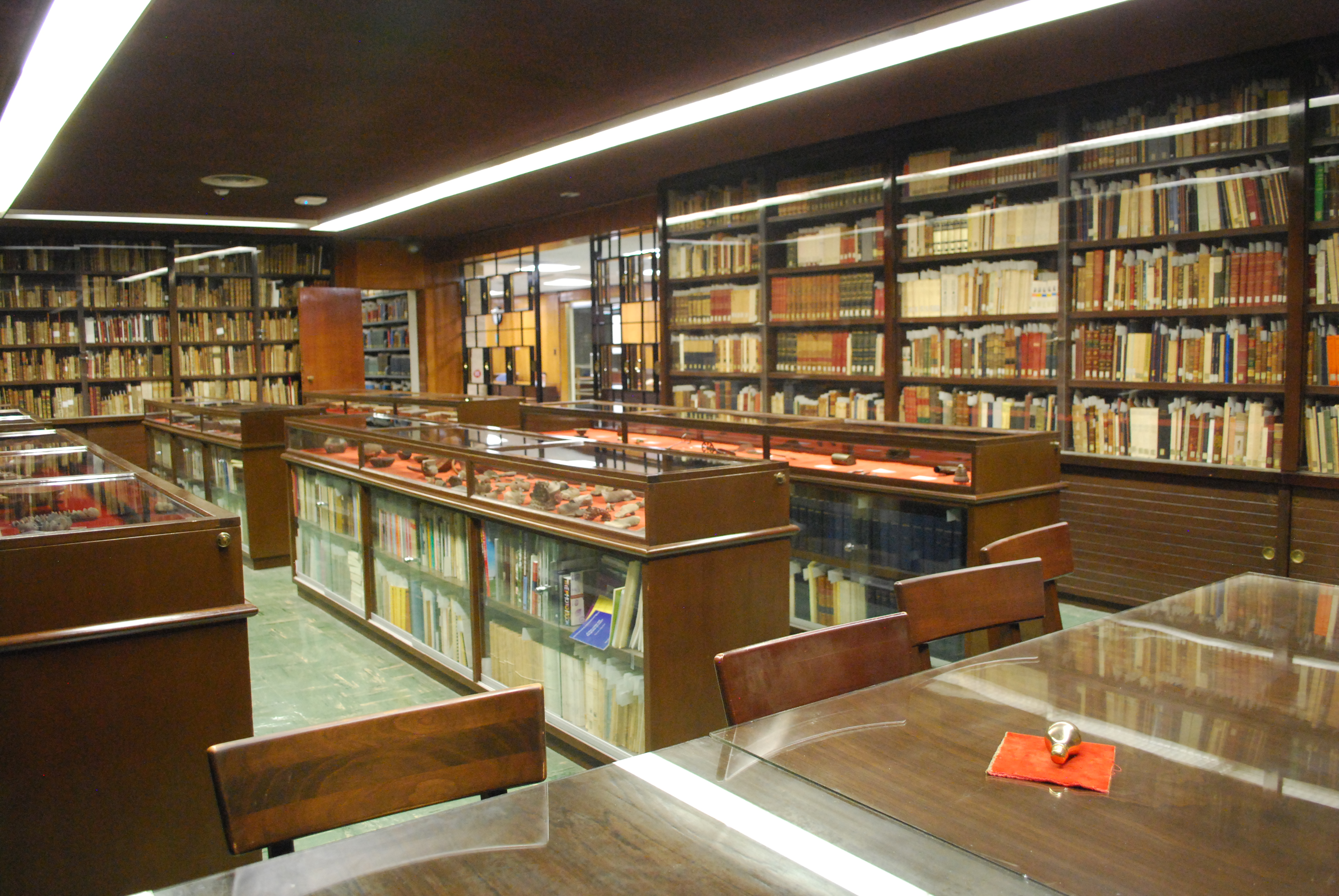
- Part of the collection of the library in the main administration building
- 25°39′5.25″N 100°17′27.78″W
- Location: Monterrey, Mexico
- Established: 1953

Collection
- Size: 130,000 approx.

Other information
- Website: www.patrimoniocultural.com.mx

The Cervantine Library Spanish: Biblioteca Cervantina (also known as the Library Miguel de Cervantes) is a library located on the main campus of Tecnológico de Monterrey, in the city of Monterrey, Nuevo León, Mexico.The library has about 130,000 items in its collection, with its holdings on Mexican history and culture ranked second in the Americas. It also houses series of photographs covering the history of Mexico and Monterrey during the 19th and 20th centuries.

Since 1998, the library has worked to digitalize its collection and put it online.

== History ==
The origins and mainstay of the library has been donations of personal and private collections of books, documents, photographs and more to the Monterrey Institute of Technology and Higher Education (ITESM). The first works arrived shortly after the institution was established in 1943. Initially, they were simply stored at the Monterrey campus. This changed when one day in 1954 the founder of ITESM, Eugenio Garza Sada, happened to be at the general library and asked library director Eugenio del Hoyo what he was doing unpacking a set of boxes which contained manuscripts from the 16th to 18th century. Del Hoyo's response was “I am discovering treasures.” Garza decided that these documents, eventually known as the Conway Collection, deserved a space worthy of them and were moved to a space on the second floor of the main administration building of the institution.

Del Hoyo became the new collection/library's first director, serving in that role until 1979. The name of the library come from one of the first donations, that of about 1,000 copies of Don Quixote donated by a Monterrey businessman. Under Del Hoyo the nascent library continued to receive donations, but this accelerated under the second director, Elregio.

Ricardo Elizondo Elizondo was a writer and historian along with operating the library for 32 years before retiring in 2011. Under his term, the library's holdings tripled in size and began specialized archives for photography, maps and even archeological pieces. It also began a long and continuing process of cataloging privately held donations which has uncovered and consolidated rare and one-of-a-kind books from the 16th century and even some dating before 1501.

The original space in the administration building was allotted without thought to the growth of the collection, which has led to elements being housed in different buildings on campus and even to other campuses of the ITESM system. By the time, Elizondo retired, he stated that calling it the Cervantine Library was a misnomer as the library contains resources far beyond the writing of Cervantes, or even literature.

In addition to increasing the library's physical holdings, Elizondo worked to promote knowledge and access to the collections. In 1993, the library received a visit from Nobel Prize winner Octavio Paz. Elizondo became a member of Mexico's committee for UNESCO's Memory of the World program, with the purpose of proposing collections for their inclusion. His efforts resulted in two collections being accepted. The first was a digitalizing project in conjunction with the National Autonomous University of Mexico called Primeros Libros (First Books) to put 16th century book collections into electronic formats.

Daniel Sanabria became the third director in 2011. Under his watch, a second collection of the library was accepted into the Memory of the World program, a photographic archive of works by architect Mario Pani Darqui. This archive documents 40 years of his career.

The library continues to promote its resources and collaborate with outside institutions. These include the Miguel de Cervantes Saavedra Virtual Library Foundation (of the University of Aliante in Spain), the Virtual Library of Mexican Letters, SINAFO, RABID and it is a member of the Asociación Mexicana de Archivos y Bibliotecas Privadas.

Space continues to be an issue for the library. In 2017, director Daniel Sanabria left the library over disagreements over new library spaces and other issues related to the care of the collection.

== The collections ==
Manuscript on the life of Anthony of Padua dated 1605

The total number of items related to the library's collection is estimated at 130,000, but the exact number is not known as past donations are still being cataloged. About half of the library's collection is related to Mexican history and culture, a quarter to language and literature and the rest to various disciplines such as medicine, travel logs, architecture and art. Its collection related to Mexican history is second only to that of the University of Texas. The library's holding are a series of special collections, donated by private individuals and entities and include old and rare books, documents, photographs, microfilm, maps, archeological pieces and colonial ironwork. The oldest written records in the collection include eight books printed before 1501 (incunables) and 85 printed in Mexico in the 16th century. The oldest printed book is a History of Venice (in Latin) published in 1490 and the oldest manuscript dates to 1452. The eight incunables are History of Florence (1476), Book of Psalms (1478), Sermones Roberti de Licio de Laudibus Sanctorum (1490), Comentarios a Santo Tomás (1492), Columbus’ Second Letter (1494), Adagios by Erasmus (1500), and Comienca la Contienda del Cuerpo y Alma (1500). The last was discovered among the categorization process only in 2010. It is the last medieval poem written in Spanish and the only copy of the work by Anton de Meta known to exist. Other important elements in the collection include the first missal published in the Americas (1576), a book on the Passion of Christ in the Purhepecha language (pre-1800) which was saved from the local parish during the eruption of the Paracutin volcano, one related to the presidential election of 1910 signed by author Francisco I. Madero and 80 original works by Juan de Palafox y Mendoza, the second most important collection of such works after the Palafoxiana Library in Puebla. The collection contains a significant number of colonial era books in Mexico's various indigenous languages, as well as books in European languages other than Spanish and even some from Asia as well. The Guajardo Collection has 500 works written by foreigners living in Mexico during the colonial period. The archeological pieces were donate by Grupo Lamosa, along with 258 pieces of colonial-era ironwork. Most of the archeological pieces are from the Mexica culture and almost all are from the center and south of the country.

The microfilm collection contains about 2,000 rolls of microfilm. They are mostly civil and church records from 50 communities in the northeast of Mexico, especially in Nuevo León, Coahuila and Zacatecas. Part of the Sandoval-Lagrange photography collections are on these microfilms as well as ITESM student records from 1943 to 1972.

There are 47 distinct collections of the library, organized mostly by donor. The Conway Collection was one of the first donations to the library, containing over 5,000 volumes in Spanish and English, along with over 20,000 manuscripts dating from the 16th to 18th centuries. English language items include The Americas and the Annual Reports of the Bureau of Ethnology along with writings by Irishman Guillen de Lampart, who led a colorful life in Mexico ending with his execution there in 1659. Manuscripts date from the Conquest to the Porfirio Díaz era. The collection was also the source of the library's oldest book.

The Cervantine Collection is the source of the libraries name. It consists of over 1,000 copies of Don Quixote in various languages and from various eras donated by Monterrey businessman Carlos Prieto. Language versions include those in English, French, German, Italian, Catalan, Portuguese, Dutch, Hebrew, Latin, Korean and Mongolian. The collection also include one from Brussels dated 1607, one from Milan dated 1610 and one from 1957 with illustrations by Salvador Dalí.

The Salvador Ugarte Collection os one of the most valuable in Mexico, containing works printed in the country in the 16th century, including one of the largest collections of materials in indigenous languages of that era, with about 700 works. It also include Christopher Columbus's Second Letter dated 1494 and the only complete collection of Gazeta de México from 1722 to 1822.

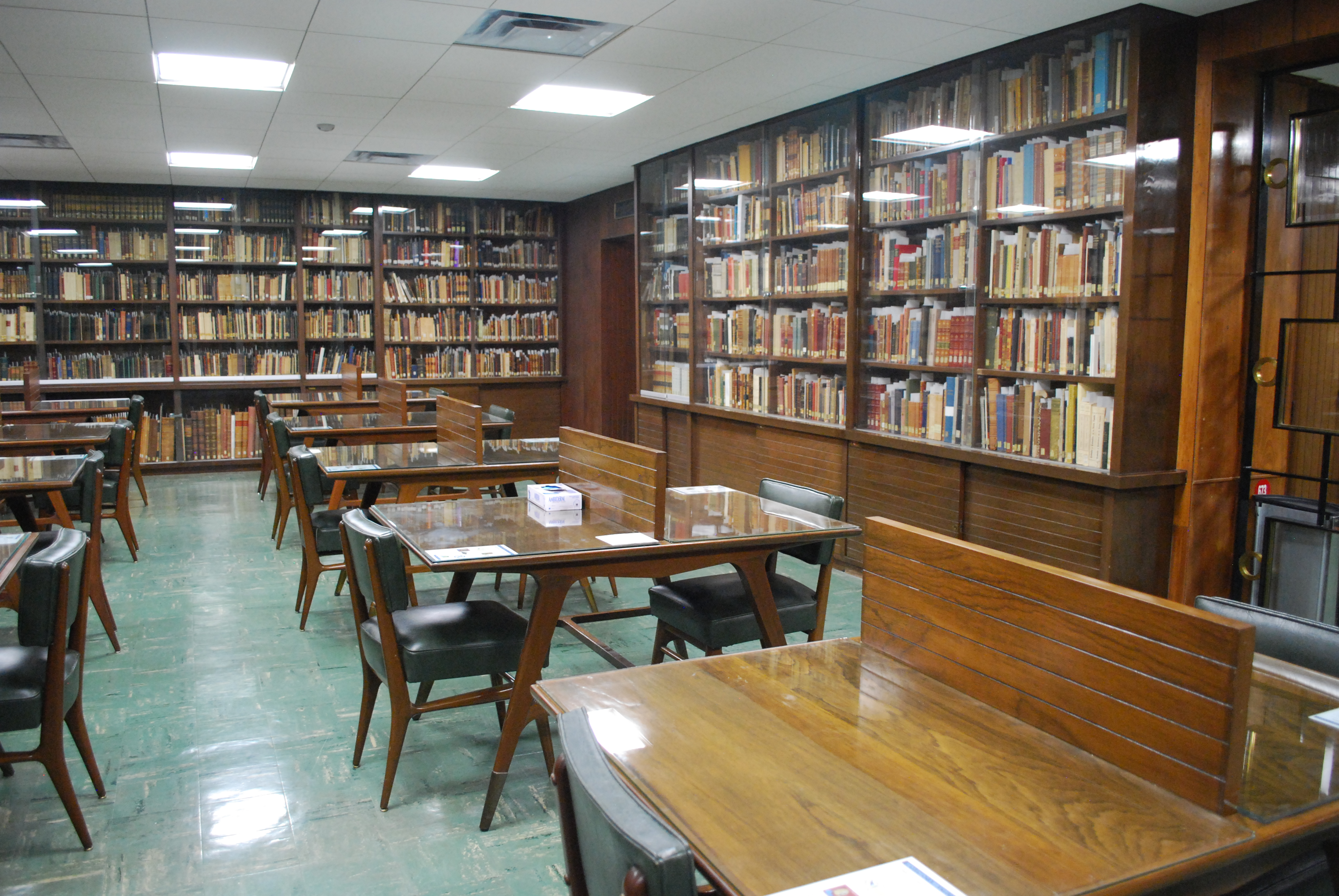
Consultation room

The 45,000 volumes of the Ignacio Bernal Collection was donated to the library by Grupo Cemex. This collection of works on Mexican history and culture made the Cervantine Library the second most important in the Americas in these areas. The collection was amassed by Dr. Ignacio Bernal over 60 years, starting with books inherited from his grandfathers and great grandfathers. The collection contains codices, original histories and other documents from all eras of Mexican history and some on Central American history. Colonial era works are mostly religious but also include those on history, travel logs and literature. The collection is estimated at $2 million USD.

The Agustin Basave collection contains about 2,000 historical documents and 700 photographs, including autographs of celebrities such as Judy Garland and Elizabeth Taylor.

The Pedro Robredo Collection has over 6,000 volumes on history, 100 of which are manuscripts It also includes a complete collection of the Actas de Cabildo (municipal council) of Mexico City from 1524 to 1903.

The Alonso Junco Collection has about 5,000 works, mostly on Mexican literature.

Photographic collections include Agustin Basave, Conde-Zambano, Alberto Flores, Desiderio Lagrange, Jesus R. Sandoval, Aureliano Tapia, Tecnológico, Campus Monterrey, Isauro Villarreal and Mario Pani. The Agustin Basave Collection consists of 750 prints taken and developed by photographers from around the world related to celebrities of the 20th century. The collection was originally that of the founder of the El Norte newspaper in Monterrey. The collection was donated to the Library in the 1970s.

The Conde-Zambrano Collection consists of studio photographs by various notable photographers from Mexico, the United States and Europe. There are about 3,500 photographs in 34 albums most from 1860 to 1890 depicting people and events related to Mexican high society. The collection was amassed by Ignacio Conde and donated by Lorenzo Zambrano. This collection includes one album with the imperial seal with over 600 photos of Emperor Maximilian and his wife Carlota. Another has a cover entirely of mother-of-pearl containing images of Benito Juarez and Porfirio Díaz, among others.

The Alberto Flores Varela Collection is that of the namesake, who was a photographer from 1919 to 1996. The main theme of his work is liturgical, with images of churches and clergy in and around the Monterrey area. The collection was donated in 1998 by the photographer.

The Desiderio Lagrange Collection contains photographs by the namesake and his brother Alfonso. Most of these photos focus on the city of Monterrey, its people and the areas around it. Most date to around 1870 although there are some as late as 1910. It was acquired by the institution in 1963 along with the Jesús R. Sandoval Collection.

The Jesús R. Sandoval Collection is that of the namesake who was a professional photographer until his death in 1951. These photos were donated mixed with those of Desiderio Lagrange, which together total 4,000 prints and 38,000 negatives. Most photos are from 1896 to 1940, with most being studio photographs.

The Aureliano Tapia Méndez Collection contains over 1,000 print photographs by the namesake and others. Most depict religious life in the Monterrey area from 1920 to the present.

The Tecnológico, Campus Monterrey Collection is that from the archives of the main campus of ITESM, with work by many different photographers. It has over 2,000 prints and growing. Most of the photographs are from 1943 to 1985. The archive is the result of many small donations.

The Isauro Villareal Garcia Collection contains work by the namesake, a businessman and amateur photographer. It consists of 712 prints and 90 negatives. Most are related to Monterrey landscape, both urban and rural, as well as local family life.

The Mario Pani Darqui Collection is related to one of Mexico's most famous architects and is registered in UNESCO's Memory of the World. The collection contains 2,900 photos on paper (including ones taken by the architect's father, Arturo Pani and photographer Guillermo Zamora), 1,400 photos on other media, 1,000 negatives, 56 architectural plans and drawings, 14 books of newspaper clippings, and 13 16 mm films. The collection documents the architect's career extending from 1911 to 1993 with most from 1934 to 1964. It was acquired by the library from Pani's daughter in 2012.

== Sites ==
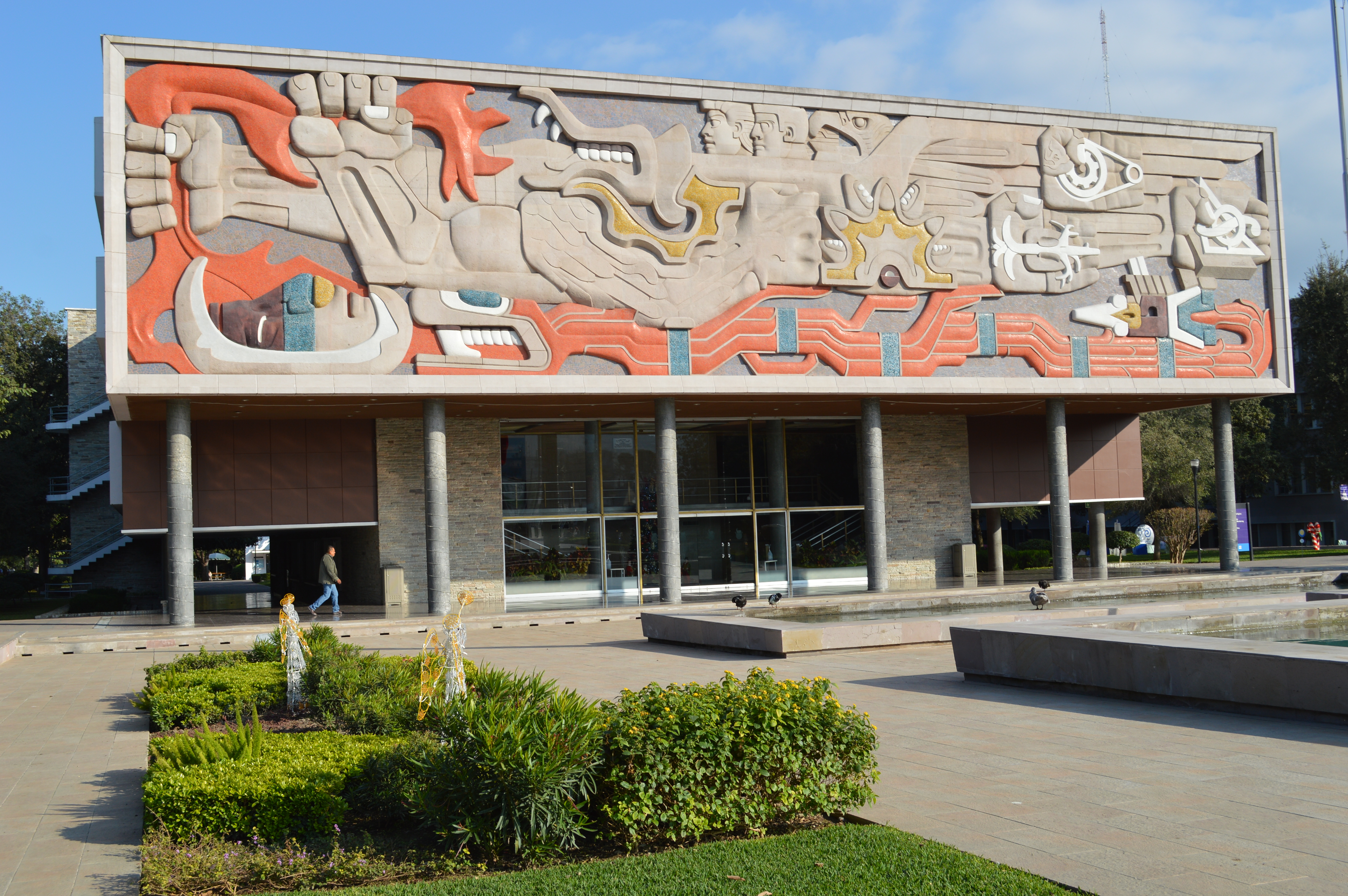
Main administration building which is the traditional home of the collection

From its inception in 1954 to the present, the collection has been centered on the second floor of the Monterrey campus's main administration building. The original intention was to house the entire collection in the one space, without planning for growth of the collection through new donations.

Today, most of the library's holdings are in other locations on the Monterrey campus and even on other campus, including the photographic and map collections as well as the Ignacio Bernal Collection.

In May 2017, the Monterrey campus opened a new library building with a section for the Cervantine Library, but this move has been controversial. Director Daniel Sanabria left the same year over disagreements over space and storage of the various collections. There are plans to move at least some of the collection from its traditional home, but school authorities insist that the traditional space in the administration building will continue to belong to the Cervantine Library.

== Projects and events ==
The library holds conferences, exhibitions and even art events related to the library's holdings.

Most recent efforts have revolved around the use modern technologies to preserve and promote the collection. Digitalization efforts began in 1998. The rise of the Internet prompted this effort as the library noticed a decline in visitors and it needed a way to make the collection more accessible to more people. Today the site received about 1,800 visitors per month, most from the United States, Mexico and China. They include researchers, graduate students and journalists. Most of the hits from China are from Spanish language students.

Digitalized works include many of the library's oldest documents, a collection of Mexican marriage licenses, baptism and criminal records for genealogy purposes and many of the holdings in or related to Mexico's indigenous languages. The first complete collection to be digitalized is that of architect Mario Pani, with almost 8,000 images.

In 1999, ITESM produced its first multimedia “book” called “Una navigación cervantina” on CD-ROM. This was followed by “Presentación de la Fototeca del Tecnológico de Monterrey” in 2002 and “Colección Cervantina” in 2005.

== See also ==
- List of libraries in Mexico
