= San Juan Bautista Valle Nacional =

- Municipality and town
- Location in Mexico
- Coordinates: 17°46′00″N 96°18′00″W
- Country: Mexico
- State: Oaxaca
- Founded: 1811
- Municipal Status: March 15, 1825

Government
  - Municipal President: Marcelo Santos Meneces (2008–2010)

Area
  - Land: 394.23 km^{2} (152.21 sq mi)
- Elevation: 60 m (200 ft)

Population (2005)
  - Total: 21,189
- Time zone: UTC-6 (Central Standard Time)

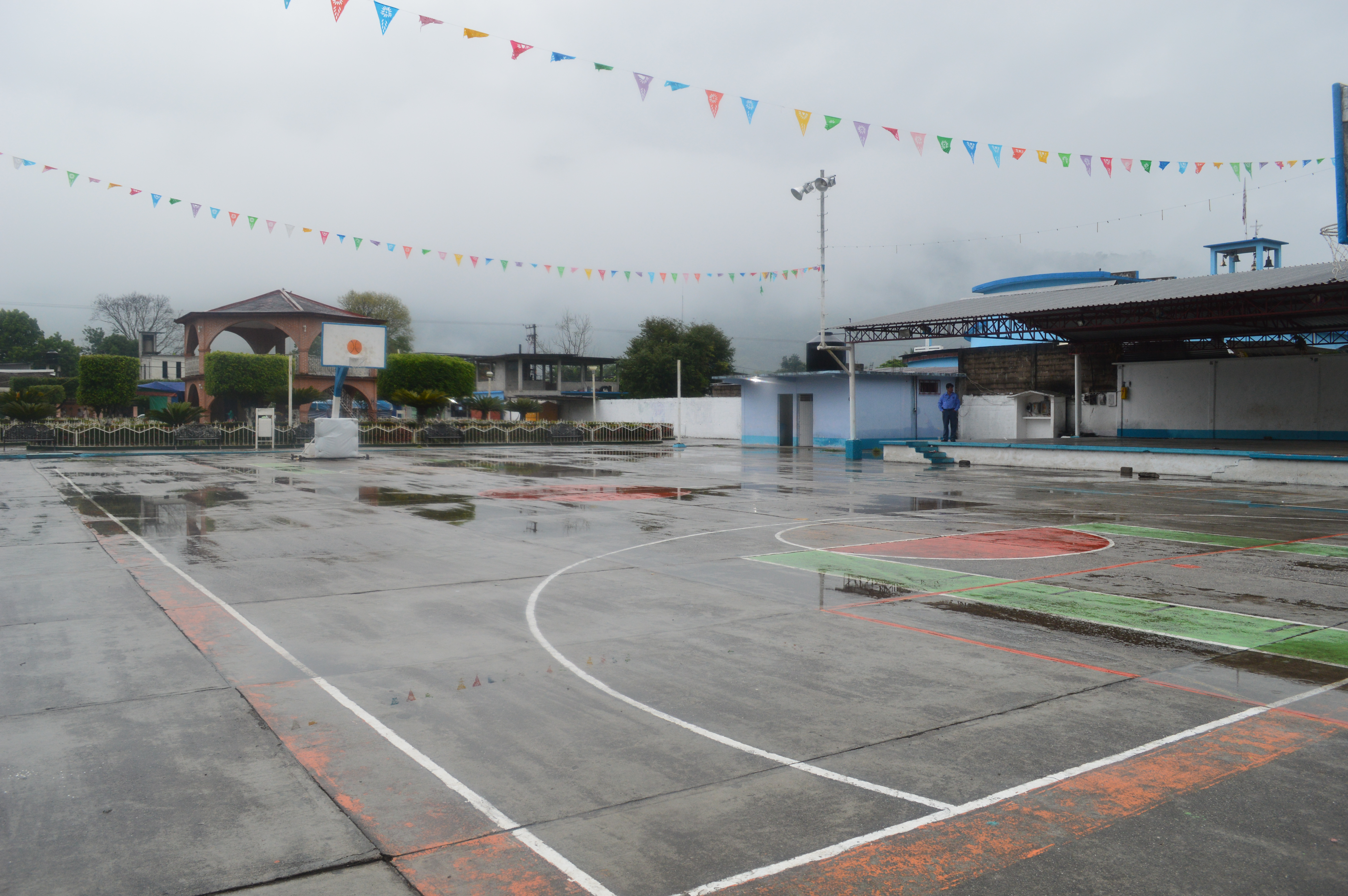
Main Plaza in Valley Nacional

San Juan Bautista Valle Nacional is a town and municipality in Oaxaca in south-western Mexico. The municipality covers an area of 394.23 km^{2} within the Sierra Juárez mountains. It is part of the Tuxtepec District of the Papaloapan Region. The town lies on the north bank of the Valle Nacional River, a tributary of the Papaloapan River.

As of 2005, the municipality had a total population of 21,189.

== History ==
In the prehispanic period, there was a Chinantec city-state called Chinantlan located here, which was the namesake of both the people and the Chinantla region. In addition to the typical Mesoamerican crops of maize, squash, beans, and chile, Chinantlan also cultivated achiote, cacao and zapotes. The rainy climate allowed for three harvests of maize annually. A post-contact relacion describes the town as almost vacant and most of the population being spread over a wide area of the countryside in hamlets and farms. There was a temple resembling a tower with 100 steps to the top, where sacrifices were carried out. Religious images were kept in a nearby cave where those undertaking penance would stay and fast for 100 days. During this fast, a person could not communicate with women and could only eat once per day. He would chew a resin from a tree called uli to help him endure his hunger. Chinantlan was conquered by the Aztec Empire, probably under Moctezuma I, and thereafter was home to Mexica officials who maintained order and oversaw tribute collection, which consisted of gold and cacao.
