= San José Chiltepec =

- Municipality and town
- Location in Mexico
- Coordinates: 17°56′N 96°10′W
- Country: Mexico
- State: Oaxaca

Area
  - Total: 204.13 km^{2} (78.82 sq mi)

Population (2005)
  - Total: 10,203
- Time zone: UTC-6 (Central Standard Time)

San José Chiltepec is a town and municipality in Oaxaca in south-western Mexico. The municipality covers an area of 204.13 km^{2}. It is part of the Tuxtepec District of the Papaloapan Region.

As of 2005, the municipality had a total population of 10,203.
