= Pichis Ashéninka =

Arawakan language

Ashéninka Pichis
- Native to: Peru
- Native speakers: (12,000 cited 2001)
- Language family: Arawakan: Southern; Campa; Ashéninka; Ashéninka Pichis

Language codes
- ISO 639-3: cpu
- Glottolog: pich1237

Ashéninka Pichis is an indigenous American language spoken along Peru's Pichis river. There is a 30% literacy rate; it is an official language.
