= Nasal vowel =

Pronunciation of a vowel through the nose as well as the mouth

Nasal

◌̃
- IPA number: 424

Encoding
- Entity (decimal): &#771;
- Unicode (hex): U+0303

A nasal vowel is a vowel that is produced with a lowering of the soft palate (or velum) so that the air flow escapes through the nose and the mouth simultaneously, as in the French vowel /ɑ̃/ or Amoy [ɛ̃]. By contrast, oral vowels are produced without nasalization.

Nasalized vowels are vowels influenced by nearby sounds. For instance, the [æ] of the word hand in English is affected by the following nasal consonant. In most languages, vowels adjacent to nasal consonants are produced partially or fully with a lowered velum in a natural process of assimilation and are therefore technically nasal, but few speakers would notice. That is the case in English: vowels preceding nasal consonants are nasalized, but there is no phonemic distinction between nasal and oral vowels, and all vowels are considered phonemically oral.

Some languages contrast oral vowels and nasalized vowels phonemically. Linguists make use of minimal pairs to decide whether or not the nasality is of linguistic importance. In French, for instance, nasal vowels are distinct from oral vowels, and words can differ by the vowel quality. The words beau /bo/ "beautiful" and bon /bɔ̃/ "good" are a minimal pair that contrasts primarily the vowel nasalization even though the /ɔ̃/ from bon is slightly more open.

Portuguese allows nasal diphthongs, which contrast with their oral counterparts, like the pair mau /ˈmaw/ "bad" and mão /ˈmɐ̃w̃/ "hand".

Although there are French loanwords in English with nasal vowels like croissant [ˈkɹwɑːsɒ̃], there is no expectation that an English-speaker would nasalize the vowels to the same extent as French-speakers or Portuguese-speakers. Likewise, pronunciation keys in English dictionaries do not always indicate nasalization of French or Portuguese loanwords.

== Influence on vowel height ==
Nasalization as a result of the assimilation of a nasal consonant tends to cause a raising of vowel height; phonemically distinctive nasalization tends to lower the vowel. According to a different assessment, high vowels do tend to be lowered, but low vowels tend to be raised instead.

In most languages, vowels of all heights are nasalized indiscriminately, but preference occurs in some languages, such as for high vowels in Chamorro and low vowels in Thai.

== Degree of nasalization ==
A few languages, such as Palantla Chinantec, contrast lightly nasalized and heavily nasalized vowels. They may be contrasted in print by doubling the IPA diacritic for nasalization: ⟨ẽ⟩ vs ⟨ẽ̃⟩. Bickford & Floyd (2006) combine the tilde with the ogonek: ⟨ẽ⟩ vs ⟨ę̃⟩. (The ogonek is sometimes used in an otherwise IPA transcription to avoid conflict with tone diacritics above the vowels.)

== Origin ==
Rodney Sampson described a three-stage historical account, explaining the origin of nasal vowels in modern French. The notation of Terry and Webb is used below, where V, N, and Ṽ (with a tilde above) represent oral vowel, nasal consonant, and nasal vowel, respectively.

Historical development of French nasal vowels by century
Stage 1	Stage 2	Stage 3
c. 13th	c. 14th–16th	c. 17th–18th
vend [vẽnt], [vɑ̃nt]	[vɑ̃(n)t]	[vɑ̃]

In the Old French period, vowels became nasalized under the regressive assimilation, as VN > ṼN. In the Middle French period, the realization of the nasal consonant became variable, as VN > Ṽ(N). As the language evolves into its modern form, the consonant is no longer realized, as ṼN > Ṽ.

Worldwide there is a tendency for languages to gain nasal vowels through the simplification or lenition of consonantal onsets containing a nasal. Some of these changes are as follows:

Lakkia	*P̥mV > P̥wṼ; *P̥nV > P̥rṼ; *P̥ɲV, *P̥ŋV > P̥jṼ
Breton	*P̥nV > P̥rṼ
Goidelic	*P̥NV > P̥rṼ; *P̬NV > P̬rṼ; *mnV > mrṼ
Kwa	*ȻVNV > ȻNV > ȻṼ
Mon (Photharam)	tŋV > h̰w̃Ṽ
Northern Sui	ʔN > ʔṼ or h̰Ṽ
Naish	*smV > h̰Ṽ
Mienic & Loloish	*N̥V > h̰Ṽ; *NV > ɦ̰Ṽ
Tamang	NV in free variation with ɦ̰Ṽ

Where "P" and "Ȼ" represent a plosive and an obstruent, respectively.

== Orthography ==
Languages written with Latin script may indicate nasal vowels by a trailing silent n or m, as is the case in French, Portuguese, Lombard (central classic orthography), Bamana, Breton, Occitan and Yoruba.

In other cases, they are indicated by diacritics. In the International Phonetic Alphabet, nasal vowels are denoted by a tilde over the symbol for the vowel. The same practice can be found in Portuguese marking with a tilde in diphthongs (e.g. põe) and for words ending in /ɐ̃/ (e.g. manhã, irmã). While the tilde is also used for this purpose in Paraguayan Guaraní, phonemic nasality is indicated by a diaeresis ( ¨ ) in the standardized orthographies of most varieties of Tupí-Guaraní spoken in Bolivia. Polish, Navajo, and Elfdalian use a hook under the letter, called an ogonek, as in ą, ę. The Pe̍h-ōe-jī romanization of Taiwanese Hokkien and Amoy uses a superscript n (aⁿ, eⁿ, ...). In the orthography of the First Grammatical Treatise for the Old Icelandic language, nasal vowels are indicated with a dot above the vowel grapheme: a /ɑ/ vs ȧ /ɑ̃/, ǫ /ɔ/ vs ǫ̇ /ɔ̃/, e /e/ vs. ė /ẽ/ vs ę /ɛ/ vs. ę̇ /ɛ̃/, ı /i/ vs i /ĩ/, o /o/ vs ȯ /õ/, ø /ø/ vs. ø̇ /ø̃/, u /u/ vs u̇ /ũ/, y /y/ vs ẏ /ỹ/; the ogonek instead indicates retracted tongue root or tense vowels, cf. ǫ /ɔ/ vs o /o/ and e /e/ vs. ę /ɛ/.

=== Arabic scripts ===
==== Indo-Aryan ====
Nasalization in Arabic-based scripts of languages such as Urdu, as well as Punjabi and Saraiki, commonly spoken in Pakistan, and by extension India, is indicated by employing the nasal vowel, a dotless form of the Arabic letter nūn (ن) or the letter marked with the maghnūna diacritic: respectively ں, always occurring word finally, or ن٘ in the medial form, called "nūn ghunna". In Sindhi, nasalization is represented with the standard nun letter.

==== Classical Arabic ====
Nasalized vowels occur in Classical Arabic but not in contemporary speech or Modern Standard Arabic. There is no orthographic way to denote the nasalization, but it is systematically taught as part of the essential rules of tajwid, used to read the Qur'an. Nasalization occurs in recitation, usually when a final nūn is followed by a yāʾ (ي).

=== Indic scripts ===
The Brahmic scripts used for most Indic languages mark nasalization with the anusvāra (◌ं), homophonically used for homorganic nasalization in a consonant cluster following the vowel) or the anunāsika (◌ँ) diacritic (and its regional variants).

== Languages ==
The following languages use phonemic nasal vowels:

- Abenaki
- Acehnese
- Assamese
- Balochi
- Basque (Dialectal, only in the Souletin dialect)
- Bavarian
- Belize Kriol
- Bengali (Note: Nasalization is used in Standard Bengali, but absent in Eastern Bengali dialects)
- Breton
- Burmese
- Cape Verdean Creole
- Cayuga
- Central Plains Mandarin
- Cherokee
- Choctaw
- Dutch (dialectal, only in loanwords from French)
- Dutch Low Saxon
- Elfdalian
- Franco-Provençal
- French
- Gbe languages
- Gheg Albanian
- Guaraní
- Gujarati
- Haitian Creole
- Hindustani
- Hmong
- Hokkien
- Jamaican Maroon Creole
- Jamaican Patois
- Japanese
- Jiaoliao Mandarin
- Jilu Mandarin
- Jin Chinese
- Kashubian
- Kelantan-Pattani
- Konkani
- Krio
- Lakota
- Latin
- Lechitic
- Lombard
- Louisiana Creole (Kouri-Vini)
- Mande languages
- Maxakalí
- Mirandese
- Mohawk
- Munda languages
- Navajo
- Ndyuka
- Nepali
- Nheengatu
- Occitan (dialectal)
- Odia
- Old Church Slavonic
- Old Norse
- Oneida
- Onondaga
- Pahang Malay
- Paicî
- Polish
- Portuguese
- Punjabi
- San Andres y Providencia Creole
- Saramaccan
- Scottish Gaelic
- Seneca
- Silesian
- Sranan Tongo
- Taiwanese Hokkien
- Terengganu
- Tuscarora
- Walloon
- Wu
- Xavante
- Xiang Chinese
- Yélî Dnye
- Yoruba

== See also ==
- Nasalization
- Vowel
  - front vowel
  - back vowel

Place →	Labial					Coronal										Dorsal					Laryngeal			
Manner ↓	Bilabial		Labiodental		Linguolabial		Dental		Alveolar		Postalveolar		Retroflex		(Alveolo-)palatal		Velar		Uvular		Pharyngeal/epiglottal		Glottal	
Nasal	m̥	m	ɱ̊	ɱ		n̼	n̪̊	n̪	n̥	n	n̠̊	n̠	ɳ̊	ɳ	ɲ̊	ɲ	ŋ̊	ŋ	ɴ̥	ɴ				
Plosive	p	b	p̪	b̪	t̼	d̼	t̪	d̪	t	d			ʈ	ɖ	c	ɟ	k	ɡ	q	ɢ	ʡ		ʔ	
Sibilant affricate							t̪s̪	d̪z̪	ts	dz	t̠ʃ	d̠ʒ	tʂ	dʐ	tɕ	dʑ								
Non-sibilant affricate	pɸ	bβ	p̪f	b̪v			t̪θ	d̪ð	tɹ̝̊	dɹ̝	t̠ɹ̠̊˔	d̠ɹ̠˔			cç	ɟʝ	kx	ɡɣ	qχ	ɢʁ	ʡʜ	ʡʢ	ʔh	
Sibilant fricative							s̪	z̪	s	z	ʃ	ʒ	ʂ	ʐ	ɕ	ʑ								
Non-sibilant fricative	ɸ	β	f	v	θ̼	ð̼	θ	ð	θ̠	ð̠	ɹ̠̊˔	ɹ̠˔	ɻ̊˔	ɻ˔	ç	ʝ	x	ɣ	χ	ʁ	ħ	ʕ	h	ɦ
Approximant		β̞		ʋ				ð̞		ɹ		ɹ̠		ɻ		j		ɰ						˷
Tap/flap		ⱱ̟		ⱱ					ɾ̥	ɾ			ɽ̊	ɽ						ɢ̆		ʡ̆		
Trill	ʙ̥	ʙ							r̥	r		r̠	ɽ̊r̥	ɽr					ʀ̥	ʀ	ʜ	ʢ		
Lateral affricate									tɬ	dɮ			tꞎ	d𝼅	c𝼆	ɟʎ̝	k𝼄	ɡʟ̝						
Lateral fricative							ɬ̪		ɬ	ɮ			ꞎ	𝼅	𝼆	ʎ̝	𝼄	ʟ̝						
Lateral approximant								l̪	l̥	l		l̠	ɭ̊	ɭ	ʎ̥	ʎ	ʟ̥	ʟ		ʟ̠				
Lateral tap/flap									ɺ̥	ɺ			𝼈̊	𝼈		ʎ̆		ʟ̆						

		BL	LD	D	A	PA	RF	P	V	U
Implosive	Voiced	ɓ			ɗ		ᶑ	ʄ	ɠ	ʛ
Implosive	Voiceless	ɓ̥			ɗ̥		ᶑ̊	ʄ̊	ɠ̊	ʛ̥
Ejective	Stop	pʼ			tʼ		ʈʼ	cʼ	kʼ	qʼ
Ejective	Affricate		p̪fʼ	t̪θʼ	tsʼ	t̠ʃʼ	tʂʼ	tɕʼ	kxʼ	qχʼ
Ejective	Fricative	ɸʼ	fʼ	θʼ	sʼ	ʃʼ	ʂʼ	ɕʼ	xʼ	χʼ
Ejective	Lateral affricate				tɬʼ			c𝼆ʼ	k𝼄ʼ	q𝼄ʼ
Ejective	Lateral fricative				ɬʼ					
Click (top: velar; bottom: uvular)	Tenuis	kʘ qʘ		kǀ qǀ	kǃ qǃ		k𝼊 q𝼊	kǂ qǂ		
Click (top: velar; bottom: uvular)	Voiced	ɡʘ ɢʘ		ɡǀ ɢǀ	ɡǃ ɢǃ		ɡ𝼊 ɢ𝼊	ɡǂ ɢǂ		
Click (top: velar; bottom: uvular)	Nasal	ŋʘ ɴʘ		ŋǀ ɴǀ	ŋǃ ɴǃ		ŋ𝼊 ɴ𝼊	ŋǂ ɴǂ	ʞ	
Click (top: velar; bottom: uvular)	Tenuis lateral				kǁ qǁ					
Click (top: velar; bottom: uvular)	Voiced lateral				ɡǁ ɢǁ					
Click (top: velar; bottom: uvular)	Nasal lateral				ŋǁ ɴǁ					
