= Choapam District =

- District
- Oaxaca regions and districts: Papaloapan to Northeast
- Coordinates: 17°20′N 95°57′W
- Country: Mexico
- State: Oaxaca

Population (2020)
  - Total: 50,365

Choapam District is located in the south of the Papaloapan Region of the State of Oaxaca, Mexico. It covers 2,935 km^{2}, and as of 2020 had a population of 50,365. Its southwestern portion is mountainous, while the northeast is in the coastal plain of the gulf of Mexico.

== Municipalities ==
Choapam district and municipalities

The district includes the following municipalities:

Municipality code	Name	Population		Land Area			Population density	
Municipality code	Name	2020	Rank	km^{2}	sq mi	Rank	2020	Rank
189	San Juan Comaltepec	3,166	6	98.60	38.07	6	32/km^{2} (83/sq mi)	1
205	San Juan Lalana	16,989	1	694.1	268.0	2	24/km^{2} (63/sq mi)	2
212	San Juan Petlapa	3,177	5	188.3	72.7	5	17/km^{2} (44/sq mi)	5
460	Santiago Choapam	5,242	4	311.1	120.1	4	17/km^{2} (44/sq mi)	4
468	Santiago Jocotepec	14,198	2	618.8	238.9	3	23/km^{2} (59/sq mi)	3
498	Santiago Yaveo	7,593	3	1,024	395	1	7/km^{2} (19/sq mi)	6
	Distrito Choapam	50,365	—	2,935	1,133.21	—	17/km^{2} (44/sq mi)	—
Source: INEGI
