= Chinantla =

Cultural and natural region in Oaxaca, Mexico

Chinantla, or La Chinantla, is a culturally defined region in the Mexican state of Oaxaca, inhabited by the Chinantec people. Located in the Sierra Norte de Oaxaca, the region is mountainous and one of the wettest regions in Mexico. It has a high biodiversity, and the Chinantec people are noted for their efforts to protect the environment of the region.

== Name ==
"Chinantla" is derived from the Nahuatl chinamitl ("enclosed space"). The 1572 Relacion de Chinantla applied the name to an occupied town in Oaxaca (now San Juan Bautista Valle Nacional), a nearby abandoned town, the surrounding region that included 28 dependent villages, and a river (now the Rio Valle Nacional) that flowed through that region. The name may have referred to the town and region being surrounded by mountains. Another interpretation is that the name referred to a palisade surrounding a village, and was a generic term for a village.

== Description ==
"Chinantla" refers to a area in Oaxaca inhabited by the Chinantec people. It includes most of the Tuxtepec District, the northern half of Choapam District, the northeast part of Villa Alta District, the northeast part of Ixtlán District, and the eastern part of Cuicatlán District, lying between 17°22' and 18°12' North and 95°43' and 96°38' West, with an area of about 20,000 square kilometres (7,700 sq mi). Botanists in the 19th century, as well as some in the 20th century, used "Chinantla" to refer to a restricted part of that region, including only northwestern Choapam, southernmost Tuxtepec, and northeastern Villa Alta districts in Oaxaca.

The Sierra Madre de Oaxaca, or Sierra Norte de Oaxaca, is part of the Sierra Madre del Sur. The Sierra Norte de Oaxaca runs northwest to southeast, blocking the high-humidity easterlies blowing across Mexico from the Gulf of Mexico. Most of the moisture in the easterlies is forced out by orographic precipitation on the windward (eastern) slopes of the mountains as the air moves over the mountains, bringing the highest rainfall in Mexico to the Chinanlta and creating a hyper-humid climate.

Chinantla includes parts of the Sierra Madre de Oaxaca and is part of the Papaloapan River basin. The region is humid with an annual rainfall between 3,600 and 5,800 millimetres (140 and 230 in). Average annual temperature is 25 °C (77 °F) in the Lowlands and 16 °C (61 °F) in the mountains. Eighty percent of the region has slopes between 6° and 45°. It includes a variety of climatic, geomorphologic, and edaphic conditions, overlaid on a complex geological history. The Sierra Madre de Oaxaca consists of upthrust limestone with igneous intrusions. Elevations above sea level range from 300 feet (91 m) to more than 9,000 feet (2,700 m), with most of the region between 900 and 3,720 feet (270 and 1,130 m)

The Chinantla has been called the "most exotic phytogeographic unit in Mexico". It includes one of the largest areas of tropical rainforest in Mexico. It also includes large areas of montane cloud forest and high-altitude pine–oak forests.

== Chinantec people ==
The Chinantecs have inhabited Chinantla since pre-Columbian times. They speak the Chinantecan languages, which belong to the Oto-Manguean family.

Chinantecs still use the milpa system of agriculture. The land is communally owned, but fields are assigned to families to cultivate. Maize and beans are the primary crops. Plants such as cucurbits and chayote are grown in the vicinity of dwellings, but other crops, primarily greens, are grown in the fields between the corn rows. The Chinantec have maintained their pre-Columbian tradition of sabio-curanderos ("herb doctors").

Despite the high biodiversity of the Chinantla region and the presence of many threatened species, there are no government protected areas in the region. The Chintantec people have created 27 "Areas Destined Voluntarily for Conservation" (ADVC) which are certified by the Mexican National Commission of Protected Natural Areas. There are four "Voluntary Conservation Areas" (VCA) which have not been certified by the Mexican government. The ADVC and the CVA are managed by the Chinantec people, with rules governing use of the areas established by local consensus.

== History ==
According to local accounts, in approximately 1100 CE, a king named Quiana founded a large kingdom in Chinantla. This kingdom was later divided into highland and lowland sections due to internal conflicts, with the highland division centered in San Pedro Yólox. Around 1400, the highland section was further divided, and part of the population migrated to San Felipe Usila.

Around 1464, Chinantec invaders from Chiltepec Viejo conquered part of what is now the Choapam District and established a new kingdom that included the towns of San Juan Petlapa, Asunción Lacova, and San Juan Lalana, displacing the Zapotecs and Mixes who had been living there. This kingdom was referred to as Coatlicamac by the Aztecs, which was later hispanized to Guatinicamanes.

Around 1455, the Aztec Empire established a garrison and administrative center at Tuxtepec in what is now northern Oaxaca. A preserved Aztec manuscript mentions a military campaign by the Aztecs against Chinantla in 1479. The Aztec ruler Ahuitzotl conquered the Chinantecs in 1488. The Chinantecs joined Hernán Cortés in attacking the Aztec Empire in 1519. They were noted for the unusually long lances they fought with. However, this alliance did not last, and around 1530, the Chinantecs of Usila rebelled against the Spanish.

Because of its proximity to Veracruz and its fertility, the Chinantla was one of the most important areas of New Spain in terms of agriculture, with crops like coffee, banana, and tobacco being introduced. However, the Chinantec language was considered very hard for Spanish missionaries to learn due to its tones, hindering the evangelization of the Chinantec people.

During the Porfiriato, the local non-indigenous elite allied itself with the dictatorship, which resulted in some non-indigenous towns receiving services but the indigenous population being marginalized. By 1910, the liberal reform had produced haciendas devoted to the cultivation of tobacco, cocoa and coffee, and many foreigners had come to San Juan Bautista Valle Nacional to buy land. Plantations effectively became forced labor camps for rebels and political opponents of the regime. The marginalization of the indigenous population would only intensify in the 1920s and 1930s as the United Fruit Company and Standard Fruit Company established a strong presence in the region until land reform forced them to withdraw in 1941. However, the region continued to experience commercialization. From 1940 to 1970, the Chinantla Baja was affected by several developmental projects, such as the Miguel Alemán Dam and Cerro de Oro Dam, which resulted in hundreds of Chinantec families being relocated to the nearby sections of the state of Veracruz.

== Flora ==
The Chinantla region in the sense used by 19th-century botanists includes northwestern Choapam, southernmost Tuxtepec, and northeastern Villa Alta districts in northern Oaxaca, almost all of which is tropical rainforest, the northernmost reach of the Central American rainforest. Botanists from Europe started exploring the region in 1839, collecting thousands of specimens. The region was rich in rare plants, and while some plants found in Chinantla have become important in horticulture, many of them have never been found again. Some of the plants are endemic to the region, while others have since been found to be widespread.

Tropical Central American rainforest mingles with the Arcto-Tertiary Geoflora in Chinantla. Altitude and microclimate weakly divide the flora into various zones. Tropical rainforest is found up to an elevation of 1,300 metres (4,300 ft). The zone from 1,300 to 2,500 metres (4,300 to 8,200 ft) typically consists of cloud forest, with pine-oak or temperate montane hardwood canopy and tropical understory. Lowland tropical species also are found in the tropical montane zone. Pine-oak forests are found above 2,500 metres (8,200 ft) elevation. The eastern part of Cuicatlán District has been called "Chinantla cuicateca". The forest in Chinantla cuicateca is higher and cooler, close to the temperate montane zone. Most of the plant species in Chinantla are endigenous to Mexico, and related to tropical species. Many trees, however, are closely related to species of the temperate zone, including trees from both the eastern and western United States.

Chinantla is noted for its large number of endemic plant species. The municipio of San Pedro Sochiapam in the Cuicatlán District is home to more than 2,000 species of vascular plants, of which more than 1,000 have been named by the people of the municipio. A study published in 2017 centered on San Felipe Usila in the Tuxtepec District, with additional material from San Juan Bautista Valle Nacional, also in Tuxtepec District, and Santiago Comaltepec in Ixtlan District. The study reported 1,021 species of plants in 471 genera and 162 families. Based on known problems in the collection of plants and an estimate of undercounting, the authors estimate there are 1,647 species of plants in Chinantla.

== Fauna ==
A study published in 2023 found 134 species of mammals in La Chinantla, including 52 species of bats and 38 species of rodents. The high mountain pine-oak forest had the highest number of mammal species, 88, while the lowland tropical rainforest had 85 species. Of those species, the International Union for the Conservation of Nature (ICUN) has listed the lesser long-nosed bat (Leptonycteris yerbabuenae), spectral bat (Vampyrum spectrum), margay (Leopardus wiedii), jaguar (Panthera onca), and neotropical otter (Lontra longicaudis) as near threatened, the big Mexican small-eared shrew (Cryptotis magnus), large-toothed shrew (Sorex macrodon), Thomas's sac-winged bat (Balantiopterix io), tricolored bat (Perimyotis subflavus), and Chapman's rice rat (Handleyomys chapmani) as vulnerable, the Geoffroy's spider monkey (Ateles geoffroyi), Central American tapeti (Sylvilagus gabbi), Oaxaca giant deer mouse (Megadontomys cryophilis), tarabundi vole (Microtus oaxacensis), black-wristed deer mouse (Peromyscus melanocarpus), and Baird's tapir (Tapirus bairdii) as endangered, and the Mexican agouti (Dasyprocta mexicana), Chinanteco deer mouse (Habromys chinanteco), Ixtlan deer mouse (Habromys ixtlani), and Zempoaltepec deer mouse (Habromys lepturus) as critically endangered. The Convention on International Trade in Endangered Species of Wild Fauna and Flora (CITES) has listed the jaguarundi (Puma yagouaroundi), ocelot (Leopardis pardalis), margay, neotropical otter, and Baird's tapir under Appendix I (threatened with extinction), and jaguarundi (Herpailurus concolor) and jaguar under Appendix II (trade must be controlled).

The diversity of mammal species in Chinantla is among the highest in Mexico due to the diversity of ecosystems in the region, the inaccessibility of parts of the region, and the locally managed conservation areas.

== Sources ==
- Briones-Salas, Miguel; Galindo-Aguilar, Rosa E.; González, Graciela E.; Luna-Krauletz, María Delfina (7 November 2023). "Diversity and conservation of mammals in indigenous territories of southern Mexico: proposal for an "Archipelago Reserve"". PeerJ. 11 e16345. doi:10.7717/peerj.16345. ISSN 2167-8359. PMC 10637252. PMID 37953770.
- Brinton, Daniel G. (1892). "Observations on the Chinantec Language of Mexico". Proceedings of the American Philosophical Society. 30 (137): 22–31. ISSN 0003-049X. JSTOR 983206.
- Cline, Howard F. (1957). "Problems of Mexican Ethno-History: The Ancient Chinantla, A Case Study". The Hispanic American Historical Review. 37 (3): 273–295. doi:10.2307/2510399. ISSN 0018-2168. JSTOR 2510399.
- Lipp, Frank J. (1971). "Ethnobotany of the Chinantec Indians, Oaxaca, Mexico". Economic Botany. 25 (3): 234–244. Bibcode:1971EcBot..25..234L. doi:10.1007/BF02860760. ISSN 0013-0001. JSTOR 4253259.
- Meave, Jorge A.; Rincón-Gutiérrez, Armando; Ibarra-Manríquez, Guillermo; Gallardo-Hernández, Claudia; Romero-Romero, Marco Antonio; Meave, Jorge A.; Rincón-Gutiérrez, Armando; Ibarra-Manríquez, Guillermo; Gallardo-Hernández, Claudia; Romero-Romero, Marco Antonio (December 2017). "Checklist of the vascular flora of a portion of the hyper-humid region of La Chinantla, Northern Oaxaca Range, Mexico". Botanical Sciences. 95 (4): 722–759. Bibcode:2017BotSc..95..722M. doi:10.17129/botsci.1812. ISSN 2007-4298.
- Schultes, Richard Evans (1941). "The Meaning and Usage of the Mexican Place-Name "Chinantla"". Botanical Museum Leaflets, Harvard University. 9 (6): 101–116. doi:10.5962/p.295155. ISSN 0006-8098. JSTOR 41762040.
- Gallardo Vásquez, César Julio (2024). Ja mejy jïts ja kojpk: Atlas de la conquista de la región mixe-zoque.
- Wauchope, Robert; Wiley, Gordon; Spores, Ronald (1965). Handbook of Middle American Indians, Volumes 2 and 3: Archaeology of Southern Mesoamerica. University of Texas Press. ISBN 9781477306550.
- "Chinantecos - Etnografía - Atlas de los Pueblos Indígenas de México. INPI". Atlas de los Pueblos Indígenas de México. INPI (in Mexican Spanish). 2020. Archived from the original on 2026-03-09.
