= Languages of Mexico =

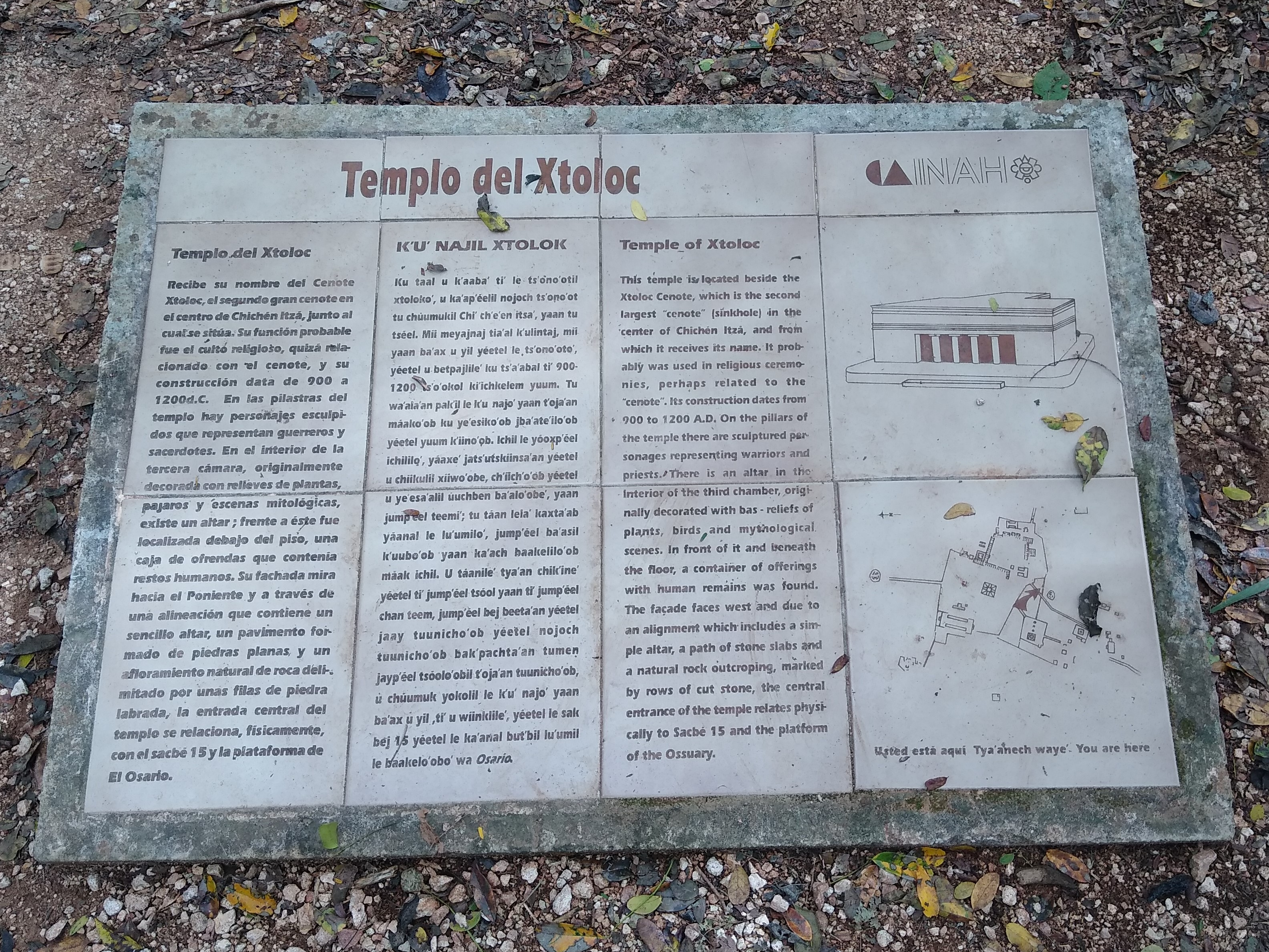
- A sign at Chichén Itzá in Spanish, Yucatec Maya and English
- Official: Spanish and 68 Indigenous Languages
- National: Spanish
- Indigenous: Nahuatl, Yucatec Maya, Zapotec, Mixtec, Mayo, Yaqui, Tzeltal, Tzotzil, Chol, Totonac, Purépecha, Otomi, Mazahua, Mazatec, Chinantec, Mixe, Zoque, Popoluca, Popoloca language, Me'phaa, Wixarika, Chontal, Huave, Pame, Teenek, Kickapoo, Kiliwa, Paipai, Cucapá, Amuzgo, Triqui, Lacandon Maya, Mam Maya, Jakaltek, Matlatzinca, Tepehua, Chichimeca Jonaz, Pima Bajo, Ngiwa, Ixcatec, Ayapanec, Huasteco, etc.
- Vernacular: Mexican Spanish
- Minority: Plautdietsch, Chipilo Venetian dialect, Afro-Seminole Creole
- Foreign: English, German, Greek, Italian, Arabic, French, Portuguese, Chinese, Japanese, Russian
- Signed: Mexican Sign Language, Mayan Sign Language, American Sign Language, and local village sign languages
- Keyboard layout: QWERTY

The Constitution of Mexico does not declare an official language; however, Spanish is the de facto national and administrative language spoken by over 90% of the population, while English is also spoken by 5%. This makes Mexico the largest Spanish speaking country in the world. Due to the cultural influence of the United States, American English is widely understood, especially in border states and tourist regions, with a hybridization of Spanglish spoken. The government recognizes 63 indigenous languages spoken in their communities out of respect, including Nahuatl, Mayan, Mixtec, etc.

The Mexican government uses solely Spanish for official and legislative purposes, but it has yet to declare it the national language mostly out of respect to the indigenous communities that still exist. Most indigenous languages are endangered, with some languages expected to become extinct within years or decades, and others simply having populations that grow slower than the national average. According to the Commission for the Development of Indigenous Peoples (CDI) and National Institute of Indigenous Languages (INALI), while 9% of the population identifies as belonging to an indigenous group, around 5–6% speak an indigenous language.

== Language history ==
From the arrival of the first Franciscan missionaries, Spanish, Latin, and indigenous languages played parts in the evangelization of Mexico. Many 16th-century churchmen studied indigenous languages in order to instruct native peoples in Christian doctrine. The same men also found Castilian and Latin appropriate in certain contexts. All told, there existed a kind of "linguistic coexistence" from the beginning of the colonial period.

Some monks and priests attempted to describe and classify indigenous languages with Spanish. In 1570, Philip II of Spain made Nahuatl an official language of the colonies of New Spain to facilitate communication between the natives of the colonies.

In 1696, the government of Charles II reversed that policy and banned the use of any languages other than Spanish throughout New Spain. Beginning in the 18th century, decrees ordering the Hispanization of indigenous populations became more numerous and Spanish colonizers no longer learned the indigenous languages.

After independence the government initiated an educational system with the primary aim of Hispanization of the native populations. This policy was based on the idea that this would help the indigenous peoples become a more integrated part of the new Mexican nation.

Except for the Second Mexican Empire, led by the Habsburg Maximilian I, no Mexican government tried to prevent the loss of indigenous languages during the 19th century.

The 1895 census records some 16% of the populace spoke various indigenous languages "habitually," while 0.17% spoke foreign languages. The rest, 83.71%, spoke primarily Spanish.

For most of the 20th century successive governments denied native tongues the status of valid languages. Indigenous students were forbidden to speak their native languages in school and were often punished for doing so.

In 2002, Mexico's constitution was amended to reinforce Mexico's pluricultural nature, by giving the State the obligation to protect and nurture the expressions of this diversity. In June 1999, the Council of Writers in Indigenous Languages presented Congress with a document entitled "Suggested legal initiatives towards linguistic rights of indigenous peoples and communities", with the goal of beginning to protect the linguistic rights of indigenous communities. La Ley General de Derechos Lingüísticos de los Pueblos Indígenas was passed in March 2003, establishing a framework for the conservation, nurturing and development of indigenous languages. Critics claim that the law's complexity makes enforcement difficult.

== Indigenous languages ==
Spanish is the de facto national language spoken by the vast majority of Mexicans, though it is not defined as an official language in legislation. The second article of the 1917 Constitution defines the country as multicultural, recognizes the right of the indigenous peoples to "preserve and enrich their languages" and promotes "bilingual and intercultural education".

In 2003, the Mexican Congress approved the General Law of Linguistic Rights of the Indigenous Peoples (Spanish: Ley General de Derechos Lingüísticos), which is a law that recognizes that Mexico's history makes its indigenous languages "national languages". They "have the same validity [as Spanish] in their territory, location and context". At the same time, legislators made no specific provisions for the official or legal status of the Spanish language. This law means that indigenous peoples can use their native language in communicating with government officials and request official documents in that language. The Mexican state supports the preservation and promotion of the use of the national languages through the activities of the National Institute of Indigenous Languages.

Mexico has about six million citizens who speak indigenous languages. That is the second-largest group in the Americas after Peru. However, a relatively small percentage of Mexico's population speaks an indigenous language compared to other countries in the Americas, such as Guatemala (42.8%), Peru (35%), and even Ecuador (9.4%), Panama (8.3%), Paraguay and Bolivia.

The only indigenous language spoken by more than a million people in Mexico is the Nahuatl language. The other Native American languages with a large population of native speakers, at least 400,000 speakers, include Yucatec Maya, Tzeltal Maya, Tzotzil Maya, Mixtec, and Zapotec.

== Language endangerment ==
Indigenous languages of Mexico
Language	Speakers
Nahuatl (Nahuatl, Nahuat, Nahual, Macehualtlahtol, Melatahtol)	1,651,958
Yucatec Maya (Maaya t'aan)	774,755
Tzeltal Maya (K'op o winik atel)	589,144
Tzotzil Maya (Batsil k'op)	550,274
Mixtec (Tu'un sávi)	526,593
Zapotec (Diidxaza)	490,845
Otomí (Hñä hñü)	298,861
Totonac (Tachihuiin)	256,344
Ch'ol (Mayan) (Winik)	254,715
Mazatec (Ha shuta enima)	237,212
Huastec (Téenek)	168,729
Mazahua (Jñatho)	153,797
Tlapanec (Me'phaa)	147,432
Chinantec (Tsa jujmí)	144,394
Purépecha (P'urhépecha)	142,459
Mixe (Ayüük)	139,760
Tarahumara (Rarámuri)	91,554
Zoque	74,018
Tojolab'al (Tojolwinik otik)	66,953
Chontal de Tabasco (Yokot t'an)	60,563
Huichol (Wixárika)	60,263
Amuzgo (Tzañcue)	59,884
Chatino (Cha'cña)	52,076
Tepehuano del sur (Ódami)	44,386
Mayo (Yoreme)	38,507
Popoluca (Zoquean) (Tuncápxe)	36,113
Cora (Naáyarite)	33,226
Trique (Tinujéi)	29,545
Yaqui (Yoem Noki or Hiak Nokpo)	19,376
Huave (Ikoods)	18,827
Popoloca (Oto-manguean)	17,274
Cuicatec (Nduudu yu)	12,961
Pame (Xigüe)	11,924
Mam (Qyool)	11,369
Q'anjob'al	10,851
Tepehuano del norte	9,855
Tepehua (Hamasipini)	8,884
Chontal de Oaxaca (Slijuala sihanuk)	5,613
Sayultec	4,765
Chuj	3,516
Acateco	2,894
Chichimeca jonaz (Úza)	2,364
Ocuilteco (Tlahuica)	2,238
Guarijío (Warihó)	2,139
Q'eqchí (Q'eqchí)	1,599
Matlatzinca	1,245
Pima Bajo (Oob No'ok)	1,037
Chocho (Runixa ngiigua)	847
Lacandón (Hach t'an)	771
Seri (Cmiique iitom)	723
Kʼicheʼ	589
Kumiai (Ti'pai)	495
Jakaltek (Poptí) (Abxubal)	481
Texistepequeño	368
Paipai (Jaspuy pai)	231
Pápago (O'odham)	203
Ixcatec	195
Kaqchikel	169
Cucapá (Kuapá)	176
Motozintleco or Qato’k	126
Lipan Apache (Ndé miizaa)	120
Ixil	117
Oluteco	77
Kiliwa language (Ko'lew)	76
Kikapú (Kikapoa)	63
Aguacatec	20
Other languages^{1}	150,398
^{1} mostly insufficiently specified languages
Only includes population 5 and older. Source: INEGI (2005)

According to the Law of Linguistic Rights, Mexico recognizes sixty-two indigenous languages as co-official National languages. With Spanish being the dominant language, Mexico has become a site for endangered languages. "Indigenous people’s disadvantaged socioeconomic status and the pressure of assimilation into mestizo society have been influential on indigenous language loss."

The result of the conflict between indigenous languages and Spanish has been a language shift in Mexico from indigenous languages being spoken to more people using Spanish in every domain. Due to this situation there have been many language revitalization strategies implemented in order to create a language shift to try to reverse this language shift. Literature projects done with the Nahua people include "Keeping the fire alive: a decade of language revitalization in Mexico" showing the experiences of language revitalization in South Mexico.

=== Classification ===
The following is a classification of the 65 indigenous languages grouped by family:

Language families with members north of Mexico

- Algonquian languages: Kikapú
- Yuman–Cochimí languages: Paipai, Kiliwa, Cucapá, Cochimi and Kumiai
- Uto-Aztecan languages:
  - Tepiman branch: Pápago, Pima Bajo, Northern and Southern Tepehuán
  - Taracahita branch: Tarahumara, Guarijio language, Yaqui and Mayo
  - Corachol branch: Cora and Huichol
  - Nahuan branch: Nahuatl, Nahuan dialects
- Na-Dene languages: Lipan, Mescalero, Chiricahua, Western Apache

Language families with all known members in Mexico

- Totonacan languages:
  - Totonac (different varieties)
  - Tepehua (different varieties)
- Oto-Manguean languages:
  - Oto-pamean branch: Northern Pame, Southern Pame, Chichimeca Jonaz, Otomí, Mazahua, Matlatzinca and Ocuiltec.
  - Popolocan branch: Popoloca language, Chocho, Ixcatec language*, Mazatecan languages
  - Tlapanec–Subtiaban branch: Me'phaa
  - Amuzgoan branch: Amuzgo de Guerrero, Amuzgo de Oaxaca
  - Mixtecan branch: Mixtecan languages, Cuicatec and Trique language.
  - Zapotecan branch: Chatino languages, Zapotec languages.
  - Chinantec branch: Chinantec languages
  - Chiapaneca–Mangue branch: Chiapaneco*
- Mixe–Zoquean languages:
  - Zoque languages
  - Mixe languages
  - Popoluca (Texistepec Popoluca, Sierra Popoluca (Both Zoquean) and Sayula Popoluca Oluta Popoluca (Both Mixean))

Language family with members south of Mexico

- Mayan languages:
  - Huastecan branch: Wastek language,
  - Yucatecan branch: Yukatek Maya, Lacandón,
  - Cholan branch: Ch'ol language, Chontal Maya language, Tzeltal language, Tzotzil language,
  - Qanjobalan–Chujean branch: Chuj language, Tojolabal language, Q'anjob'al language, Jakaltek, Motozintlec, Akatek language
  - Quichean–Mamean branch: Mam language, Tektitek language, Ixil, Kʼicheʼ language, Kaqchikel and Q'eqchi'.

Language isolates:

- Seri
- Tequistlatecan languages: Lowland Chontal, Highland Chontal
- Purépecha
- Huave

*In danger of extinction.

== Other languages ==
The deaf community uses Mexican Sign Language, Mayan Sign Language, and, particularly among Mexicans who attended school in the United States, American Sign Language. Other local sign languages are used or emerging, including Albarradas Sign Language, Chatino Sign Language, Tzotzil Sign Language, and Tijuana Sign Language.

The non-Spanish and non-indigenous languages spoken in Mexico include English, by speaking English, as well as by the residents of border states. One example of this group is of the American Mormon colonies of Nuevo Casas Grandes in Chihuahua, which settled in the late 19th century. Afro-Seminole Creole, an English-based creole, is traditionally spoken by the Mascogos of Coahuila. Korean is spoken mainly in Nuevo León.

German (spoken mainly in Mexico City and Puebla), Greek (spoken mainly in Mexico City, Guadalajara and especially in Sinaloa state), Arabic, Venetian (in Chipilo), Italian, French, Dutch, Occitan, Catalan, Basque, Galician, Asturian, Filipino, Polish, Hebrew, Yiddish, Korean, Ladino, Plautdietsch, Armenian, Japanese, Chinese and other languages are spoken by smaller numbers.

Venetian and Plautdietsch are spoken in isolated communities or villages. The rest are spoken by immigrants or their descendants who tend to live in the larger cities and towns.

As far as second languages go, many educated Mexicans, and those with little education who have immigrated to the US and returned, have different degrees of fluency in English. Many Mexicans working in the tourist industry can speak some English.

A 2019 study by the Alliance française revealed that Mexicans have begun to take a greater interest in studying the French language, with 250,000 people being French speakers and 350,000 learning French.

Romani is spoken by the Mexican Roma minority.

== Gallery ==
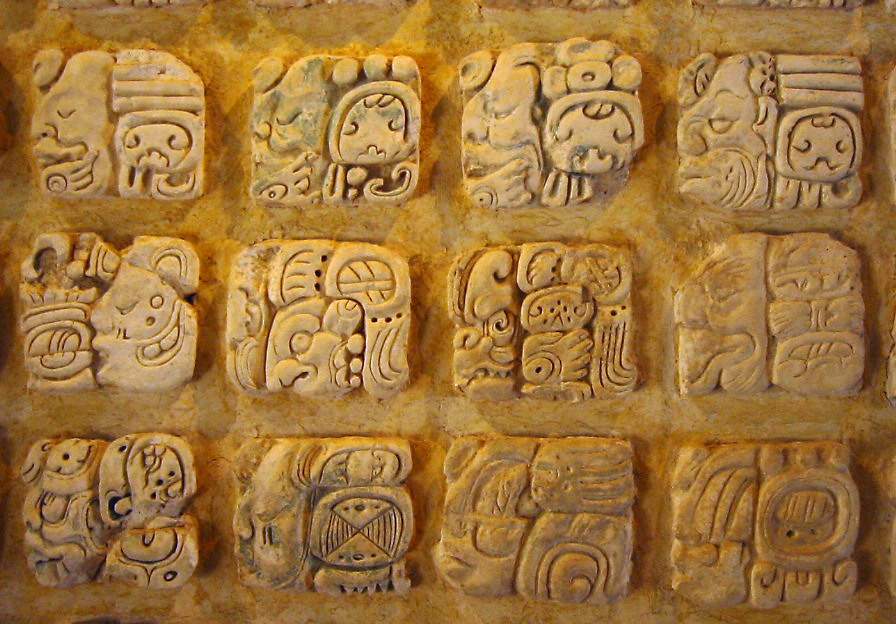
Mexico is home to some of the world's oldest writing systems (Epi-Olmec, Zapotec, Maya script). Maya writing used logograms complemented by syllabic glyphs, similar in function to modern Japanese writing

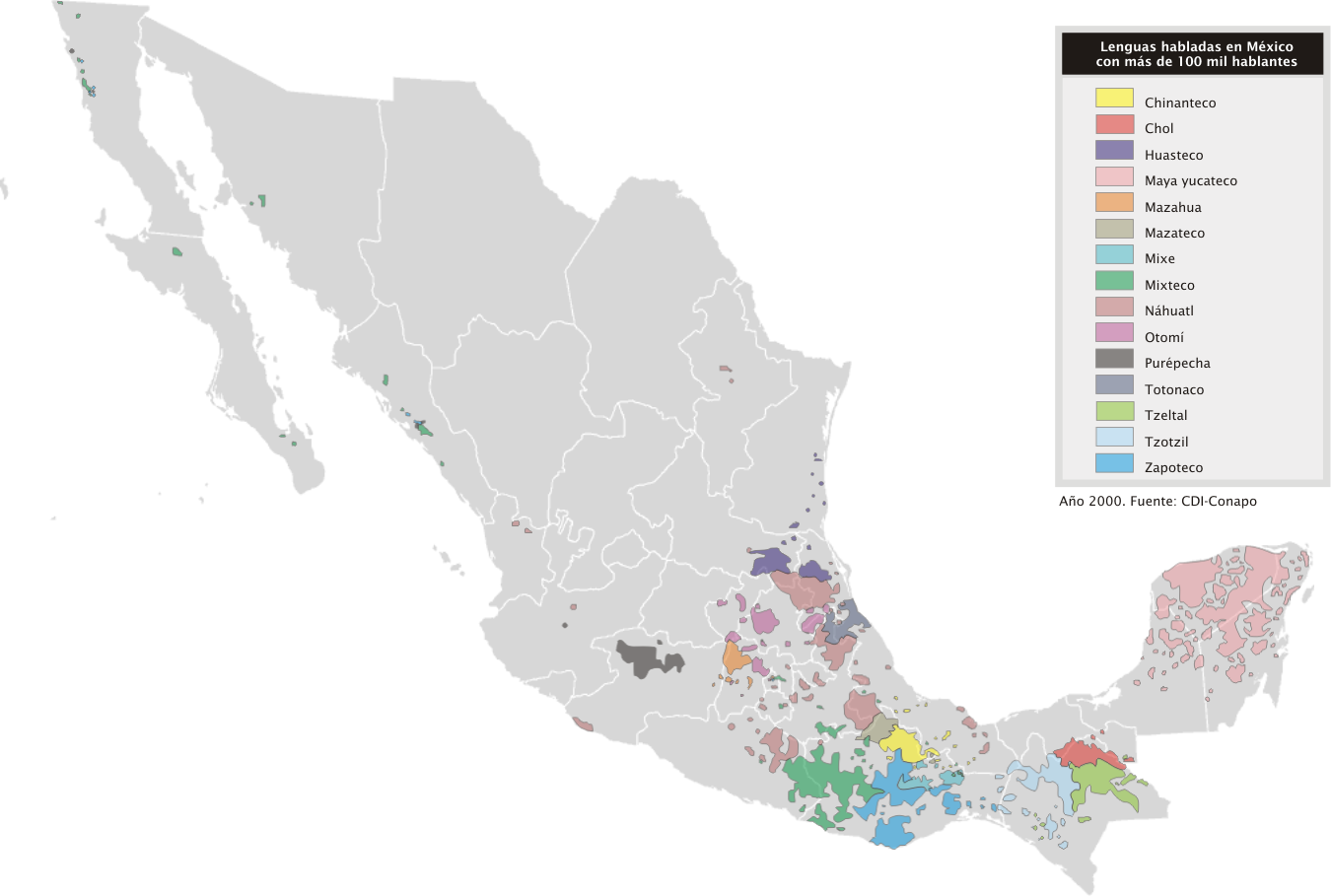
The current distribution of indigenous languages of Mexico with more than 100,000 speakers

The approximate pre-contact distribution of native language families, with their presence in present-day Mexico and elsewhere

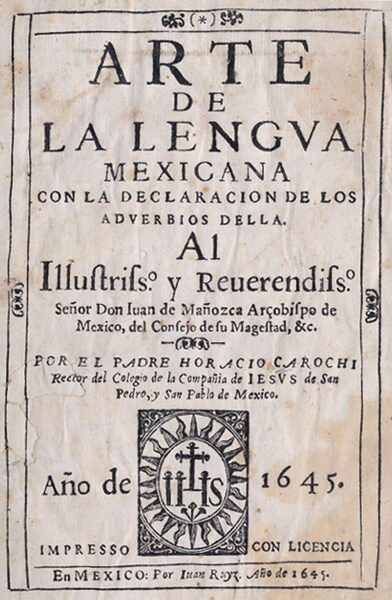
Arte de la lengua mexicana by Jesuit priest and grammarian Horacio Carochi

Dialect division of Spanish in Mexico, according to Lope Blanch.

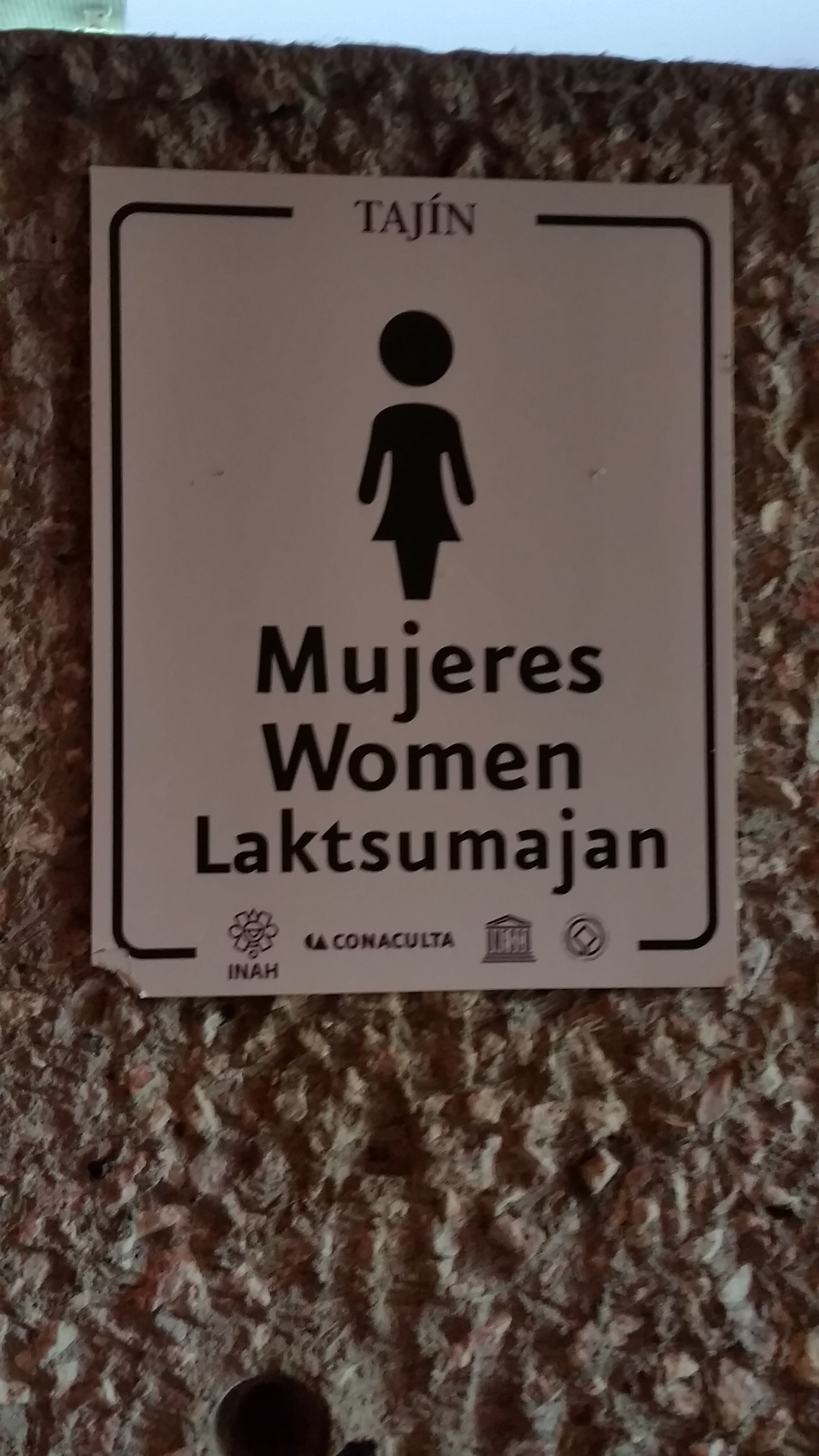
Toilet sign in Mexico in Spanish, English and Totonac

== See also ==
- List of Mexican states by indigenous-speaking population
- Pura López Colomé
- Languages of Belize
- Languages of Guatemala
- Languages of the United States
