= Chimalapa =

Chimalapa may refer to:

== Biology ==
- Exerodonta chimalapa

== Geography ==
- San Miguel Chimalapa, Oaxaca
- Santa María Chimalapa, Oaxaca
- Chimalapas montane forests in the Sierra Chimalapa of Oaxaca

== Languages ==
- Chimalapa Zoque

== Others ==
- Chimalapas territory conflict
