= Chimalapas territory conflict =

Territorial conflict in Mexico

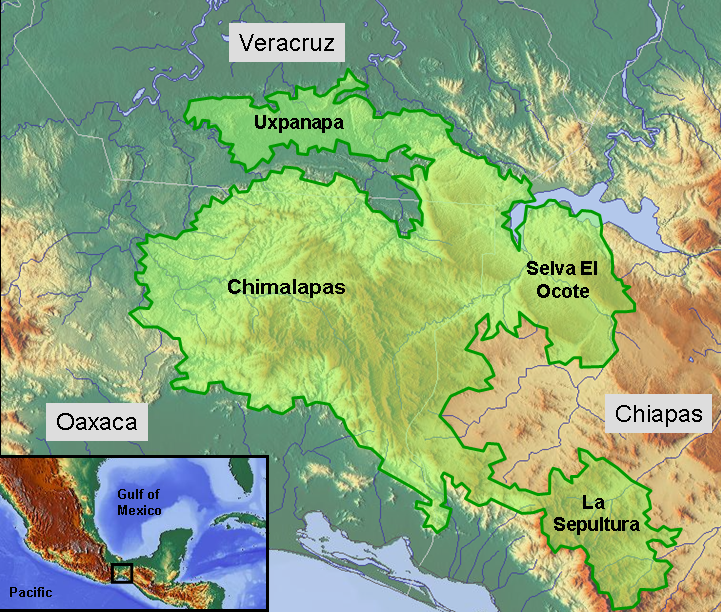
The Chimalapas area

For more than 500 years, the indigenous Zoque people of Chimalapas in Southern Mexico have been victim of invasions in their territory. Chimalapas is a region with a large biodiversity and due to that it is of interest to, among others, the federal government, state governments, and a variety of companies. Therefore, throughout history several claims have been laid on this area. This goes against the will of the Zoque people, who want to take care of this land as they have done ever since they started living in this area.

== Area ==
Chimalapas is primarily located in southeastern Oaxaca and partially in western Chiapas. It is one of the bioregions of top importance in all of Mesoamerica. A variety of ecosystems exists in this area, including rainforests, cloud forests, and pine forests. Chimalapas is also inhabited by a large variety of animal and plant species. Although Chimalapas has a great biodiversity, is not a wildlife reserve or a protected space. The Mexican government has repeatedly tried to classify it that way, but due to the adamant refusal of indigenous communities in the area this has not succeeded. The health, existence, and high quality of conservation of the ecosystems of the Chimalapas area are seen as a direct result of the deliberate care of the indigenous communities living in the area. It is estimated that a single hectare in the region can host up to 900 plant species and over 200 animal species. It houses 149 species of mammals.

== Inhabitants ==
The original inhabitants of the area are the Zoque people. They are descendants of the Olmeca people, who have lived in Chimalapas for more than 2,500 years. Though the Zoque people are the official land owners, there are currently many different groups of people living within Chimalapas. These ethnic groups include the Chinantecos, Mixtecos, Zapotecos, Tzotziles, Tzeltales, and the Zoque Olmecas.

== History ==
Before the Spanish arrived in Mexico, the Zoque people of Chimalapas, Tabasco, and Chiapas, with the Mixes and Popolucas, were a peaceful people who were trading extensively with each other. By 1300, the Zapotecs, coming from the Central Valleys of Oaxaca, separated the Mixes and the Zoques when they conquered parts of the land. Later on, in 1447, the Mexica, as they passed through the Isthmus towards Chiapas, and Guatemala, cut the alliance between the Popolucas and the Mixes, and they defeated the Zoque people of Tabasco, and Chiapas, after which they forced them to pay tribute. Since then, the Mexica, allied with the Zapotecs, conquered and plundered various towns of the Zoque, which affected the trade seriously.

When eventually the Spanish arrived in Mexico they initially did not enter the Chimalapas, since the dense jungle was no easy terrain. However, in 1647 Burgoa Fran Francis tells of the Chimalapas land and its peoples and quickly this land came under the rule of the Spanish. Then on March 24, 1687, the priest Domingo Pintado paid twenty-five thousand pesos in gold to the Crown of Spain for the lands of Santa María (the Chimalapas were then one community), which existed of 900.000 hectares. Then he resold this back to the Zoque people, arguing that by not getting robbed of their land they had to pay gourds filled with gold. That is also where the name Chimalapas comes from; it means “golden gourd”.

In 1842, large areas of the Isthmus of Tehuantepec were devoted to build an interoceanic railway. Because of this project the Zoques of the Chimalapas asked the president Jose Joaquin Herrera in 1850 for the ratification of the colonial title, which was granted. From then until the 20th century, the Zoque of the Chimalapas remained in their forests and jungles as the only people present, with relatively little direct attacks. However, in the meantime estates got created on paper, and further studies were done to open different interoceanic routes through the area. Furthermore, forests were being cleared on the borders of the Chimalapas area.

With the agrarian revolution of 1910–1915 and the consequent change in legislation, the Zoque were again forced to seek recognition of their lands, which became invaded by farms in the north and west. At that time, the Zoque made a big mistake by agreeing with having no private ownership of the land, but that they only used the land, and will not populate or colonize the jungle. They remained in the central and western part of the territory and saw the eastern part as a collection area, hunting and nature reserve. Due to this error, landowners, loggers and ranchers, especially from Chiapas, came to gain profit from this land.

Between 1911 and 1920 the first group of Zapotec migrants came to the area, fleeing revolutionary violence. This was the start of the formation of the multi-ethnic population that currently exists in the Chimalapas. Furthermore, from 1980 to 1989, the entire eastern part of the Chimalapas became violently colonized by indigenous Tzeltal and Tzotzil people from Chiapas, which made the territorial issue even more complex.

Since 1947, five large timber companies, with the full support of the government of Chiapas, started clearing the forest from the east. This was done under the pretext that these lands were in Chiapas territory and were not of anyone (since the error made earlier). Therefore, this part of Chimalapas was declared as public lands belonging to Chiapas. The clearing operation ceased in 1977, when the laborers and workers of the companies went on strike, since they were not allowed to plant their own fields. Then they joined forces with the Zoque villagers in the area who were fighting for their land, and together they started driving out loggers and farmers. The laborers and workers who joined the villagers in this struggle then asked for admission to the community and for the foundation of five communal congregations in the east of the Chimalapas.

The official recognition of the Zoque territory of the Chimalapas was achieved only in 1967, when President Gustavo Díaz Ordaz divided the original community into Santa María and San Miguel, which together formed about 594.000 ha. With this the Chimalapas area of the Zoque suffered a loss of 300.000 ha that had been indicated to be theirs in the original titles. Also, although the communities now had Presidential Resolution, this was not physically carried out until 1992.

In order to stop the conflicts the Zoque communities of the Chimalapas determined in 1991 that most ejidatarios of Chiapas are as indigenous and poor as them and that they were both victim of deception and manipulation by the government. Therefore, they decided to start a program, without government intervention, aiming at signing agreements with the indigenous peasants of Chiapas, on the following basis:

1. The conflict between states should be forgotten, because all are farmers and Mexicans.
2. There should be mutual respect and absolute possession of the true land by the peasants who live in Chimalapas.
3. There should be no provocation and aggression among commoners and landowners, but peace among the peasants.
4. It is not allowed to create new settlements in the region.
5. There should be mutual support to defend and protect the mountain (especially in preventing and combating forest fires).

During that time government of Chiapas was accused of threatening to stop this program and of forcing to withdraw the agreements that had been signed. From that time on violence increased in the Chimalapas area.

Because nothing had changed in the meantime, in 1993, 110 indigenous people from Chimalapas moved to Mexico City where they made an international complaint. This resulted in the signing of an Act of Agreements at the end of the year between the communities, the National Committee for the Defence of Chimalapas, the Federal Government, and the governments of Oaxaca and Chiapas, in which they point to the following governmental commitments:

1. A definitive solution to the agricultural conflict, evicting invasive private farmers and giving a different treatment to the ejidos of Chiapas, incorporating their land into communal possession.
2. An end to the violation of indigenous human rights.
3. Respect for the community process to establish their own Campesino Ecological Reserve.

These agreements were only partially fulfilled in the following years. Instead, since 1998, the new interim governor of Chiapas, Roberto Albores Guillén, restarted a policy of "defense of the state of Chiapas", resulting in continued practices of logging and building of settlements.

At the same time when these problems continued occurring in the east, there were also problems in the west. The major threats to the forest are national development projects, illegal logging and ranching. The Community of Santa María and the colony Cuauhtémoc have had a longlasting conflict. This conflict was born in 1957 with the creation of this colony in the historically communal territory. This territory was still not legally recognized by the new governments at that time. While the people of the Chimalapas did not get the demarcation of their communal lands throughout the following years, the colony was claiming more and more land of Chimalapas until they had claimed up to 12.850 ha in 2003. This conflict exploded violently in April 1998 when 22 settlers who were cutting down trees of the jungle were stopped by an indigenous committee and taken to prison in Santa María. This resulted in 900 policemen besieging Santa Maria, taking seven people to jail. After this violent situation, the government of Oaxaca and la Secretaría de la Reforma Agraria (SRA) promised to the community a “prompt” solution, which once again became trapped in bureaucratic and legal procedures, meetings, and so on. Then, in May of that year, the Community Assembly of Santa Maria decided to delimit its boundaries with Cuauhtémoc on the ground “with the government or without it”, which again put up the risk of violence.

== Recent developments ==
In the meantime, nothing much has changed. The agrarian problem, together with the interstate border conflict between Oaxaca and Chiapas has made the situation very complex. The Oaxacan governor Gabino Cué has met the presidents of the communal land of Santa María and San Miguel Chimalapa, iterating that he wanted to find ways to resolve the problems they have with the states of Veracruz and Chiapas. However, in the meantime still nothing has changed and invasions keep taking place. Again the villagers have been taking the right in their own hands by blocking roads to Chiapanec settlements in the east.

Around the same time the governor of Chiapas, Juan Sabines Guerrero, publicly announced the creation of a new municipality in Chimalapas: Belisario Domínguez, which is now the basis of one of the most intense conflicts in the area.

In the west the issues concerning Cuauhtémoc continue. On February 25, 2004 the President of Mexico, Vicente Fox, gave formal recognition of the possession of the 12.850 acres, that Cuauhtémoc had taken before, to the community of Santa María Chimalapa. Thereby the families of Cuauhtémoc were compensated with 120 million pesos. However, until 2010, the lands have not been given to Santa María physically. There has not been made a physical demarcation of the land since.

On March 8, 2012 it was announced that the governors of Oaxaca and Chiapas reached an agreement to avoid confrontation, which had been escalating in the last few years. They said to be working on a legal solution for the problems. Regarding this issue Gabino Cué has argued to defend the Chimalapas area from invasions, but the building of municipalities from Chiapas has not stopped. In 2015, the establishment of municipal authorities in Belisario Domínguez was suspended pending the resolution of the Chiapas–Oaxaca border dispute.

In November 2021, the Mexican Supreme Court resolved the border dispute in Oaxaca's favour, and annulled the 2011 decree by the Congress of Chiapas that had created Belisario Domínguez.

== See also ==
- Selva Zoque
- Santa María Chimalapa
- San Miguel Chimalapa
