= Isthmus Mixe =

Mixe language of Oaxaca, Mexico

- Lowland Mixe
- Native to: Mexico
- Region: Northeastern Oaxaca
- Native speakers: (45,000 cited 1990–2000)
- Language family: Mixe–Zoque: Mixean; Mixe; Isthmus Mixe

Language codes
- ISO 639-3: Variously: mco – Coatlán, Camotlán mir – Guichicovi mzl – Mazatlán
- Glottolog: lowl1263
- ELP: Lowland Mixe

Isthmus Mixe, called Lowland Mixe in Wichmann (1995), is a Mixe language spoken in Mexico. It is spoken in the villages of Coatlán San José el Paraíso, Mazatlán, Guichicovi, and Camotlán, Oaxaca.

== Grammar ==
Isthmus Mixe uses SOV word order. It contains prepositions and postpositions, genitives and demonstratives before noun heads, and relative clauses after the head. Isthmus Mixe is usually categorized as agglutinating.

== Phonology ==
Consonants of Isthmus Mixe
	Labial	Alveolar	Palatal	Velar	Glottal
Nasal	m	n			
Plosive	p	t		k	ʔ
Affricate		t͡s			
Fricative			ʃ		h
Glide	w		j		

Dieterman believes every consonant may be modified by the addition of secondary palatalization.

Vowels of Isthmus Mixe
	Front (unrounded)	Central (unrounded)	Back (rounded)
Close	i	ɨ	u
Mid	e		o
Open		a	

== See also ==
- Norman Nordell's Isthmus Mixe to Spanish dictionary (1990) published by SIL
