= Mixean languages =

Language group

Mixean
- Geographic distribution: Oaxaca, Veracruz, Chiapas
- Native speakers: (undated figure of 252,291)
- Linguistic classification: Mixe–Zoquean: Mixean
- Subdivisions: Mixe; Olutec; Sayultec; Tapachultec †

Language codes
- ISO 639-3: –
- Glottolog: mixe1286
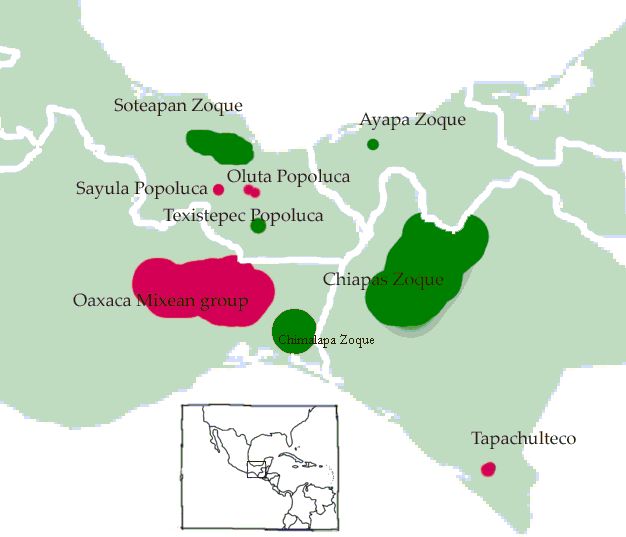
- Locations (red) where Mixean languages are spoken

The Mixean languages are a primary branch of the Mixe–Zoquean language family of southern Mexico. According to Wichmann (1995), there are three divergent Mixean languages, and a Oaxacan branch that constitutes the bulk of the family:

- Oluta Popoluca (Veracruz)
- Sayula Popoluca (Veracruz)
- Tapachultec (Chiapas, extinct)
- Mixe languages (Oaxaca, several languages - including Mixe or Ayöök)

Tapachultec has been extinct since the 1930s, Olutec is moribund, and Sayultec is endangered. However, the different varieties of Mixe proper collectively maintain upwards of 100,000 speakers.

== Demographics ==
List of ISO 639-3 codes and demographic information of Mixean languages from Ethnologue (22nd edition):

Language	ISO 639-3 code	State	Locations	Dialects	Speakers	Date/Source	Alternate names
Mixe, Coatlán	mco	Oaxaca state	Coatlán, Camotlán, Ixcuintepec, San José, and Santa Isabel	Coatlán Mixe, Camotlán Mixe	5,000	1993 SIL	Southeastern Mixe
Mixe, Isthmus	mir	Oaxaca state	San Juan Guichicovi municipality: 3 towns on the Tehuantepec isthmus near the Veracruz state border		22,500	2000 INALI	Ayuk, Eastern Mixe, Guichicovi Mixe, Mixe del Istmo, Mixe medio del este
Mixe, Mazatlán	mzl	Oaxaca state	7 towns in the east		19,200	2000	East Central Mixe, Tutla Mixe
Mixe, Juquila	mxq	Oaxaca state	Ocotepec municipality: in Juquila and Quetzaltepec	Juquila Mixe, Ocotepec Mixe	8,000	2002 SIL	South Central Mixe
Mixe, Tlahuitoltepec	mxp	Oaxaca state	Albarradas Zapoteco area: 3 towns		16,800	2000 INALI	Mixe Alto del Centro, West Central Mixe
Mixe, North Central	neq	Oaxaca state	northeast Mixe district, towns including those listed as dialects	Zacatepec, Puxmetecán, Olotepec, Mixistlan, Cotzocón Mixe (Mixe de San Juan Cotzocón), Atitlán Mixe (Mixe de Atitlán)	13,000	2002 SIL	Hayuuk, Northeastern Mixe
Mixe, Quetzaltepec	pxm	Oaxaca state	northeast Mixe district		8,090	2000 INALI	Central Mixe, Chuxnabán Mixe, Midland Mixe, Mixe Alto del Sur
Mixe, Totontepec	mto	Oaxaca state	north of Zacatepec, 10 towns		5,470	2000 INALI	Mixe Alto del Norte, Northwestern Mixe
Popoluca, Oluta	plo	Veracruz state	Oluta, inland, west of Texistepec, south of Acayucan, east of Sayula		1	2011 UNSD	Oluta, Oluta Mijean, Olutec, Popoluca de Oluta
Popoluca, Sayula	pos	Veracruz state	south of Sayula		3,030	Adelaar 2007	
