= Belisario Domínguez (disambiguation) =

Belisario Domínguez was a Mexican physician and politician. Belisario Domínguez may also refer to:

- Belisario Domínguez Medal of Honor, highest award bestowed by the Mexican Senate
- Belisario Domínguez Dam, embankment dam and hydroelectric power station on the Grijalva River
- Belisario Domínguez Municipality, municipality in the Mexican state of Chiapas
- Dr. Belisario Domínguez Municipality, municipality in the Mexican state of Chihuahua
