= Belisario Domínguez Municipality =

Belisario Domínguez
- Municipality
- Country: Mexico
- State: Chiapas
- Climate: Am

Belisario Domínguez was one of the municipalities of the Mexican state of Chiapas, in southern Mexico. It was separated from the municipality of Cintalapa in 2011, although in reality it was a territory that was invaded by logging companies in the 1940s from the Zoque communities of the municipalities of Santa María Chimalapa and San Miguel Chimalapa (Oaxaca). In 2021, the Supreme Court of Justice of the Nation determined the suspension of the municipal powers instituted according to the laws of Chiapas in 2015 was lawful, despite the 2013 resolution of that same superior court, which prohibited both Oaxaca and Chiapas from establishing of municipal authorities in the territory. With this and the impossibility of holding elections in 2018, the municipality of Belisario Domínguez was abolished.

== History ==
The municipality was created in the territory that was invaded from the Oaxacan municipalities of Santa María Chimalapa and San Miguel Chimalapa in the 1940s. The territorial dispute between Oaxaca and Chiapas in Los Chimalapas began with the establishment in the region of a logging company from Michoacán, which in a non-transparent manner obtained concessions to exploit forest resources in the communal property of the Zoques of Santa María and San Miguel. Chimalapa. In these negotiations, the Sánchez Monroy company was supported by the Chiapas government. In subsequent years, new settlers from Chiapas settled on the lands of Los Chimalapas, creating new ejido groups, among them Díaz Ordaz, which was created by the Sánchez Monroy lumber company and is the largest settlement in the demarcation where the Congress of Chiapas established the municipality of Belisario Domínguez in 2011.

The lands that correspond to this municipality are in litigation before the SCJN, in a dispute between the state governments of Oaxaca and Chiapas. In 2012, the SCJN issued a resolution, instructing the governments of both entities to refrain from creating new authorities that formally or informally expand the territorial limits of one or another entity. In 2015, elections were held in the municipality of Belisario Domínguez, organized by the Institute of Elections and Citizen Participation of Chiapas, but the Zoques burned down the mayor's office and detained the personnel of the institute and one of the candidates, arguing that they were asserting the injunctions issued by the SCJN, in defense of the sovereignty of Oaxaca.

On 11 November 2021, the Mexican Supreme Court resolved the border dispute in Oaxaca's favour, and annulled the 2011 decree by the Congress of Chiapas that had created Belisario Domínguez.
