= ZOC =

ZOC may refer to:

- Zimbabwe Olympic Committee
- Zionist Organization of Canada, Zionist organization
- Zirconium oxychloride, or Zirconyl chloride, inorganic compound
- ZOC (software), an ssh/telnet client and software terminal emulator
- ZOC (band), a Japanese idol girl group
- Zone of control, the tiles adjacent to tiles occupied by objects in board wargames
- zoc, the ISO 639 code for Copainalá Zoque dialect, southern Mexico
