= Tapachultec language =

Mixe language spoken in Chiapas, Mexico

Tapachultec
- Vebetlateca
- Native to: Mexico
- Region: Chiapas
- Extinct: 1930s
- Language family: Mixe–Zoque: Mixean; Tapachultec

Language codes
- ISO 639-3: None (mis)
- Glottolog: tapa1260

Tapachultec is a Mixean language spoken in Chiapas, Mexico, in the town of Tapachula. It is now extinct.

Lyle Campbell suspected that some of its vocabulary was loaned from Nahuatl, Mam or Kʼicheʼ.

== History ==
The presence of Mixe-Zoque languages in Soconusco is speculated to go back to Izapa and the Mokaya culture. Tapachultec thus is possibly descended from languages spoken by those cultures, and may have been related to extinct varieties of the Pacific coast of Guatemala.

In the 16th century, according to the testimony of Spanish friar Alonso Ponce, it was allegedly spoken along much of the Chiapas coast, including Tonalá, Pijijiapan, Mapastepec, Huixtla, Huehuetán, and Ayutla. Ponce did not give a name for this language, but described it as similar to Zoque while possessing some Yucatec Maya vocabulary. This has been equated with Tapachultec by Lyle Campbell. At this time, Nahuatl was used by the speakers of said language to communicate with Spanish authorities. Tapachultec seems to have been termed Vebetlateca by Palacio in 1576, which probably refers to Huehuetán given that it was the chief town of the region in that era. By the 17th century, the Mam people had migrated to the area after the original population had declined due to epidemics, and the Mam language replaced Tapachultec in a few places, such as Ayutla.

Little is known about the language. According to Otto Shuman, a researcher of linguistics at the National Autonomous University of Mexico, the language was lost in the 1930s, during the tenure of Chiapan Governor Victorico Grajales. Grajales banned the use of indigenous languages in order to attempt to create a stronger bond between Chiapas and the rest of Mexico.

== Phonology ==
		Bilabial	Alveolar	Palatal	Velar	Glottal
Plosives	voiceless	p	t		k	ʔ
Plosives	voiced	b	d		ɡ	ʔ
Fricatives			s	ʃ		h
Affricates			ts	tʃ		
Nasals		m	n			
Approximants		w		j		

/b/, /d/, /g/ were in free variation with their unvoiced counterparts, and were perhaps not present at all, being mistakenly transcribed by non-native speakers. /s/ and /ʃ/ were also in free variation, while /ts/ and /tʃ/ were in conditional variation.

	Front	Central	Back
High	i	ɨ	u
Mid	e		o
Low		a	

It is unsure whether vowel length existed. Tapachultec /e/ and /a/ correspond to /a/ and /o/ respectively in other Mixe-Zoquean languages. However, Wichmann (1995) considers the data supporting this correspondence to be dubious.

== Bibliography ==
- Campbell, Lyle (1997). American Indian Languages: The Historical Linguistics of Native America. Oxford Studies in Anthropological Linguistics, no. 4. William Bright (series general ed.) (OUP paperback [2000] ed.). New York: Oxford University Press. ISBN 0-19-509427-1. OCLC 32923907.
- Orellana, Sandra Lee (1995). Ethnohistory of the Pacific Coast. illus. by Fred Folger. Lancaster, CA: Labyrinthos. ISBN 0-911437-33-9. OCLC 33487059.
- Sapper, Karl (1897). Das nördliche Mittel-Amerika nebst einem Ausflug nach dem Hochland von Anahuac (in German). Braunschweig, Germany: Friedrich Vieweg und Sohn. ISBN 9780520248120. OCLC 70337620.
- Thomas, Cyrus (1911). Indian Languages of Mexico and Central America and their Geographical Distribution (digitized facsimile at Internet Archive). Smithsonian Institution Bureau of American Ethnology Bulletin, no. 44. Assisted by John R. Swanton. Washington, D.C.: Government Printing Office. ISBN 0-7812-4044-1. OCLC 850983.
