= Proto-Mixe–Zoquean language =

Reconstructed ancestor of the Mixe–Zoquean languages

Proto-Mixe–Zoquean
- Proto-Mixe–Zoque
- (partial reconstruction)
- Reconstruction of: Mixe–Zoquean languages
- Era: ca. 2000–1200 BCE

Proto-Mixe–Zoquean or Proto-Mixe–Zoque is a language that language scholars and Mesoamerican historians believe was spoken on the Isthmus of Tehuantepec during the Initial Formative Period (c. 2000–1200 BCE). Wichmann (1995) has reconstructed nearly 600 Proto-Mixe–Zoquean lexical items.

== Ethnic marker ==
Olmec influence on neighboring groups and cultures and those who followed them suggest that they shared a similar language, or were rooted in a similar language. In later Mesoamerican languages, evidence of loan words suggests that the Olmecs influenced both material culture and the language. Many words borrowed by these early civilizations indicate a shared vocabulary of Mesoamerican cultigens (beans, squash, tomatoes, and maize) and food preparation. In A Linguistic Look at the Olmecs, Lyle Campbell and Terrence Kaufman even suggest that Proto-Mixe-Zoquean could be the language of the Olmecs.

== Phonology ==
	Front	Central	Back
Close	*i *iː	*ɨ *ɨː	*u *uː
Mid	*e *eː		*o *oː
Open		*a *aː	

*ɨ *ɨː has also been reconstructed *ə *əː.

	Bilabial	Alveolar	Alveolo-palatal	Velar	Glottal
Stop	*p	*t	*t͡s	*k	*ʔ
Fricative		*s			*h
Nasal	*m	*n			
Approximant	*w	(l)	*j		

=== Syllables ===
A vowel could be short or long, and the nucleus of a syllable could be a short or long vowel or followed by /ʔ/ or /h/.

Mixe–Zoquean languages are characterized by complex syllabic nuclei made up of combinations of vowels together with the glottal stop and /h/ in the proto-language. Complex syllable-final consonant clusters are also typical in the daughter languages and can be reconstructed for the proto-language.

Proto-Mixe–Zoquean syllable nuclei could be either:

V – short vowel
V' – short vowel with glottal stop
VV – long vowel
V'V – long vowel with medial glottal stop
VV' – long vowel with final glottal stop
Vh – short vowel with h

== Mixe–Zoque language ==
Archaeologists call this culture Mokaya, which means 'people of the corn' in the contemporary Mixe–Zoque languages. Archaeological evidence indicates that the Mixe–Zoque language was spoken across the isthmus, therefore sharing its roots in this Olmec language tradition, and a common ancestor, the proto-Mixe–Zoque.

== See also ==
- Mixe–Zoque languages
- Mixe languages
- Zoque languages
