= Midland Mixe =

Mixe language of Oaxaca, Mexico

- Central Mixe
- Native to: Mexico
- Region: Northeastern Oaxaca
- Native speakers: (29,000 cited 2000–2002)
- Language family: Mixe–Zoque: Mixean; Mixe; Midland Mixe

Language codes
- ISO 639-3: Variously: mxq – Juquila neq – North Central (Cotzocón, Puxmetecán, Atitlán) pxm – Quetzaltepec Mixe (not distinct)
- Glottolog: midl1241
- ELP: Midland Mixe

Midland a.k.a. Central Mixe is a Mixe language spoken in Mexico. According to Wichmann (1995), there are two groups of dialects:

North
Jaltepec, Puxmetecán, Atitlán, Matamoros, Cotzocón
South
Juquila, Cacalotepec

Ethnologue lists Mixistlán as well, but Wichmann counts that as Tlahuitoltepec Mixe.

A new variety of Midland Mixe has been recently documented in the village of San Juan Bosco Chuxnabá in San Miguel Quetzaltepec municipality, Oaxaca by Carmen Jany and other linguists.

== Phonology ==
Orthography from Jany (2011) is in angle brackets where it differs from IPA.

=== Consonants ===
Consonants in Chuxnabán Mixe
	Bilabial	Dental/ Alveolar	Palatal	Velar	Glottal
Nasal	m ⟨m⟩	n̪ ⟨n⟩			
Plosive	p ⟨p⟩	t̪ ⟨t⟩		k ⟨k⟩	ʔ ⟨’⟩
Affricate		ts	(tʃ) ⟨ch⟩		
Fricative			ʃ ⟨x⟩		h ⟨j⟩
Glide	w		j ⟨y⟩		

Spanish loanwords contain eight additional phonemes: /b, d, g, f, s, ɾ, r, l/.

=== Vowels ===
Vowels in Chuxnabán Mixe
	Front	Central	Back
Close	i	ɨ ⟨ë⟩	u
Mid	e		o
Open		a	

/æ/ ⟨ä⟩, /ø/ ⟨ö⟩, and /ʊ/ ⟨ü⟩ are marginal vowels. [ø] and [ʊ] only occur as allophones of /o/ and /u/, respectively, in palatalized environments, and [æ] sometimes alternates with /a/.
