= Sayula Popoluca =

Mixe–Zoque language of southern Mexico

- Sayultec
- yamay ajw tʉcmay-ajw
- Native to: Mexico
- Region: Veracruz
- Native speakers: 4,800 (2020 census)
- Language family: Mixe–Zoque: Mixean; Sayula Popoluca

Language codes
- ISO 639-3: pos
- Glottolog: sayu1241
- ELP: Sayula Popoluca

Sayula Popoluca, also called Sayultec, is a Mixean language spoken by around 5,000 indigenous people in and around the town of Sayula de Alemán in the southern part of the state of Veracruz, Mexico. Almost all published research on the language has been the work of Lawrence E. Clark of the Summer Institute of Linguistics. More recent studies of Sayula Popoluca have been conducted by Dennis Holt (lexico-semantics) and Richard A. Rhodes (morphology and syntax), but few of their findings have been published.

== Etymology ==
Popoluca is the Castilian alteration of the Nahuatl word popoloca, meaning 'barbarians' or 'people speaking a foreign language'. In Mexico, the name Popoluca is a traditional name for various Mixe-Zoque languages, and the name Popoloca is a traditional name for a totally unrelated language belonging to the Oto-Manguean family.

Natively it is known as yamay ajw 'local language' or tʉcmay-ajw 'language of the home'.

== Phonology ==
		Bilabial	Alveolar	Palatal	Velar	Glottal
Plosives	voiceless	p	t		k	ʔ
Plosives	voiced	b	d		ɡ	ʔ
Fricatives			s	ʃ		h
Affricates			ts	tʃ		
Nasals		m	n			
Rhotics			ɾ, r			
Approximants		w	l	j		

/s/ is only found in Spanish loans.

	Front	Central	Back
High	i, iː, iʔ	ɨ, ɨː, ɨʔ	u, uː, uʔ
Mid	e, eː, eʔ		o, oː, oʔ
Low		a, aː, aʔ	

Sayula vowels are short, long, and broken (i.e. glottalized, represented here as Vʔ).

There are two systems of orthography in the published literature.

- Clark (1961, 1995) uses some Spanish orthographic principles. /h/ is spelled ⟨j⟩. /j/ is spelled ⟨y⟩. /ʔ/ is spelled ⟨ꞌ⟩. /ʃ/ is spelled ⟨s̈⟩. /tʃ/ is spelled ⟨ch⟩. /k/ is spelled ⟨qu⟩ before /i/ and /e/, and ⟨c⟩ elsewhere. Similarly /g/ is spelled ⟨gu⟩ before /i/ and /e/, and ⟨g⟩ elsewhere. Syllable final /w/ is spelled ⟨u⟩. /ɨ/ is spelled ⟨ʉ⟩. Vowel length is indicated by an underline. Unassimilated Spanish loans are spelled as in Spanish.
- Clark (1983) uses an orthography closer to IPA, but as in the other orthography /ɨ/ is spelled ⟨ʉ⟩, and /ʔ/ is spelled ⟨ꞌ⟩. /s/ is ⟨š⟩. /ts/ is spelled ⟨c⟩. /tʃ/ is spelled ⟨č⟩. Length is spelled ⟨꞉⟩.

The orthography of Clark (1983) is used here.

== Morphology ==
Sayula Popoluca verbs are inflected for person and number of subject and object, for aspect, and for the difference between independent and dependent.

Intransitive independent
'walk'	imperfective	perfective	future
yoꞌy	-p	-w	-áh
1sg tʉ-	tʉyóꞌyp	tʉyóꞌyw	tʉyòꞌyáh
2sg mi-	miyóꞌyp	miyóꞌyw	miyòꞌyáh
3rd Ø	yóꞌyp	yóꞌyw	yòꞌyáh
1 excl tʉ- -ga	tʉyóꞌygap	tʉyóꞌygaw	tʉyòꞌygáh
1 incl na- -ga	nayóꞌygap	nayóꞌygaw	nayòꞌygáh
2pl mi- -ga	miyóꞌygap	miyóꞌygaw	miyòꞌygáh
3pl -ga	yóꞌygap	yóꞌygaw	yòꞌygáh

Dependency is marked by the allomorphy of the aspect markers, as shown in the following paradigm.

Intransitive dependent
'walk'	imperfective	perfective	future
yoꞌy	-Ø	-h	-wáꞌn
1sg tʉ-	tʉyóꞌy	tʉyóꞌhy	tʉyòꞌywáꞌn
2sg ꞌin-	ꞌinyóꞌy	ꞌinyóꞌhy	ꞌinyòꞌywáꞌn
3rd ꞌi-	ꞌiyóꞌy	ꞌiyóꞌhy	ꞌiyòꞌywáꞌn
1 excl tʉ- -ga	tʉyóꞌyga	tʉyóꞌygah	tʉyòꞌywáꞌn
1 incl na- -ga	nayóꞌyga	nayóꞌygah	nayòꞌygawáꞌn
2pl ꞌin- -ga	ꞌinyóꞌyga	ꞌinyóꞌygah	ꞌinyòꞌygawáꞌn
3pl ꞌi- -ga	ꞌiyóꞌyga	ꞌiyóꞌygah	ꞌiyòꞌygawáꞌn

Sayula Popoluca marks agreement in transitive clause in an inverse system (Tatsumi, 2013). Speech Act Participants (SAP) 1EXCL, 1INCL, and 2 outrank 3. There is a separate system in which a topical 3rd person (PROXIMATE) outranks a non-topical 3rd person (OBVIATIVE). The pattern of person marking is given in Table I (adapted from Tatsumi, 2013:88).

Independent Transitive person markers
			Object				
			SAP			Non-SAP	
			1EXCL	1INCL	2	3PROX	3OBV
Subject	SAP	1EXCL			tʉ=	tʉn=	
Subject	SAP	1INCL				na=	
Subject	SAP	2	ꞌiš=			in=	
Subject	Non-SAP	3PROX	tʉ=š-	na=š-	ꞌi=š-		ꞌi=
Subject	Non-SAP	3OBV	tʉ=š-	na=š-	ꞌi=š-	ꞌigi=	

Table I

The inverse system is also reflected in the form of the plural marker. In the case in which a higher ranking singular acts on a lower ranking plural, the plural marker is -kʉš-, elsewhere the plural is as in the singular, -ka-. An example paradigm is given below:

Transitive independent
imperfective		sg object				pl object				
	yu꞉giy- 'cure'	1	2	3		1excl	1incl	2	3	
sg subj	1	—	tʉyu꞉gip	tʉnyu꞉gip		—	—	tʉyu꞉gigʉšp	tʉnyu꞉gigʉšp	
sg subj	2	ꞌišyu꞉gip	—	ꞌinyu꞉gip		ꞌišyu꞉gigap	—	—	ꞌinyu꞉gigʉšp	
sg subj	3	tʉšyu꞉gip	ꞌišyu꞉gip		ꞌiyu꞉gip	tʉšyu꞉gigap	našyu꞉gigap	ꞌišyu꞉gigap		ꞌiyu꞉gigʉšp
				ꞌigiyu꞉gip					ꞌigiyu꞉gigap	

Inversion affects he allomorphy of both the person marking and the aspect marking (Clark (1961:195) with the result that the inverse forms have no distinct dependent form.

Transitive dependent
imperfective		sg object				pl object				
	yu꞉giy- 'cure'	1	2	3		1excl	1incl	2	3	
sg subj	1	—	tʉyu꞉giy	tʉšyu꞉giy		—	—	tʉyu꞉gigʉš	tʉšyu꞉gigʉš	
sg subj	2	ꞌišyu꞉gip	—	ꞌišyu꞉giy		ꞌišyu꞉gigap	—	—	ꞌišyu꞉gigʉš	
sg subj	3	tʉšyu꞉gip	ꞌišyu꞉gip		ꞌigiyu꞉giy	tʉšyu꞉gigap	našyu꞉gigap	ꞌišyu꞉gigap		ꞌigiyu꞉gigʉš
				ꞌigiyu꞉gip					ꞌigiyu꞉gigap	

== Bibliography ==
- Clark, Lawrence E. 1959. "Phoneme classes in Sayula Popoluca." Studies in Linguistics 14:25-33.
- Clark, Lawrence E. 1961. "Sayula Popoluca Texts, with Grammatical Outline". Linguistic Series, 6. Norman, Oklahoma: Summer Institute of Linguistics of the University of Oklahoma.
- Clark, Lawrence E. 1962. "Sayula Popoluca Morpho-Syntax. ''International Journal of American Linguistics'' 28(3):183-198.
- Clark, Lawrence E. 1977. "Linguistic Acculturation in Sayula Popoluca." ''International Journal of American Linguistics'' 43(2):128-138.
- Clark, Lawrence E. 1983. "Sayula Popoluca Verb Derivation". Amerindian Series, 8. Dallas, Texas: Summer Institute of Linguistics.
- Clark, Lawrence E. 1995. Vocabulario popoluca de Sayula: Veracruz, México. Serie de vocabularios y diccionarios indígenas "Mariano Silva y Aceves", 104. Tucson: Instituto Lingüístico de Verano.
- Havlicek, Corey. "An analysis of the privileged syntactic argument in three Sayula Popoluca texts." Master's thesis, The University of North Dakota, 2021.
- Holt, Dennis. 1998. Review of Vocabulario popoluca de Sayula: Veracruz, México. By Lawrence E. Clark. Language 74.2:438-40.
- Holt, Dennis. 2002. "Poemo Sayula Popoluca". The Third Page.
- Sistema de Información Cultural, Government of Mexico. 26 January 2007. Mixe–popoluca de Oluta, Mixe–popoluca de Sayula
- Tatsumi, Tomoko. 2013. Inversion in Sayula Popoluca. 言語研究（Gengo Kenkyu）144: 83–101.
