= Zoque languages =

Mixe–Zoquean language branch of Mexico

Zoque
- O'de püt
- Geographic distribution: Chiapas, Oaxaca, Tabasco
- Ethnicity: Zoques
- Native speakers: 110,000 "Zoque" and "Sierra Popoluca" (2020 census)
- Linguistic classification: Mixe–Zoquean: Zoque
- Subdivisions: Gulf Zoquean; Chimalapa Zoque; Chiapas Zoque; ? Epi-Olmec

Language codes
- Glottolog: zoqu1261
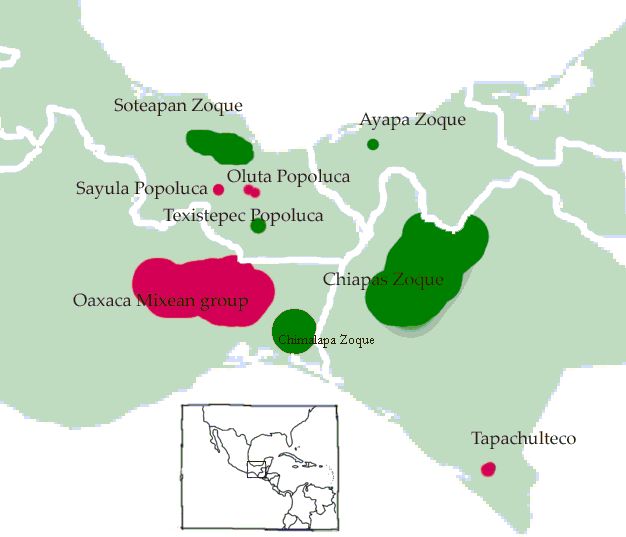
- Locations (green) where Zoquean languages are spoken

The Zoque (/ˈsoʊkeɪ/) languages form a primary branch of the Mixe–Zoquean language family indigenous to southern Mexico by the Zoque people. There are over 100,000 speakers of Zoque languages. 74,000 people reported their language to be "Zoque" in a 2020 census, and an additional 36,000 reported their language to be Sierra Popoluca. Most of the remaining 8,400 "Popoluca" speakers are presumably also Zoque. Central (Copainalá) Zoque-language programming is carried by the CDI's radio station XECOPA, broadcasting from Copainalá, Chiapas.

== Languages ==
Zoquean languages fall in three groups:

- Gulf Zoquean (Veracruz Zoque)
  - Sierra Popoluca (Soteapan Zoque)
  - Texistepec Popoluca
  - Ayapa Zoque (Tabasco Zoque)
  Oaxacan Zoque
  - Chimalapa Zoque (dialects: Santa María Chimalapa, San Miguel Chimalapa)
  Chiapas Zoque
  - Copainalá Zoque
  - Francisco León Zoque
  - Rayón Zoque (a dialect cluster)
    Prayer book in Zoque from the 17th century

Justeson and Kaufman also classify Epi-Olmec as a Zoquean language, although this claim is disputed by Andrew Robinson.

== Demographics ==
List of ISO 639-3 codes and demographic information of Mixean languages from Ethnologue (22nd edition):

Language	ISO 639-3 code	State	Municipalities and towns	Dialects	Speakers	Date/Source	Alternate names
Zoque, Rayón	zor	Chiapas state	Rayón and Tapilula		2,100	1990 census	Zoque de Rayón
Zoque, Copainalá	zoc	Chiapas state	Copainalá	Ocotepec, Ostuacán (Ostuacan Zoque). 83% intelligibility of Francisco León [zos] (most similar).	10,000	1990 census	Zoque de Copainalá
Zoque, Francisco León	zos	Chiapas, Tabasco, Veracruz, and Oaxaca states	1. northwest Mezcalapa Chiapas: into Tabasco, Veracruz-Llave, and Oaxaca, mainly near Grijalva River, Sayula area 2. southern Mezcalapa Chiapas: Grijalva River near Angostura Reservoir; 3. eastern Mezcalapa Chiapas and Tabasco states: area surrounding northwest Guatemala tip, west bank of San Antonio River and Laguna de Naja; 4. west central Mezcalapa Chiapas: upper reaches of Grijalva River	Chapultenango, San Pedro Yaspac	20,000	1990 census	Santa Magdalena Zoque, Zoque de Francisco León
Popoluca, Highland	poi	Veracruz state	Amamaloya, Barosa, Buena Vista, Col Benito Juárez, Cuilonia, El Aguacate, Estrivera, Guadalupe Victoria, Horno de Cal, Kilómetro Diez, La Florida, La Magdalena, Las Palmas, Soteapan; Bay of Campeche, area inland between Lake Catemaco and San Juan point, towards Hueyapan and Acayucan		26,000	2000 INALI	Popoluca, Popoluca de la Sierra
Popoluca, Texistepec	poq	Veracruz state	Texistepec area east of Oluta		1	2011 UNSD	Texistepec
Zoque, Tabasco	zoq	Tabasco state	Jalpa de Méndez municipality: Ayapa		12	2016, J. Rangel	Ayapanec, Zoque de Ayapanec, Zoque de Tabasco, numte oote
Zoque, Chimalapa	zoh	Oaxaca state	San Miguel Chimalapa and Santa María Chimalapa		4,500	1990 census	San Miguel Chimalapa Zoque

== Recordings ==
- Sierra Popoluca Collection of Lynda Boudreault at the Archive of the Indigenous Languages of Latin America. Contains audio recordings and transcriptions of Zoque and Soteapan in a wide range of genres. Some files are restricted but may be available upon request.

== See also ==
- Epi-Olmec script
