= Sierra Popoluca =

Mixe-Zoquean language of Mexico

- Soteapanec
- Nuntajɨyi
- Native to: Mexico
- Region: Veracruz
- Native speakers: 36,000 (2020 census)
- Language family: Mixe–Zoquean: Zoquean; Gulf Zoquean; Sierra Popoluca

Official status
- Regulated by: INALI

Language codes
- ISO 639-3: poi
- Glottolog: high1276
- ELP: Sierra Popoluca
- Linguasphere: 69-HAB-aa

Sierra Popoluca, also known as Soteapanec, Soteapan Zoque, or Highland Popoluca, is a developing Mixe-Zoquean language of the Zoquean branch. It has 35,050 speakers (INALI, 2009) who live in the southern part of Veracruz, Mexico. Sierra Popoluca has two sister languages, Texistepec and Ayapanec, both of which are severely endangered.

The word popoluca means "gibberish” in Nahuatl, and the name Sierra Popoluca comes from the language being labelled as such at the time of conquest. To avoid the derogatory connotations of popoluca, some researchers have adopted the name Soteapanec for the language instead (named after the largest municipality it is spoken in). However, modern speakers do not seem to be concerned with the history of the word and simply see it as the name of their language.

== Distribution ==
Sierra Popoluca is spoken in the following municipalities:

- Soteapan
- Tatahuicapan
- Hueyapan de Ocampo

Other communities where it is spoken include Catemaco, Piedra Labrada, and Santa Rosa Cintepec. Nahuatl and Spanish are also spoken in nearby areas, and have influenced Sierra Popoluca through language contact.

== Writing system ==
Two Sierra Popoluca spellings have been developed, one by the SIL international and another by the Academia Veracruzana de las Lenguas Indígenas.

Sierra Popoluca alphabet (AVELI)
a	b	ch	d	dy	e	g	i	ɨ	j	k	l	m	n
ñ	ng	o	p	r	s	t	ts	ty	u	w	x	y	'

With the AVELI spelling, the long vowels are represented by doubling the letter, the glottal stop is represented by the apostrophe.

Sierra Popoluca alphabet (SIL)
a	b	c	ch	d	d́	e	i	ɨ	j	k	l	m	n	ñ
ŋ	o	p	q	r	s	t	t́	ts	u	w	x	y	z	

With the spelling of SIL, long vowels are represented with a macron below the letter and the glottal stop is indicated with the acute accent on the vowel which precedes it, except when it is between two vowels or at the end of word.

== Phonology ==
=== Vowels ===
Sierra Popoluca has twelve vowel phonemes: six distinct short vowels (front vowels /i/ and /ɛ/, central vowels /ɘ/ and /a/, and back vowels /u/ and /ɔ/) with a corresponding long vowel for each.

Vowel Phonemes
	Front	Central-Back	Back
High	i iː		u uː
High-mid		ɘ ɘː	
Mid	ɛ ɛː		ɔ ɔː
Low		a aː	

=== Consonants ===
Sierra Popoluca's consonant inventory consists of thirteen consonants.

Consonant Phonemes
	Bilabial	Alveolar	Palatal	Velar	Glottal
Nasal	m	n		ŋ	
Plosive	p	t		k	ʔ
Affricate		ts			
Fricative		s			h
Approximant	w		j		
Unspecified segment					H

Some words in Sierra Popoluca contain "an unspecified underlying segment, identified as the segment /H/. Depending on the environment it appears in, /H/ can alternate in three different ways, as described by the rules below:

/H/ Alternation Rules
(1)	H	→ː	/	V__C
(2)	H	→ːh	/	V__#
(3)	H	→Ø	/	V__wɘm

In addition to its main consonant inventory, Sierra Popoluca also has a restricted phoneme inventory consisting of eleven consonants. These consonants are considered "restricted" because the only words they appear in are either ideophones, Spanish borrowings, or stylistic alterations.

Restricted Phonemes
	Bilabial	Alveolar	Alveo-palatal	Palatal	Velar
Stop	b	d	tʲ, dʲ		g
Affricate			tʃ		
Fricative			ʃ		
Nasal				ɲ	
Liquid		l			
Flap		ɾ			
Trill		r			

=== Syllable structure ===
Sierra Popoluca's syllabic template is (C)CV(ː)(ʔ)(C)(C). Words containing examples of each syllable structure are given in the table below:

Syllables
Structure	Word	Translation
CV	[ku.'tʲuːm]	'alone'
CVː	['kɘː.piʰ]	'firewood'
CVC	['pakʰ]	'bone'
CVːC	['huːtʲʰ]	'where'
CVʔC	['kaʔn.puˀ]	'egg'
CVʔCC	[ʔa.'sɔʔps.paˀ]	'it tires me'
CCVC	['traj.tʲiˀ]	'kid, adolescent male'
CCVCC	['kruʔj.tʲiˀ]	'quail'

Sierra Popoluca has phonotactic restrictions on both onset and coda clusters. For onsets, only the clusters /tr/, /kr/, and /kw/ are allowed. For codas, all two consonant clusters must begin with one of /p, k, ʔ/, and three consonant clusters are restricted to only /ʔps/ and /ʔks/.

=== Stress ===
There are three degrees of stress in Sierra Popoluca: primary stress (which may fall on the penultimate or ultimate syllable), secondary stress (which is assigned to the leftmost syllable that is not a clitic), and tertiary stress (which falls on the heaviest syllable preceding primary stress). Words containing examples of each stress paradigm are given in the table below:

Stress Paradigms
Paradigm	Word	Translation
Primary	nümnéʔ	'He had said.'
Secondary	nǜmneʔyájpa	'They have said.'
Tertiary	nǜmmàʔyyajtáabam	'They are told.'

== Morphology ==
Sierra Popoluca is an agglutinating, polysynthetic language whose morpheme inventory is primarily inflectional and consists of roughly an equal number of clitics and suffixes, with no prefixes. The morphological processes reduplication and compounding are also observed in Sierra Popoluca.

Sierra Popoluca has three major word classes: nouns, verbs, and adjectives.

=== Suffixes ===
Sierra Popoluca has 28 suffixes, all of which can be categorized as either derivational, inflectional, or valency adjusting. Nouns only take derivational suffixes whereas verbs take suffixes from all three categories. Examples of each suffix type are given in the table below:

Suffix Examples
Suffix	Type	Function	Word	Gloss	Translation
-i	Derivational	Nominalizer	wiʔk-i	eat-NOM	'food'
-ü	Inflectional	Imperative	koony-ü	sit-IMP	'sit' (command)
-ʔüʔy	Derivational	Provisory	jawanh-ʔüʔy	fever-PROV	'have a fever'
-ʔiny	Inflectional	Optative	matonh-ʔiny	listen-OPT	'should listen'
-taH	Valency adjusting	Passive	suy-taH	lasso-PASS	'be lassoed'

=== Proclitics ===
There are 17 proclitics in Sierra Popoluca. Out of these, ten are used for person marking, three are used for valency adjusting, two are derivational, and the final two have other, unique functions. Verbs in Sierra Popoluca can take all proclitic types while nouns can take all but valency adjusting proclitics. Examples of various proclitics are given in the table below:

Proclitic Examples
Proclitic	Type	Function	Word	Gloss	Translation
ʔan+	Person marking	1st person possessive, exclusive	ʔan+ʔakʔanh	1POSS:EXCL+griddle	'my griddle'
ʔiga+	Other	Complementizer	ʔiga+Ø+teeny-W	COMP+3ABS+stand-CMP	'that [he] was standing up'
tan+	Person marking	1st person ergative, inclusive	tan+juy	1ERG:INCL+buy	'we buy'
ʔak+	Valency adjusting	Causative	ʔak+kuʔt	CAUS+eat	'feed'
ʔagi+	Other	Intensifier	ʔagi+wej	INTENS+cry	'cry a lot'

=== Enclitics ===
Sierra Popoluca has nine enclitics, six of which are adverbial, two of which are inflectional, and one of which is a relativizer. Nouns can take all three types of enclitic whereas verbs can only take adverbial enclitics. Examples of each enclitic type are given in the table below:

Enclitic Examples
Enclitic	Type	Function	Word	Gloss	Translation
+yaj	Inflectional	3rd/nonhuman plural	tzaʔ+yaj	rock+NHPL	'rocks'
+tyi	Adverbial	"just"	yüʔüm+tyi	here+just	'just over here'
+tam	Inflectional	1st/2nd human plural	yoomo+tam	woman+HPL	'women'
+püʔk	Relativizer	Relativizer	tum puktuuku yagatz+püʔk	one cloth large+REL	'a cloth that's large'
+nam	Adverbial	"still"	tzüüxi+nam	small+still	'still small'

=== Reduplication ===
Reduplication of the root (full reduplication) is observed with both nouns and verbs in Sierra Popoluca, and can be inflectional or derivational. Though generally used to convey intensity or frequency, reduplication can also express "a sense of wandering around repeating an action" when paired with the ambulative suffix -ʔoʔy. Various examples of reduplication are given in the table below:

Reduplication Examples
Function	Word	Gloss	Translation
Derivational	looko~looko	sound~REDUP	'shout'
Frequency, intensity	ʔaʔm~ʔaʔm	look~REDUP	'watch'
Ambulative	monh~monh-ʔoʔy	sleep~REDUP-AMBUL	'sleep from place to place'
Frequency, intensity	was~was	bite~REDUP	'bite repeatedly'
Intensity	ʔuk~ʔuk	drink~REDUP	'drink all'

=== Compounding ===
Compounding is observed in all word classes in Sierra Popoluca and is highly productive. Various examples of compound words are given in the table below:

Compounding Examples
Structure	Word	Gloss	Translation
N=N	mok=yooya	corn=pig	'peccary'
N=V	pooy=ʔix	moon=see	'menstruate'
N=N	tzuj-i=nüʔ	spit-NOM=water	'saliva'
ADJ=N	müj=pak	big=bone	'waist'
N=V	manük=wat	child=make	'impregnate'

== Syntax ==
Sierra Popoluca is an ergative-absolutive, head-marking language. At minimum, the basic clause can consist of just a predicate, as shown below:

ʔa+seet-pa
1ABS:EXCL+return-INC
'I return.'

At maximum, it can include an inflected complex predicate and up to three modified arguments:

ʔan+jaatunh ʔi+maʔy=chiʔ-W tunh.gak püüxiny jeʔm ʔan+yooya
1POSS:EXCL+father 3ERG+sell=give-COMPL one.another man that 1POSS:EXCL+pig
'My father sold another man my pig.'

=== Basic word order ===
Word order in Sierra Popoluca is pragmatically determined for the most part. In transitive sentences, all six possible word orders are attested, as shown below:

VSO

ʔokmü ʔi+ma?y-W ʔan+tüüwü jeʔm potro
after 3ERG+sell-COMPL 1POSS:EXCL+brother that colt
'Afterward, my brother sold the mare.'

VOS

ʔi+ʔix-W kaʔnpu jeʔm choomo nüʔ-küʔ.mü
3ERG+see-COMPL egg that grandmother water-at/during
'The old woman saw the egg in the water.'

SVO

jeʔm yoomo ʔagi+ʔi+ʔaʔm-W jeʔm tzuʔukiny
that woman INT+3ERG+look-COMPL that worm
'The woman looked intensely at the worm.'

SOV

jay=tzüüx+tyam+yaj woonyi+tyam ʔi+mük.ʔüʔy.ʔaʔy-yaj-pa
boy=child+HPL+NHPL girls+HPL 3ERG+lie.ANTIP.BEN-3PL-INC
'The boys cheat the girls.'

OVS

yüʔp many=mok ʔi+na+miny-W+ʔam ʔin+müʔüt
this young=corn 3ERG+ASS+come-COMPL+IAM 2ERG+son.in.law
'Your son in law brought this corn.'

OSV

mich ʔin+choomo dya jeʔm+püʔk mi+toy-taʔm-pa
2PRO 2POSS+grandmother NEG that+REL 2ABS+love-1:2PL-INC
'Your grandmother doesn't love you.'

In intransitive sentences, both possible word orders are attested:

SV

jeʔm toro tzaʔ-küʔüm Ø+nuʔk-pa
the bull stone-at/during 3ABS+arrive-INC
'The bull arrives at the rock.'

VS

Ø+nuʔk-W+ʔam jeʔm yoomo
3ABS+arrive-COMPL-IAM that woman
'The woman arrives.'

However, not all word orders are used with equal frequency; an analysis of over 4,000 clauses from various texts found the following distribution of word orders in transitive and intransitive sentences:

Distribution of Word Orders by Transitivity

Transitive
Order	Frequency
SVO	72.37%
VSO	5.26%
VOS	7.89%
OVS	6.58%
OSV	2.63%
SOV	5.26%

Intransitive
Order	Frequency
SV	34.86%
VS	65.14%

=== Relative word order ===
In terms of relative word order, Sierra Popoluca exhibits some structural features common to VO (verb initial) languages and some common to OV (verb final) languages. A few examples of these structures are given below:

- Possessor precedes possessum (common to OV languages)

diablo ʔi+jos
devil 3POSS+hole
‘devil's hole (hell)’

- Auxiliary verb precedes main verb (common to VO languages)

püüxiny moj-W Ø+wej-i
man begin-COMPL 3ABS+cry-DEP
‘The man began to cry.’

- Complementizer precedes complement clause (common to VO languages)

ʔi+ʔix-W+tyi+ʔam ʔiga+ʔüch dya ʔan+joʔy-kaʔ-W
3ERG+see-COMPL+just+IAM COMP+1PRO NEG 1ERG:EXCL+be.angry-INSTR-COMPL
‘He saw that I wasn't angry.’

=== Order of nominal modifiers ===
Nouns in Sierra Popoluca can be modified by determiners, adjectives, quantifiers, possessors, and relative clauses. Whether a modifier precedes or follows the noun it is modifying depends on the modifier, as illustrated below:

- Demonstratives precede the nouns they modify

ʔoy-taʔm-W yüʔp kootzük
go.and.return-1:2PL-COMPL this hill
‘We went to these hills.’

- Adjectives precede the nouns they modify

ʔi+na+miny-wü puro muja kuy
3ERG+ASS+come-COMPL pure wet tree
‘He brought pure wet wood.’

- Relative clauses may either precede or follow the nouns they modify

jeʔm ʔi+na+ʔity-yaj-W Ø+müjtam+püʔk tük
that 3ERG+ASS+be-3PL-COMPL 3ABS+big+REL house
‘They have houses that are big.’

süʔüp na+miny-ü tuum puktuuku Ø+yagatz+püʔk
now ASS+come-IMP one cloth 3ABS+long+REL
‘Now, bring a cloth that's long.’

== Recordings ==
- Sierra Popoluca Collection of Lynda Boudreault from the Archive of the Indigenous Languages of Latin America. Contains 148 archival files, including audio recordings and transcripts from a wide range of genres.

== Sources ==
- Boudreault, Lynda (2018). A Grammar of Sierra Popoluca. Mouton Grammar Library. Vol. 73. Berlin: Walter de Gruyter GmbH. ISBN 978-3-11-041167-6. OCLC 996939789.
