= Chiapas Zoque =

Zoquean dialects of Mexico

- Native to: Mexico
- Region: Chiapas
- Native speakers: (30,000–35,000 cited 1990 census)
- Language family: Mixe-Zoquean: Zoquean; Chiapas Zoque

Language codes
- ISO 639-3: Variously: zoc – Copainalá Zoque zos – Francisco León Zoque zor – Rayón Zoque
- Glottolog: chia1261

Chiapas Zoque is a dialect cluster of Zoquean languages indigenous to southern Mexico (Wichmann 1995). The three varieties with ISO codes, Francisco León (about 20,000 speakers in 1990), Copainalá (about 10,000), and Rayón (about 2,000), are named after the towns they are spoken in, though residents of Francisco León were relocated after their town was buried in the eruption of El Chichón Volcano in 1982. Francisco León and Copainalá are 83% mutually intelligible according to Ethnologue.

== Classification ==
The following classification of Chiapas Zoque dialects is from.

Chiapas Zoque

- North: Francisco León, Ostuacán
- Northeast: Rayón, Pantepec, Tapilula, Tapalapa, Ocotepec, Chapultenango, Amatán, Tapijulapa, Oxolotán
- Central: Copainalá, Tecpatán, Coapilla
- South: Tuxtla Gutiérrez (Copoya), Berriozabal, San Fernando, Ocozocuautla

== Current situation ==
There are about 15,000 speakers of Chiapas Zoque, although the number is rapidly decreasing (Faarlund 2012:3). The vast majority of speakers reside in Tapalapa, Ocotepec, and Pantepec. 80%–90% of the population in Tapalapa and Ocotepec (combined population: about 10,000) are speakers of Zoque (Faarlund 2012). 50% of the population in Pantepec (pop. 8,000) are Zoque speakers.

Before the publication of Jan Terje Faarlund's A Grammar of Chiapas Zoque (2012), the best documented Chiapas Zoque variety has been that of Copainalá due to the work of William Wonderly and other scholars. More detailed work has been done on Gulf Zoque and Oaxaca Zoque languages. Chiapas Zoque is an endangered language due to rapid language shift to Spanish among Zoque youths, although this is mitigated by the Zoque people's attempts to preserve their culture and language (Faarlund 2012:3).

== Phonology ==
Vowels
	Front	Back
Close	i	u
Close-mid	e	o
Open-mid		ʌ
Open	a	

Consonants
	Bilabial	Alveolar	Palatal	Velar	Glottal
Nasal	m	n		ŋ	
Plosive	p	t		k	ʔ
Affricate		t͡s			
Fricative		s			h
Glide			j	w	

The liquids /l, r/ mostly occur in Spanish loanwords.

== Lexical comparison ==
The following table shows how numerals in two of the principal varieties of Chiapas Zoque compare to the numerals of proto-Zoque.

Numeral	proto-Zoque	Copainalá Zoque	Francisco León Zoque
1	*tum-	tumi	tumi
2	*mehts-, *wis-	metsa	metskuy
3	*tuku-	tukaʔy	tuʔkay
4	*mak(ta)s-	makškuʔ	maksikuy
5	*mos-	mosaʔ	mosay
6	*tuhtu-	tuhtaʔ	tuhtay
7	*wis.tuh-	kuʔyaʔy	kuʔyay
8	*tuku.tuhtu-	tukutuhtaʔy	takutuh-
9	*maks.tuhtu-	makstuhtaʔy	maks.tuh-
10	*mahk-	mahkaʔy	mahkay
