= Popoluca =

Nahuatl term for various people groups

Popoluca is a Nahuatl term for various indigenous peoples of southeastern Veracruz and Puebla. Many of them (about 30,000) speak languages of the Mixe–Zoque family. Others speak languages of the unrelated Oto-Manguean family, in which case the name in English and Spanish is generally spelled Popoloca.

== Various peoples called Popoluca ==
The Mixe–Zoque languages called Popoluca are,

- Mixean

- Oluta Popoluca (Olutec Mixe or Olutec)
- Sayula Popoluca (Sayultec Mixe or Sayultec)

- Zoque

- San Andrés Tuxtla
- Sierra Popoluca (Soteapanec Zoque, Soteapan Zoque, Soteapaneco, or Soteapan Soke)
- Texistepec Popoluca (Texistepec Zoque)
- Zoque Popoluca

Among the Oto-Manguean languages, there are,

- the Popoloca languages, and
- the Popolocan languages, their containing group.

The Xincan languages, the Cuitlatec language and the Lenca of Cabañas have also historically been referred to as Popoluca, Popoloco or Pupuluca.

== Origin and current use of the terms ==
The reason for the terms' widespread usage for naming indigenous languages is that they are derogatory words from the Nahuatl language, meaning "to speak unintelligibly" or "babble". When the Spanish invaders asked their Nahuatl-speaking allies what language was spoken in a particular locality, the Nahuas would reply "popoloca" meaning in essence "not Nahuatl". The Nahuas used the term "popolōca" much in the same way the Greeks used the term "barbaros", also meaning "gibberish", to refer to non-Greek speaking strangers.

The name however stuck to many languages and has caused some confusion even among linguists working with Native American languages. This confusion prompted some kind of distinction between Popoluca languages and the spelling "Popoluca" with an "u" became used for certain Mixe–Zoque languages, while the spelling "Popoloca" with an "o" became used for certain languages of the Popolocan family of Oto-Manguean languages. Note that the name "Popolocan" is also used by linguists to refer to these languages, which include varieties of Mazatec. In Nicaragua, the Nahua-speaking Nicarao used the term "Popoluca" for the speakers of the Matagalpa language.

Although "Popoluca" and "Popoloca" are derogatory and confusing terms, they are still being used, even in academic literature and official publications of the Mexican government.

== See also ==
- Popolocan languages
- Pinome
