= List of Mexican states by Indigenous-speaking population =

Mexican states by population and percentage of Indigenous language–speakers.

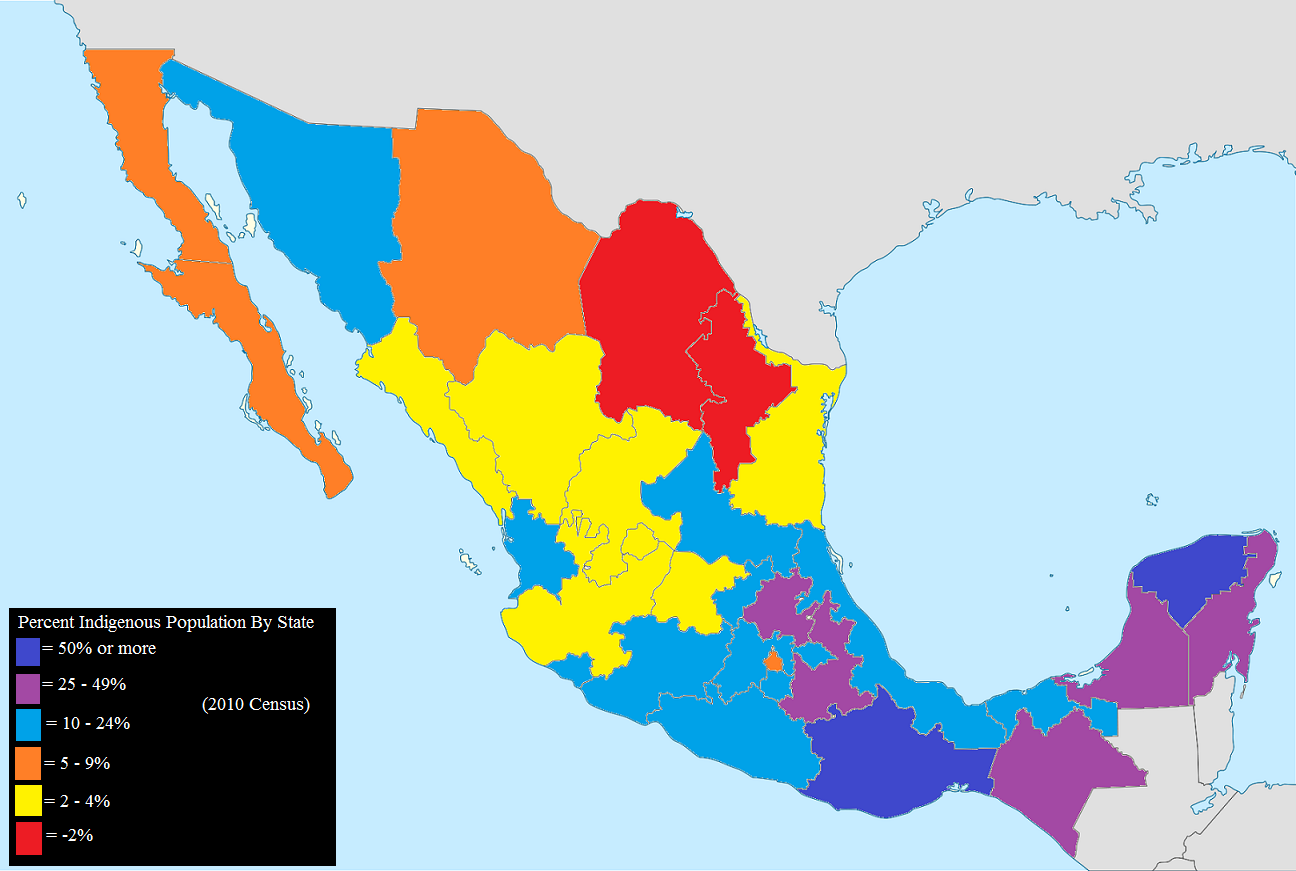
Mexican states by percentage of Indigenous peoples, 2010.

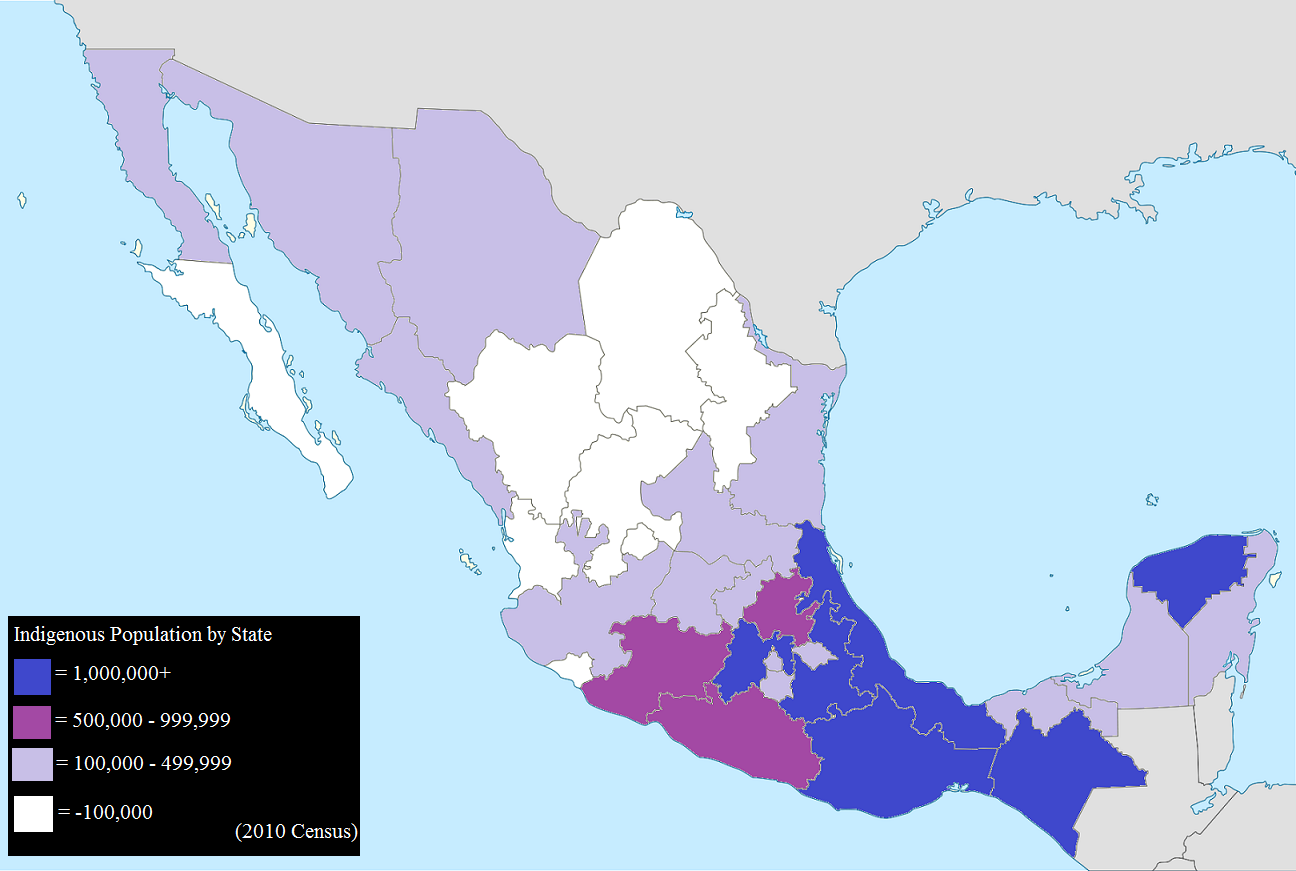
Mexican states by total Indigenous population, 2010.

== States ==
Rank	State	Speaking Population (2010)	Percentage
1	Oaxaca	1,165,186	34.2%
2	Yucatán	537,516	30.3%
3	Chiapas	1,141,499	27.2%
4	Quintana Roo	196,060	16.7%
5	Guerrero	456,774	15.1%
6	Hidalgo	359,972	15.1%
7	Campeche	91,094	12.3%
8	Puebla	601,680	11.7%
9	San Luis Potosí	248,196	10.7%
10	Veracruz	644,559	9.4%
-	Mexico	6,695,228	6.7%
11	Nayarit	49,963	5.1%
12	Michoacán	136,608	3.5%
13	Chihuahua	104,014	3.5%
14	Tabasco	60,526	3.0%
15	México	376,830	2.8%
16	Tlaxcala	27,653	2.6%
17	Sonora	60,310	2.5%
18	Durango	30,894	2.1%
19	Morelos	31,388	2.0%
20	Baja California Sur	10,661	1.9%
21	Querétaro	29,585	1.8%
22	Ciudad de México	122,411	1.5%
23	Baja California	41,005	1.5%
24	Nuevo León	40,137	1.0%
25	Sinaloa	23,426	0.9%
26	Tamaulipas	23,296	0.8%
27	Jalisco	51,702	0.8%
28	Colima	3,983	0.7%
29	Zacatecas	4,924	0.4%
30	Guanajuato	14,835	0.3%
31	Coahuila	6,105	0.2%
32	Aguascalientes	2,436	0.2%

== See also ==
- Languages of Mexico
- Indigenous peoples of Mexico
- Ranked list of Mexican states
- List of Mexican states by HDI
