= Søren Wichmann =

Danish linguist (born 1964)

- Born: 1964 (age 61–62); Denmark
- Occupation: Linguist

Academic background
- Education: University of Copenhagen

Academic work
- Institutions: Leiden University
- Main interests: Historical linguistics, linguistic typology
- Notable works: ASJP

Søren Wichmann (born 1964) is a Danish linguist specializing in historical linguistics, linguistic typology, Mesoamerican languages, and epigraphy. Since June 2016, he has been employed as a University Lecturer at Leiden University Centre for Linguistics, Leiden University, after having worked at different institutions in Denmark, Mexico, Germany and Russia, including, during 2003-2015, the Department of Linguistics, Max Planck Institute for Evolutionary Anthropology.

Wichmann's PhD dissertation, from the University of Copenhagen, treated the Azoyú variety of Tlapanec spoken in Guerrero, Mexico. He has written extensively about Mayan, Oto-Manguean and Mixe–Zoquean languages. He has done fieldwork on Mixe, Texistepec Popoluca and Tlapanec. Regarding Mixe–Zoquean, he has done comparative work resulting in the currently most accepted classification of the Mixe–Zoquean language family as well as a reconstruction of its vocabulary and grammar (Wichmann 1995). He also specializes in the study of Maya hieroglyphs — particularly the linguistic aspects of the deciphering of the Mayan script. Since 2007, Wichmann's work has increasingly focused on the development of quantitative methods in historical linguistics, including the development of the Automated Similarity Judgment Program.

Since its inception in 2011, Wichmann has been general editor of Language Dynamics and Change.

== Selected books ==
- Wichmann, Søren & Eric W. Holman (2009). Temporal Stability of Linguistic Typological Features. München: LINCOM Europa.
- Donohue, Mark and Søren Wichmann, ed. (2008). The Typology of Semantic Alignment. Oxford: Oxford University Press.
- Wichmann, Søren, ed. (2004). The Linguistics of Maya Writing. Salt Lake City: University of Utah Press.
- Wichmann, Søren (1995). The Relationship among the Mixe–Zoquean Languages of Mexico. Salt Lake City: University of Utah Press.

== Selected articles ==
- Bochkarev, Vladimir, Valery Solovyev, and Søren Wichmann (2014). "Universals versus historical contingencies in lexical evolution". Journal of the Royal Society Interface. 11 (101) 20140841. doi:10.1098/rsif.2014.0841. PMC 4223904. PMID 25274040.
- Brown, Cecil H., Søren Wichmann, and David Beck (2014). "Chitimacha: a Mesoamerican language in the Lower Mississippi Valley". International Journal of American Linguistics. 80 (4): 425–474. doi:10.1086/677911. S2CID 145538166.
- Brown, Cecil H., Eric W. Holman, and Søren Wichmann (2013). "Sound correspondences in the world's languages". Language. 89 (1): 4–29. doi:10.1353/lan.2013.0009. S2CID 145758470.
- Walker Robert S.; Søren Wichmann; Thomas Mailund & Curtis J. Atkisson (2012). "Cultural phylogenetics of the Tupi language family in Lowland South America". PLOS ONE. 7 (4) e35025. Bibcode:2012PLoSO...735025W. doi:10.1371/journal.pone.0035025. PMC 3323632. PMID 22506065.
- Holman, Eric W., Cecil H. Brown, Søren Wichmann, André Müller, Viveka Velupillai, Harald Hammarström, Sebastian Sauppe, Hagen Jung, Dik Bakker, Pamela Brown, Oleg Belyaev, Matthias Urban, Robert Mailhammer, Johann-Mattis List, and Dmitry Egorov (2011). "Automated dating of the world's language families based on lexical similarity" (PDF). Current Anthropology. 52 (2): 841–875. doi:10.1086/662127. hdl:2066/94255. S2CID 60838510.
- Wichmann, Søren, Eric W. Holman, Taraka Rama, and Robert S. Walker (2011). "Correlates of reticulation in linguistic phylogenies". Language Dynamics and Change. 1 (2): 205–240. doi:10.1163/221058212x648072.
- Brown, Cecil H., David Beck, Grzegorz Kondrak, James K. Watters, and Søren Wichmann (2011). "Totozoquean". International Journal of American Linguistics. 77 (2): 323–372. doi:10.1086/660972. S2CID 224807468.
- Wichmann, Søren, André Müller, and Viveka Velupillai (2010). "Homelands of the world's language families: A quantitative approach". Diachronica. 27 (2): 247–276. doi:10.1075/dia.27.2.05wic.
- Wichmann, Søren, Eric W. Holman, Dik Bakker, and Cecil H. Brown (2010). "Evaluating linguistic distance measures". Physica A. 389 (2): 3632–3639. Bibcode:2010PhyA..389.3632W. doi:10.1016/j.physa.2010.05.011.
- Wichmann, Søren & Eric W. Holman (2009). "Population size and rates of language change". Human Biology. 81 (2–3): 259–274. doi:10.3378/027.081.0308. PMID 19943746. S2CID 9533825.
- Holman, Eric W., Søren Wichmann, Cecil H. Brown, Viveka Velupillai, André Müller, and Dik Bakker. 2008 (2008). "Explorations in automated language classification". Folia Linguistica. 42 (2): 331–354. doi:10.1515/FLIN.2008.331. S2CID 82275473.
- Brown, Cecil H., Eric W. Holman, Søren Wichmann, and Viveka Velupillai (2008). "Automated classification of the world's languages: A description of the method and preliminary results". STUF - Language Typology and Universals. 61 (4): 285–308. doi:10.1524/stuf.2008.0026. S2CID 120424937.
- Schulze, Christian, Dietrich Stauffer, and Søren Wichmann (2008). "Birth, survival and death of languages by Monte Carlo simulation". Communications in Computational Physics. 3 (2): 271–294.
- Wichmann, Søren & Arpiar Saunders (2007). "How to use typological features in historical linguistic research". Diachronica. 24 (2): 373–404. doi:10.1075/dia.24.2.06wic.
- Holman, Eric W., Christian Schulze, Dietrich Stauffer, and Søren Wichmann (2007). "On the relation between structural diversity and geographical distance among languages: observations and computer simulations". Linguistic Typology. 11 (2): 395–423. arXiv:physics/0607031. doi:10.1515/lingty.2007.027. S2CID 8946631.
- Wichmann, Søren (2006). "Mayan historical linguistics and epigraphy: a new synthesis". Annual Review of Anthropology. 35: 279–294. doi:10.1146/annurev.anthro.35.081705.123257.
- Wichmann, Søren (2005). "On the power-law distribution of language family sizes". Journal of Linguistics. 41: 117–131. doi:10.1017/s002222670400307x. S2CID 145763086.
- Dakin, Karen & Søren Wichmann (2000). "Cacao and chocolate: A Uto-Aztecan perspective". Ancient Mesoamerica. 11: 55–75. doi:10.1017/s0956536100111058. S2CID 162616811.
