= Texistepec language =

Mixe–Zoquean language of Mexico

Texistepec
- Wää 'oot
- Native to: Mexico
- Region: Vera Cruz
- Ethnicity: 16,000 (1990 census)
- Native speakers: 1 (2018) to 370 (2020 census)
- Language family: Mixe–Zoquean: Zoquean; Gulf Zoquean; Texistepec

Language codes
- ISO 639-3: poq
- Glottolog: texi1237
- ELP: Texistepec

Texistepec, commonly called either Texistepec Popoluca or Texistepec Zoque, is a Mixe–Zoquean language of the Zoquean branch spoken by a hundred indigenous Popoluca people in and around the town of Texistepec in Southern Veracruz, Mexico.

Within the Mixe–Zoquean family, Texistepec Popoluca is most closely related to Sierra Popoluca.

Texistepec Popoluca has been documented primarily in work by Søren Wichmann, a Danish anthropological and historical linguist and Ehren Reilly, a former graduate student at Johns Hopkins University. Reilly's work was a part of the larger Project for the Documentation of the Languages of Mesoamerica, under the leadership of the University of Pittsburgh's Terrence Kaufman, and contributed to Kaufman's project of deciphering Epi-Olmec writing.

Less than 100 native speakers of Texistepec Popoluca remained when Søren Wichmann, Ehren Reilly, and Terrence Kaufman conducted their research between 1990 and 2002, and the language was moribund, with no new speakers acquiring the language natively, due to the prevalence of Spanish. Today, all remaining speakers are elderly, if any survive at all. However, according to a publication from the Program of Revitalization, Strengthening, and Development of the Languages of the Indigenous Nationals, in 2012 there was a recorded 238 speakers in Veracruz, Mexico (INALI).

== Writing system ==
Texistepec alphabet (Wichmann)
’	a	b	ch	d	dʸ	e	ê	f	g	i	j	k	kk	l
m	n	ñ	n	o	p	r	s	sh	t	tz	u	w	y	ä

== Phonology ==
The phonemes /l/ and /r/ do not occur natively within the Texistepec language. These two phonemes are borrowed from Spanish phonology and have become integrated into Texistepec phonology (Reilly). According to early work conducted by Foster another "outstanding feature of Texistepec consonants is the strong development of voicing" especially with stops and [s]. Below are his phonological rules of voicing (1943, p. 536).

/p/, /t/, and /s/ become voiced in the word-initial position.

[p, t, s]→voiced/#__

[k] becomes the voiced allophone after a nasal or between two vowels.

[k]→[ḳ]/[m, n, ŋ]__ or /V_V

According to Wichmann "Stress is not distinctive in Texistepec Popoluca. Stress is assigned to:

1. the last heavy syllable of a lexical morpheme, where a heavy syllable is defined as containing a long vowel;
2. if not to the penultimate syllable of a lexical morpheme (whether heavy or light);
3. if not to the only syllable of a phonological word;
4. if not to certain suffixes that are inherently specified for stress.
5. Stress assignment applies iteratively leftwards in a composite stem to produce secondary stresses

(1994, 469)"

=== Consonants ===
	Labial	Alveolar	Palatal	Velar	Glottal
Nasal	m	n	ɲ	ŋ	
Stop	p, b	t, d, dʲ		k	ʔ
Affricates		t͡s	t͡ʃ		
Fricatives		s	ʃ		h
Approximant	w	l, r	j		

=== Vowels ===
The vowels in Texistepec can be counted as the five listed in Table 3, for the sake of simplification and consistency as presented by multiple sources. However it could potentially include six, or even twelve vowels if accounting for the contrast between long and short vowels. According to research by Wichmann and later modified by Reilly, the vowels of this language "have a non-phonemic nasal counterpart, usually only realized in the presence of an inflectional nasal autosegment...

	Front	Central	Back
High		ɨ	u
Mid-low	ɛ		ɔ
Low			a

Vowel Phonemes

Underspecified
	ɛ	ɨ	a	u	o
high		+		+	
back			+		
round				+	+

Fully Specified
	ɛ	ɨ	a	u	o
high	-	+	-	+	-
back	-	+	+	+	+
round	-	-	-	+	+

"Long and short vowels are also contrastive in lexical representations as is evident from the following minimal pair[s]:"

t͡ʃɛːɲ 'honey'
t͡ʃɛɲ 'shit'

(Reilly 2002, 11)

pak 'bone'
paːk 'cold'

(Wichmann 2007, 40)

== Morphology ==
From Reilly's research in his undergraduate thesis he tells us "the prefix j- indicates 3rd person in the imperfective aspect. This prefix is metathesized, presumably due to its high sonority. Third person is zero-marked in the perfective aspect" (12). A few pages later we are informed that "palatalization regressively affects coronal consonants and progressively affects the high central vowel phoneme /ɨ/... TEX does not permit geminate onset consonants, and the onset is the only location where morphological rules could create the problematic /jj/" (Reilly 2002, 16). The table below demonstrates the problematic /jj/ in the word-initial position.

Morpho-Phonological Alterations

Second Person: palatal glide and nasal autosegment
(17)	'key'	'candle'	'bean'	'go'	'honey'
UR:	^{N}j-jaːpɛʔ	^{N}j-daj	^{N}j-sɨk	^{N}j-dɨk	^{N}j-t͡ʃ_ːɲ
Metathesis	^{N}jjaːpɛʔ	^{N}djaj	^{N}sjɨk	^{N}djɨk	^{N}j-t͡ʃ_ːɲ
Palatalization	^{N}d^{j}aːpɛʔ	^{N}d^{j}aj	^{N}ʃjik	^{N}djik	^{N}t͡ʃj_ːɲ
^{N}-Spreading	ɲaːpɛʔ	ɲjaj	ʒjik	ɲjik	nd͡ʒj_ːɲ
Relinking	—	—	—	—	nd͡ʒjːŋ
j-Deletion	—	—	ʒik	ɲik	—
Peak Filter	—	—	—	—	nd͡ʒiːɲ
SR	ɲaːpɛʔ	ɲjaj	ʒik	ɲik	nd͡ʒiːɲ

"This inventory distinguishes nasal stops /m/ and /n/ from oral stops /b/ and /d/, respectively.../d/ and /b/ occur in complementary distribution with /n/ and /m/, with the oral stops appearing in onsets and the nasals appearing in the codas" (Reilly 2002, 18).

Nasalization Processes
X. /^{N}-b/ → [m]

/^{N}-d/ → [n]

Y. /^{N}-p/ → [m͡b]

/^{N}-t/ → [n͡d]
/^{N}-k/ → [n͡g]
/^{N}-{ʔ,h}V/ → [{ʔ,h} Ṽ]
/^{N}-{w,j}V/ → [{w̃, j̃}Ṽ]
/^{N}-{s, ʃ}/ → [{z, ʒ}]

Palatalization Processes
A. /j-Ci/ → [Ci],/Ci/ → [Cɛ] elsewhere

B. /j-Cɨ/ → [Ci]

C. /j-s/ → [ʃ]

/j-t/ → [tʃ]
/j-d/ → [d^{j}]

D. /j-[-COR]/ → [Cj]

(Reilly 2005)

=== Aspect markers ===
"The use of a single marker... is sufficient to indicate the persons and grammatical functions... The GFM [Grammatical function morpheme] system in TEX [Texistepec Popoluca] always uses only a single prefix on a given verb." This shows a more complex pattern than a "simple accusative, ergative or aspect-split pattern. ... Group X marks the A as Ergative but leaves P unmarked. Group Y marks the Past Absolutive but leaves the A unmarked. Group Z seems to be a separate and autonomous set. This pattern, where sometimes the P is marked and sometimes the A is marked, is called inverse alternation (Reilly 2004, 53–54)."

These patterns are clearly shown in The Complete Paradigm below which breaks down the two sets in which transitive and intransitives are marked with the Ergative/nominative split with the Absolutive in a separate grouping. For more comprehensive information on the split-ergativity of Texistepec language the reader should refer to Reilly’s publications in 2004 and 2007.

The complete paradigm
Transitive			Intransitive		
ERG/NOM			ERG/NOM		ABS
Group X	1›3	^{N}-	1st Person	^{N}-	k-
Group X	1in›3	ta^{N}-	1st Person Exclusive	ta^{N}-	te-/ta-
Group X	2›3	^{N}j-	2nd Person	^{N}j-	kj-
Group X	3›3	j-	3rd Person	j-	Ø
ABS
Group Y	3›1	k-			
Group Y	3›1in	te/ta-			
Group Z	1›2	k^{N}-			
Group Z	2›1	k^{N}j-			

(Reilly 2004, 54)

Comparison of personal marker contrast between Texistepec Popoluca speakers and other Zoque languages:

	Proto-Zoque	Sierra Popoluca	Texistepec Popoluca	San Miguel Chimal	Chiapas
A
1ex	*än-	an-	n-	‘än=	(ä) N-
1in	*tän-	tan-	ta=n-	dän, tän	ndä-
2	*min-	iñ-	ny-	‘äm=	(mi) N-
3	*äy-	i-	y-	‘äy=/’ äy	y-
B
1ex	*ä-	a-	k=	dä=	∅
1in	*tä-	ta-	ta	-	tä-
2	*mi-	mi-	k=y-	äm=, 3/2 mi=Ny-	
3	*∅-	∅-	∅-	∅=	∅-
Local
1›2	*mi+än	mi+an > miñ	k=n-	mix=, mix+’än	N-
2›1	*ä+in(ʔ)	a+iñ > an-	k=ny-	mix=	N-

(Wichmann 2004, 209)

Personal aspect markers

“TEX has three aspects, Imperfective, Perfective and Future. (Reilly 2002, 22)” Most of the information on aspect marking comes from Reilly’s research from his written works from 2002 and 2004. The following explanations may help to clarify the table below, which is an illustration of the person marking affixes used on the verbs in Texistepec. There are two ‘paradigms’ which represent the differences in the ergative-absolutive split observed in this language.

“Aspect marking occurs in the derivation process after the verb has been inflected to agree with the person a grammatical function of its arguments. Imperfective aspect is indicated by a proclitic ʔu, and Perfective aspect is indicated by a proclitic maʔ.” ... “A third aspect functions very much like a future tense, indicated by a suffix –p(ɛʃ)” (Reilly 2004b, 36-7).” The future aspect “refers to all future events, and events with distinct beginnings in the present moment” (Reilly 2002, 38). Perfective has a definite beginning and end, prior to the moment of utterance. Imperfective verbs are progressive or habitual.

“The cross-referencing of core arguments in Texistepec Popoluca employs a paradigm of affixes (Set A) and a paradigm of clitics (Set B).... Also, cross-referencing for first and second persons always aligns with the verb stem, often at the expense of any third person argument in the clause. This is known as “inverse alignment” (Klaiman 1993). In Texistepec Popoluca, inverse clauses ... lack subject agreement. (Reilly 2004a, 133)"

Subj›Obj (any asp’t)	Subj›Obj (any asp’t)	Subj (imperf.)	Subj (perf., fut)
1›3 1st-A /^{N}-/	3›1 1st-B /k+/	1 1st-A /^{N}-/	1 1st-B /k+/
2›3 2nd-A /j-^{N}-/	3›2 2nd-B /k+j-/	2 2nd-A /j-^{N}-/	2 2nd-B /k+j-/
3›3 3rd-A /j-/		3 3rd-A /j-/	3 ∅
1›2 /k+^{N}-/; 2›1 /k+j^{N}-/ = portmanteau

Cross-referencing morphology for all possible argument structures (Reilly 2007, 1581)

Here are a couple of examples from Reilly that are supposed to demonstrate how these agreement markings grammatically change the sentence.

“inverse clauses lack subject agreement.

maʔ ∅- ⁿʔaʔm
PERF 3B-1A- see
"I saw him/her/it" (Reilly 2004a, 134)

maʔ k+ ʔaʔm
PERF 1B+ see
‘She/he/it saw me.’

Ergativity split in the Imperfective tense (using Set A)

ʔu+ {} -wɛj
IMPFV+ 1A- howl
‘I am howling.’

maʔ # k+ wɛj
PERF # 1B+ howl
‘I howled.’

k+ wɛj -p
1B+ howl -FUT
‘I will howl.’ (Reilly 2004b, 8)”

== Numbers ==
Once believed that native words for many numbers had been lost with the assimilation of Spanish, a little-known word list compiled by Dr. Eustorjio Calderón in 1892 was lost for some time which now “provides comparative data for number systems used in Oluta, Sayula, and Texistepec, in southern Veracruz, Mexico. The data are surprisingly accurate, considering that they were collected by a medical doctor who made a hobby of collecting word lists of little-known languages. (Clark 1982, 223)”

Numbers	Calderón’s notations	phonemic script	Clark's forms
1	tum	tum	tum
2	huisna	wisna	wɨsna'
3	tuguná	tuguná	túguna'
4	bacsná	baksná	báksna'
5	bosná	bosná	bósna'
6	tujná	tuhná	túhna'
7	huestujná	westuhná	wɨstúhna’
8	tugtujná	tuhtuhná	tuktúhna’
9	bacstujná	bakstuhná	bakstúhna’
10	bacná	bakná	bákna’
11	bactumná	baktumná	baktúmna’
12	bac’huisná	bakwisná	bakẃɨsna’
13	bactuguná	baktuguná	baktúguna’
14	bacbacsná	bakbaksná	bakbáksna’
15	bacbosná	bakbosná	(bakbósna’)
16	bactujná	baktuhná	(baktúhna’)
17	bac’huestujná	bakwestuhná	(bakwɨstúhna’)
18	bactujtujná	baktuhtuhná	(baktuhtúhna’)
19	bacbacstunjá	bakbakstuhná	(bakbakstúhna’)
20	ipxñá	ipšñá	é'pšña’
21	ipxtumná	ipštumná	(e'pštúmna')
30	ipxcomoc	ipškomok	(e'pškomak)
31	ipxcomoctumná	ipškomoktumná	(e'pškomaktúmna')
40	vusskipx	vuuskipš	(wɨske'pš)
50	vuuskipx comöc	vusskipškomɨk	(wɨske'pškomak)
60	tuguipx	tugu ipš	(tuguk'pš)
70	tuguipx comöc	tugu ipš komɨk	(tuguke'pškomak)
80	bac chipx	bak čipš	(bakské'pš)
90	bac chipx comöc	bak čipš komɨk	(bakske'pšbákna')
100	box	boš	boské'pš
400	bacsnabox	baksnaboš	baksnaboš
1,000	bacnabox	baknaboš	baknaboš

“Where I have not actually heard the forms but can reasonably reconstruct them from other data, these are included in the third column in parentheses. (Clark 1982, 225)”

Gender

“No distinction is made between male and female lines. No distinction as to sex is made except in reciprocal affinal terms. (Foster 1949, 334)”

Word order

Word order in this language is “essentially free, with the verb inflection being the sole indicator of the grammatical functions of the arguments of the verb. The variation between word order is typically used for pragmatic emphasis and focus... The influence of SVO Spanish grammar school education seems to have made SVO also the more socially elite word order, since only people who have attended school have been chastised for their ‘backwards’ VOS use. (Reilly 2002, 35)”

Clauses, etc.

Wichmann’s research 2000 determined that “Texistepec Popoluca makes little use of adjectives, conjoined phrases, passives, participles, or subordination” (420). Reilly mentions that “Texistepec has a class of modifiers whose status as either adjective or adverb is unclear, but which always show agreement with the subject of the clause... always uses Set A” (referring to The Complete Paradigm presented above)(2007, 1574).

== Bibliography ==
- Clark, Lawrence (1982). "An Obsolete Numbering System Uncovered". International Journal of American Linguistics. 48 (2): 223–225. doi:10.1086/465729. S2CID 263035011.
- Foster, George M. (1943). "The geographical, linguistic, and cultural position of the Popoluca of Veracruz". American Anthropologist. 45 (4, Part 1): 531–546. doi:10.1525/aa.1943.45.4.02a00040.
- Foster, George M. (1949). "Sierra Popoluca kinship terminology and its wider relationships". Southwestern Journal of Anthropology. 5 (4): 330–344. doi:10.1086/soutjanth.5.4.3628593. S2CID 146834397.
- INALI (Instituto Nacional de Lenguas Indígenas). 2009. Programa de Revitalización, Fortalecimiento y Desarrollo de las Lenguas Indígenas Nacionales 2008-2012.
- Reilly, Ehren (2002). A Survey of Texistepec Popoluca Verbal Morphology (BA thesis). Northfield, MN: Carleton College.
- Reilly, Ehren M. (2004a). Ergativity and agreement splits at the syntax/phonology interface (PDF) (MA thesis). Johns Hopkins University. Archived from the original (PDF) on 2008-12-21.
- Reilly, Ehren M. (2004b). "Promiscuous paradigms and the morphologically conditioned 'ergative split' in Texistepec Popoluca (Zoquean)". Annual Meeting of the Berkeley Linguistics Society. 30 (2). doi:10.3765/bls.v30i2.913.
- Reilly, Ehren (2006). Bateman, L.; Werle, A.; O’Keefe, M.; Reilly, E. (eds.). "Choosing just the right amount of over-application: An acquisition puzzle in Texistepec Popoluca". University of Massachusetts Occasional Papers. 33: Papers in Optimality Theory III.
- Reilly, Ehren (2007). "Morphological and phonological sources of split ergative agreement". Lingua. 117 (9): 1566–1590. doi:10.1016/j.lingua.2006.06.007.
- Wichmann, Søren (1994). "Underspecification in Texistepec Popoluca phonology". Acta Linguistica Hafniensia. 27 (2): 267–285. doi:10.1080/03740463.1994.10420421.
- Wichmann, Søren (2004). "La gramaticalización de un paradigma de auxiliares en popoluca de Texistepec". In Barreras Aguilar, Isabel; Castro Llamas, Mirna (eds.). VII Encuentro Internacional de Lingüística en el Noroeste. Hermosillo: Editorial Unison. pp. 205–220. ISBN 9706892311.
