= Mixe–Zoque languages =

Language family of Mexico

Mixe–Zoque
- Mije–Soke
- Geographic distribution: Mesoamerica: Mexico Oaxaca, Chiapas, Tabasco, Veracruz
- Linguistic classification: Totozoquean ?: Mixe–Zoque
- Proto-language: Proto-Mixe–Zoquean
- Subdivisions: Mixean; Zoquean (Olmeci?)

Language codes
- Glottolog: mixe1284
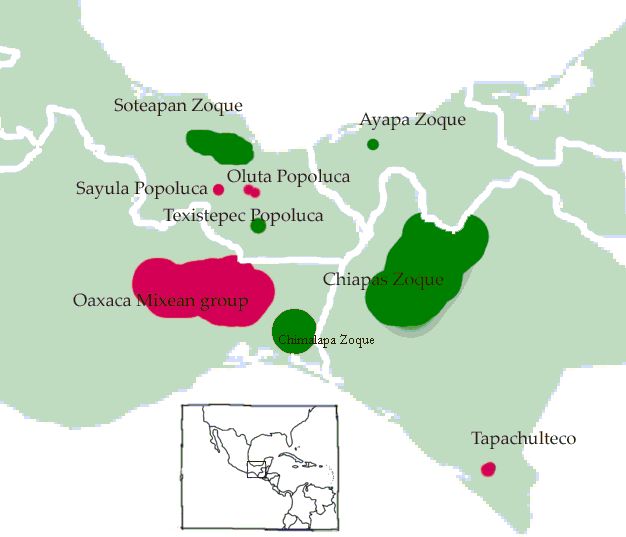
- Locations where the Mixe–Zoque languages are spoken: Mixe (red) and Zoque (green)

The Mixe–Zoque /ˌmiːheɪˈsoʊkeɪ/ (also Mixe–Zoquean, Mije–Soke, Mije–Sokean) languages are a language family whose living members are spoken in and around the Isthmus of Tehuantepec, Mexico. The Mexican government recognizes three distinct Mixe–Zoquean languages as official: Mixe or ayook with 188,000 speakers, Zoque or o'de püt with 88,000 speakers, and the Popoluca languages of which some are Mixean and some Zoquean with 69,000 speakers. However, the internal diversity in each of these groups is great. Glottolog counts 19 different languages, whereas the current classification of Mixe–Zoquean languages by Wichmann (1995) counts 12 languages and 11 dialects. Extinct languages classified as Mixe–Zoquean include Tapachultec, formerly spoken in Tapachula, along the southeast coast of Chiapas.

== History ==
Historically the Mixe–Zoquean family may have been much more widespread, reaching into the Soconusco region and the Guatemalan Pacific coast to the southeast, and to the Papaloapan River to the west, in the towns of Otatitlán, San Juan Bautista Tuxtepec, Chacaltianguis, and Guaspaltepec (near Playa Vicente). It has been hypothesized that Mixean speakers were present, and perhaps represented ruling classes, at the preclassic sites of Kaminaljuyu, Takalik Abaj, and Izapa.

Terrence Kaufman and Lyle Campbell have argued, based on a number of widespread loanwords in other Mesoamerican languages, that it is likely that the Olmec people, generally seen as the earliest dominating culture of Mesoamerica, spoke a Mixe–Zoquean language. Kaufman and John Justeson also claim to have deciphered a substantial part of the text written in Isthmian script (called also by them and some others 'Epi-Olmec') which appears on La Mojarra Stela 1, based upon their deciphering of the text as representing an archaic Mixe–Zoquean language. Languages with proposed Mixe-Zoque loanwords include Totonac, Nahuatl, Purepecha, Matlatzinca, Mayan languages, Zapotec, Huave, Xinca, Tol, and Lenca.

Both of these claims have been criticized: Michael D. Coe and David Stuart argue that the surviving corpus of the few known examples of Isthmian inscriptions is insufficient to securely ground any proposed decipherment. Their attempt to apply Kaufman's and Justeson's decipherments to other extant Isthmian material failed to produce any meaningful results. Wichmann (1995) criticizes certain proposed Mixe–Zoquean loans into other Mesoamerican languages as being only Zoquean, not Mixean, which would put the period of borrowing much later than the Proto-Mixe–Zoquean time-frame in which the Olmec culture was at its height. The date of the Mixe–Zoque split has however since been pushed back, and the argument is therefore much weaker than it once was thought to be.

Later, Kaufman (2001), again on the basis of putative loans from Mixe–Zoque into other Mesoamerican languages, argued a Mixe–Zoquean presence at Teotihuacan, and he ascribed to Mixe–Zoquean an important role in spreading a number of the linguistic features that later became some of the principal commonalities used in defining the Mesoamerican Linguistic Area.

Brian Stross proposed that the so-called "language of Zuyua", which was used by some of the nobility and priesthood of the postclassic Yucatan region, may have been a Mixean language.

=== Genetic relations with other families ===
The Mixe–Zoque languages have been included in several long-range classification proposals, e.g. in Edward Sapir's "Mexican Penutian" branch of his proposed Penutian linguistic superfamily, or as part of the Macro-Mayan proposal by Norman McQuown which groups together the Mixe–Zoque languages with the Mayan languages and the Totonacan languages. At the end of the last century, Lyle Campbell dismissed most earlier comparisons as methodologically flawed, but considered the Macro-Mayan proposal the most promising, but yet unproven hypothesis. In two more recently published articles, evidence is presented for linking the Mixe–Zoque languages either with the Totonacan languages ("Totozoquean"), or with the Mayan languages.

== Classification ==
=== Wichmann (1995) ===
The following internal classification of the Mixe–Zoquean languages is by Søren Wichmann (1995).

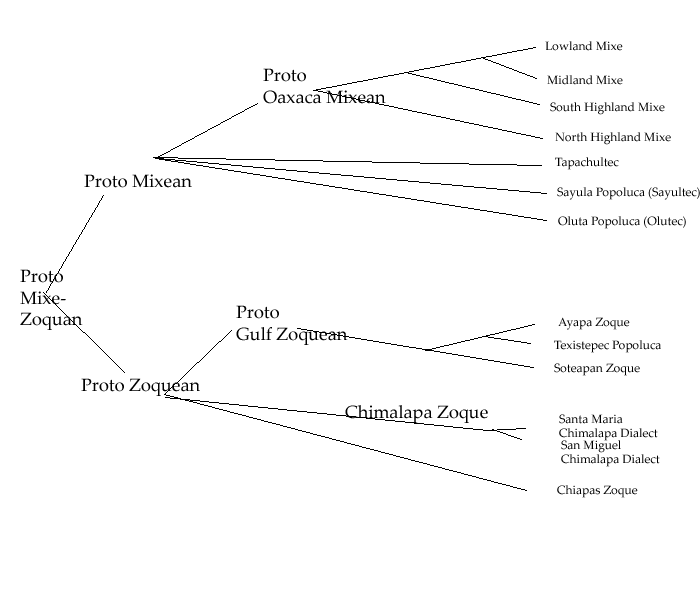
Mixe–Zoquean classification by Søren Wichmann (1995)

- Proto-Mixe-Zoquean
  - Proto-Mixean
    - Tapachultec
    - Sayula Popoluca (Sayultec)
    - Oluta Popoluca (Olutec)
    - Proto-Oaxaca Mixean
      - North Highland Mixe
      - South Highland Mixe
      - Midland Mixe, Lowland Mixe
  - Proto-Zoquean
    - Proto-Gulf Zoquean
    - Chimalapa Zoque
    - Chiapas Zoque

=== Kaufman & Justeson (2000) ===
The following internal classification of the Mixe–Zoquean languages is by Kaufman & Justeson (2000), cited in Zavala (2000). Individual languages are marked by italics.

- Mixe-Zoque
  - Mixe
    - Tapachultec
    - Olutec
    - Mixe Proper
      - Sayultec
      - (branch)
        - Lowland Mixe
        - Highland Mixe
  - Zoque
    - Gulf Zoquean
      - Soteapan Zoque (Sierra Popoluca)
      - (branch)
        - Texistepec Zoque
        - Ayapanec Zoque
    - Zoque
      - Chiapas Zoque
      - Oaxaca Zoque

Justeson and Kaufman also classify the language represented in the Epi-Olmec script as an early Zoquean language.

== Phonology ==
The phoneme inventory of Proto-Mixe–Zoquean as reconstructed by Wichmann (1995) can be seen to be relatively simple, but many of the modern languages have been innovative; some have become quite vowel rich, and some also have introduced a fortis–lenis contrast in the stop series. Although the lateral phoneme /l/ is found in a few words in some of the languages, these are probably of onomatopoeic origin.

	Front	Central	Back
Close	*i *iː	*ɨ *ɨː	*u *uː
Mid	*e *eː		*o *oː
Open		*a *aː	

*ɨ *ɨː has also been reconstructed *ə *əː.

	Bilabial	Alveolar	Alveolo-palatal	Velar	Glottal
Stop	*p	*t	*t͡s	*k	*ʔ
Fricative		*s			*h
Nasal	*m	*n			
Approximant	*w		*j		

=== Syllables ===
Mixe–Zoquean languages are characterized by complex syllabic nuclei made up of combinations of vowels together with the glottal stop and /h/ in the proto-language. Complex syllable-final consonant clusters are also typical in the daughter languages and can be reconstructed for the proto-language.

Proto-Mixe–Zoquean syllable nuclei could be either:

V – short vowel
V' – short vowel with glottal stop
VV – long vowel
V'V – long vowel with medial glottal stop
VV' – long vowel with final glottal stop
Vh – short vowel with h

== Grammatical features ==
The Mixe–Zoquean languages are head-marking and polysynthetic, with morphologically complex verbs and simple nouns. Grammatical subjects as well as objects are marked in the verb. Ergative alignment is used, as well as direct–inverse systems triggered by animacy and topicality. In Mixe–Zoquean verbs, a morphological distinction is made between two basic clause-types, independent and dependent; verbs take different aspectual and personal affixes, depending on the type of clause in which they appear. There are two different sets of aspect-markers, one used in dependent clauses and another used in independent clauses. Three aspects are distinguished within each clause-type: incompletive, completive, and irrealis.

== Ethnologue classification and SIL ISO-codes ==
Ethnologue still uses the earlier pre-Wichmann classification, based on surveys of mutual intelligibility and comparative work by William Wonderly, as a basis for their work. This classification is not used by historical linguists, and Lyle Campbell's authoritative 1997 presentation uses Wichmann's classification.

1. Mixe languages — an estimated 90,000 native speakers
  - Eastern Mixe — An estimated 72,000 native speakers
  Dialects: Coatlán (mco), Istmo (mir), Quetzaltepec (pxm), Juquila (mxq), Mazatlán (mzl)
  - Veracruz Mixe — An estimated 4,000 native speakers
  Dialects: Oluta (plo) nearly extinct – only 100 speakers, Sayula (pos)
  - Western Mixe
  An estimated 10,000 native speakers
  Dialects: Totontepec (mto), Tlahuitoltepec (mxp)
2. Zoque languages — an estimated 60,000 native speakers
  - Chiapas Zoque — An estimated 22,000 native speakers
  Dialects: Copainalá (zoc), Rayón (zor), Francisco León (zos)
  - Oaxaca Zoque – An estimated 4,500 native speakers
  Dialect: Chimalapa (zoh)
  - Veracruz Zoque — An estimated 30,000 native speakers
  Dialects: Highland (poi), Texistepec (poq) nearly extinct – only 450 speakers, Tabasco (zoq) nearly extinct – only 40 speakers
