= Chimalapa Zoque =

Zoquean language of Oaxaca, Mexico

- aŋpʉn tzaame
- Native to: Mexico
- Region: Oaxaca
- Native speakers: (4,500 cited 1990 census)
- Language family: Mixe-Zoquean: Zoquean; Chimalapa Zoque

Language codes
- ISO 639-3: zoh
- Glottolog: chim1300
- ELP: Oaxaca Zoque

Chimalapa Zoque or Oaxaca Zoque is a Zoquean language of the municipalities of Santa María Chimalapa (settlements of Arroyo Cuchara, Arroyo Chichihua, Arroyo Pita, Cabecera Chalchijapa (Congregación), Cofradía Chimalapa (La Cofradía), Cuyulapa, Escolapa, La Esmeralda, La Esperanza, Nicolás Bravo, Pilar Espinosa de León, Santa Inés, Santa María Chimalapa, Tierra Blanca, and Zacatal) and San Miguel Chimalapa (settlements of Barrancón, Benito Juárez (El Trébol), Cieneguilla, Cuauhtémoc Guadalupe, El Palmar, El Porvenir, La Ciénega, La Compuerta, Las Anonas, Las Conchas, Las Cruces, López Portillo, Los Limones, Palo Colorado (Emiliano Zapata), Río Grande, San Antonio, San Felipe, San Miguel Chimalapa, and Vista Hermosa) in Oaxaca, Mexico.
