= Rayón, Chiapas =

Rayón
- Municipality
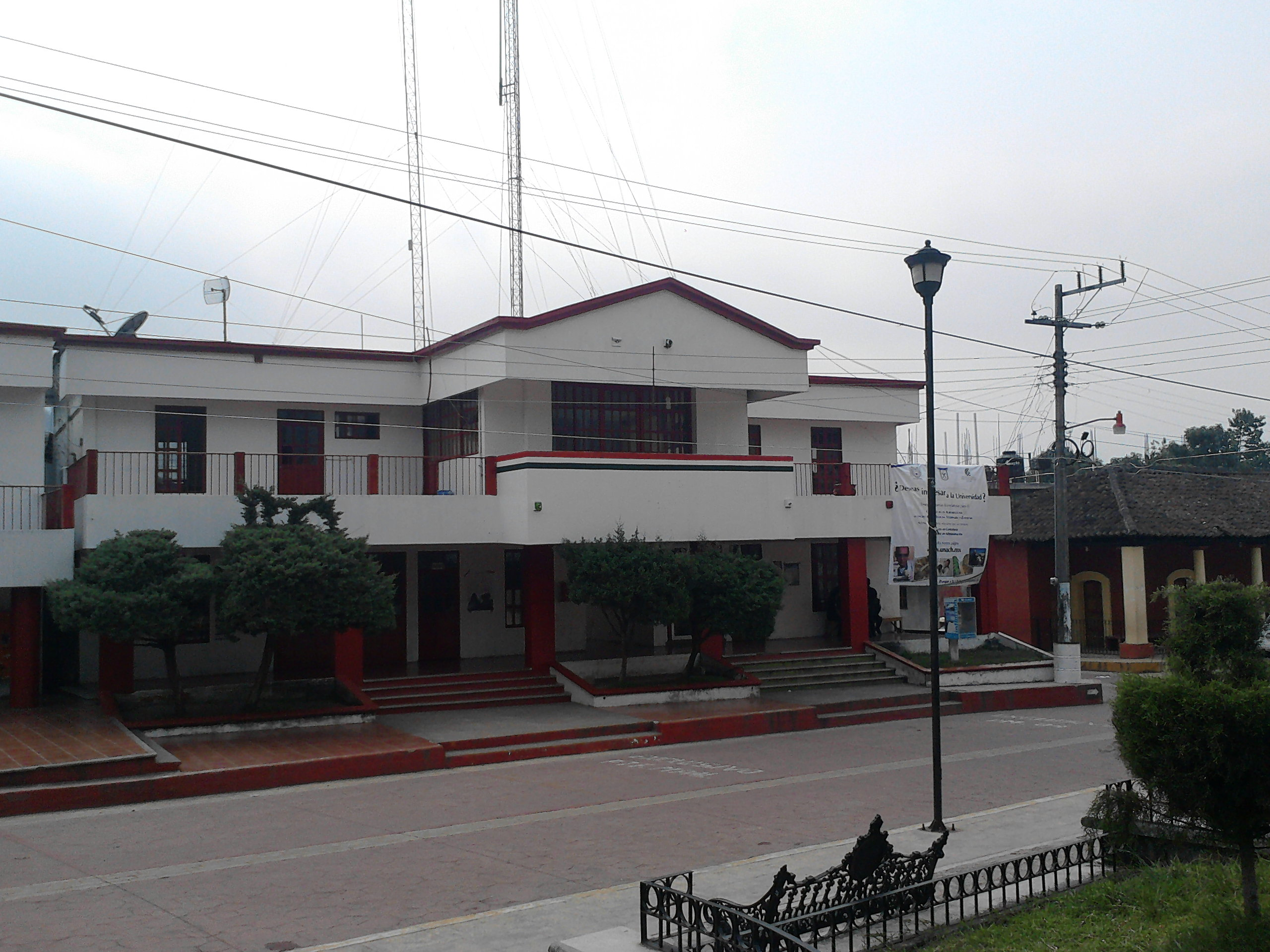
- Town Hall, Rayón

- Location in Mexico
- Coordinates: 17°12′N 93°0′W
- Country: Mexico
- State: Chiapas

Area
  - Total: 94.4 km^{2} (36.4 sq mi)

Population (2010)
  - Total: 9,002

Rayón is a town and municipality in the southern Mexican state of Chiapas.

As of 2010, the municipality had a total population of 9,002, up from 6,870 in 2005. It covers an area of 94.4 km^{2}.

As of 2010, the town of Rayón had a population of 5,895. Other than the town of Rayón, the municipality had 43 localities, none of which had a population over 1,000.
