= San Juan Guichicovi =

- Municipality and town
- Location in Mexico
- Coordinates: 16°58′N 95°05′W
- Country: Mexico
- State: Oaxaca

Area
  - Total: 563.91 km^{2} (217.73 sq mi)

Population (2005)
  - Total: 27,646
- Time zone: UTC-6 (Central Standard Time)

San Juan Guichicovi is a town and municipality in Oaxaca in south-western Mexico. It is part of the Juchitán District in the west of the Istmo de Tehuantepec region. The town was founded on 15 March 1825: Guichicovi means "New Town" in Zapotec.

== Geography ==
The municipality covers an area of 563.91 km^{2} at an elevation of 260 meters above sea level. The climate is warm and humid with rain in summer and autumn.

=== Flora and fauna ===
Flora include cassava, mahogany, cedar, oak, ceiba, spring, passion, locust, pine, Nopo, oak stand, cedrillo, orange and mamey. Wild fauna include Tepeizcuinte, armadillo, deer, badgers, skunks, boar and toucan.

== Demography ==
As of 2005, the municipality had 7,120 households with a total population of 27,646 of whom 19,367 spoke an indigenous language. The municipality is the farthest east of the Mixe communities of Oaxaca. The houses have concrete or dirt floors, concrete or masonry walls and concrete, metal or tile roofs. The town is connected by a paved road to the Federal trans-isthmus highway. There is some tourism potential, with archaeological remains of the colonial era and scenic forest-covered mountains.

== Economy ==
Economic activities include agriculture - mostly coffee, maize and beans - and more importantly raising of cattle, pigs, goats, sheep and horses. Some of the people engage in hunting and fishing. There is some logging of fine woods for furniture making, and cottage industries product palm handicrafts such as mat, backstrap and tenate basket, as well as pottery pots and jars. The Union of Indigenous Communities of the Isthmus Region, a cooperative founded in 1982, assists in production and distribution of the local products under a fair trade label.
