= Ayapa Zoque =

Zoquean language of Mexico

- Ayapaneco, Tabasco Zoque
- Nuumte Oote
- Native to: Mexico
- Region: Jalpa de Méndez, Tabasco
- Native speakers: 70 (2020 census)
- Language family: Mixe-Zoquean: Zoquean; Gulf Zoquean; Ayapa Zoque

Language codes
- ISO 639-3: zoq
- Glottolog: taba1264
- ELP: Ayapanec Zoque

Ayapa Zoque (Ayapaneco), or Tabasco Zoque, is a critically endangered Zoquean language of Ayapa, a village 10 kilometres (6 mi) southeast of Comalcalco, in Tabasco, Mexico. The native name is Nuumte Oote "True Voice". A vibrant, albeit minority, language until the middle of the 20th century, the language suffered after the introduction of compulsory education in Spanish, urbanisation, and migration of its speakers. Nowadays there are approximately 15 speakers whose ages range from 67 to 90. In 2010, a story started circulating that the last two speakers of the Ayapaneco language were enemies and no longer talked to each other. The story was incorrect, and while it was quickly corrected it came to circulate widely.

Daniel Suslak, an assistant professor of anthropology at Indiana University, is one of the linguists working to prepare the first dictionary of the language. Since 2012, the Instituto Nacional de Lenguas Indígenas (INALI, also known as the National Indigenous Languages Institute) has been supporting the Ayapa community's efforts at revitalising their language. In 2013, Vodafone launched an advertisement campaign in which they claimed to have helped the community revitalize the language, proposing an erroneous story of enmity between Don Manuel and Don Isidro. The commercial appeared on YouTube. It turned out the story was actually a lie. According to Suslak and other observers the actual help provided to Ayapan and the Ayapaneco language by Vodafone was extremely limited and did not address the actual necessities of the community. A PhD dissertation on Ayapa Zoque at the Institut national des langues et civilisations orientales (INALCO) appeared in 2019, and an orthography designed to better facilitate the development of pedagogical materials and education of new learners is under development.

== See also ==
- Language death
