= Oluta Popoluca =

Mixe–Zoquean language of Mexico

- Olutec
- Yaak'awü
- Native to: Mexico
- Region: Veracruz
- Ethnicity: 10,000 (1990 census)
- Native speakers: 1 (2018)
- Language family: Mixe–Zoque: Mixean; Oluta Popoluca

Language codes
- ISO 639-3: plo
- Glottolog: olut1240
- ELP: Oluta Popoluca

Oluta Popoluca also called Olutec is a moribund Mixe–Zoquean language of the Mixean branch spoken by a few elderly people in the town of Oluta in Southern Veracruz, Mexico.

77 self-reported speaking Oluteco in a 2020 census, but a count published in 2018 found only one remaining speaker.

== Phonology ==
=== Consonants ===
		Labial	Alveolar	Palatal	Velar	Glottal
Nasal		m	n			
Plosive		p	t		k	ʔ
Affricate			ts	tʃ		
Fricative			s	ʃ		h
Rhotic	trill		r			
Rhotic	tap		ɾ			
Lateral			l			
Glide		w		j		

Other sounds such as /b, d, ɡ, f/ occur from borrowed words from Spanish.

=== Vowels ===
Vowels are /i/, /ɨ/, /u/, /e/, /o/, /a/; each distinguished with vowel length.

== Bibliography ==
- Zavala, Roberto. 2000. Inversion and other Topics in the Grammar of Olutec (Mixean). Eugene: University of Oregon.
- Zavala Maldonado, Roberto. 2003. Obviación en Oluteco. Proceedings of the Conference on Indigenous Languages of Latin America–I (23–25 October 2003, University of Texas at Austin).
