= San Miguel Chimalapa =

- Municipality and town
- Location in Mexico
- Coordinates: 16°43′N 94°45′W
- Country: Mexico
- State: Oaxaca

Area
  - Total: 1,593.5 km^{2} (615.3 sq mi)

Population (2005)
  - Total: 6,541
- Time zone: UTC-6 (Central Standard Time)

San Miguel Chimalapa is a town and municipality in Oaxaca in south-western Mexico. It is part of the Juchitán District in the west of the Istmo de Tehuantepec region.

== Geography ==
The municipality covers an area of 1593.5 km^{2} at an altitude of 120 meters above sea level. The climate is warm temperate, sub-humid with summer rains, with 2100 mm of annual precipitation. Flora includes cedar, Guanacaste, pine, oak, Nopo, milk, yellow, mahogany, orange, banana, tangerine, mamey and nanche. Fauna includes jaguar, mountain lion (endangered), raccoon, tapir, paca, coyote, fox, badgers, anteaters, wild boar, fox, rabbit, armadillo, mazatec, monkey, parrots, pheasant, rattlesnake and coral snake.

== Demographics ==
As of 2005, the municipality had a total population of 6,541, of whom 1,988 spoke an indigenous language. As of 2000, there were about 1,675 Zoque speakers in the municipality. The municipality covers part of the Selva Zoque, an ecologically sensitive forest area.

Chimalapa Zoque is spoken in the municipality.

== Economy ==
Economic activity includes agriculture (corn, beans, squash and coffee), animal husbandry (cattle, pigs, goats and sheep) and logging of timber for furniture making. Hunting and fishing are practiced by permission in the dry season.
