= Sayula de Alemán =

Municipality in Veracruz, Mexico

- Municipality
- Location in Mexico Sayula de Alemán (Mexico)
- Country: Mexico
- State: Veracruz
- Demonym: (in Spanish)
- Time zone: UTC−6 (CST)

Sayula is a municipality located in the plains of the Sotavento zone in the central zone of the Mexican state of Veracruz, about 382 km from the state capital Xalapa. It has a surface area of 640.76 km^{2} (247 sq mi). It is located at 17°53′N 94°57′W.

== Geography ==
The municipality of Sayula is delimited to the north by Acayucan, to the east by Oluta and Texistepec, to the south by Jesús Carranza and to the west by San Juan Evangelista. It is watered by rivers of the San Juan, which is a tributary of the river Papaloapan and for other tributaries of the Río Chiquito, and the brazo de Coatzacoalcos.

The weather in Sayula is warm and wet all year with rains in summer and autumn.

== Agriculture ==
It produces principally maize, beans, rice, orange fruit, coffee, mango and green chile.

== Celebrations ==
In Sayula, in May takes place the celebration in honor to San Isidro Labrador, Patron of the town, and in December takes place the celebration in honor to Virgen de Guadalupe.

== Notable people ==
- Miguel Alemán Valdés (1900-1983), president of Mexico from 1946-1952
