= Santa María Chimalapa =

- Municipality and town
- Location of the municipality in Oaxaca

- Location in Mexico
- Coordinates: 16°54′N 94°41′W
- Country: Mexico
- State: Oaxaca

Area
  - Total: 3,572.31 km^{2} (1,379.28 sq mi)

Population (2020)
  - Total: 9,578
- Time zone: UTC-6 (Central Standard Time)

Santa María Chimalapa is a town and municipality in Oaxaca in southeastern Mexico and the easternmost and largest municipality in Oaxaca, but is also the least densely populated municipality in Oaxaca. It is part of the Juchitán District in the west of the Istmo de Tehuantepec region.

== Geography ==
The municipality has an area of 3572.31 km^{2}, much of it covered by tropical rain forest. The climate is warm sub humid, with summer rainfall of 23,000 mm. The town is at a height of 180 metres above sea level and is supplied with water by El Rio Corte, originating in the Selva Zoque forests to the east.

=== Flora and fauna ===
The forests contain many species of tree including cedar, mahogany, Nopo, Guanacaste, cedrillo, coabillo, ceiba, pine, hormiguillo, rattan, oak, oak, lime, nanche, pineapple, custard apple, tangerine and coffee. Wild fauna include boar, paca, deer, jaguar, raccoon, skunk, monkey, pheasant, parrot, owl, toucan, white eagle, rattlesnake, coral snake deaf.

== Demographics ==
Before the Mexican colonial period, the area was inhabited by the Chima, a Zoque people believed to be descendants of the Olmec. The area is now ethnically diverse, with the original Zoque people reduced to a minority of perhaps 30%. As of 2005, the municipality had 1,701 households with a total population of 8,643 of whom 3,381 spoke an indigenous language.

Chimalapa Zoque is spoken in the municipality.

== Economy ==
Economic activities include growing corn, beans, coffee and sugar cane, and raising cattle, goats, sheep, horses and poultry. Logging is practised, with a sawmill preparing fine woods for furniture production, and wild animals are hunted in certain seasons. Sport hunting is also practised by tourists. The region is extremely poor, with limited infrastructure such as roads and schools.
