= Mesoamerican languages =

Languages indigenous to Mesoamerica

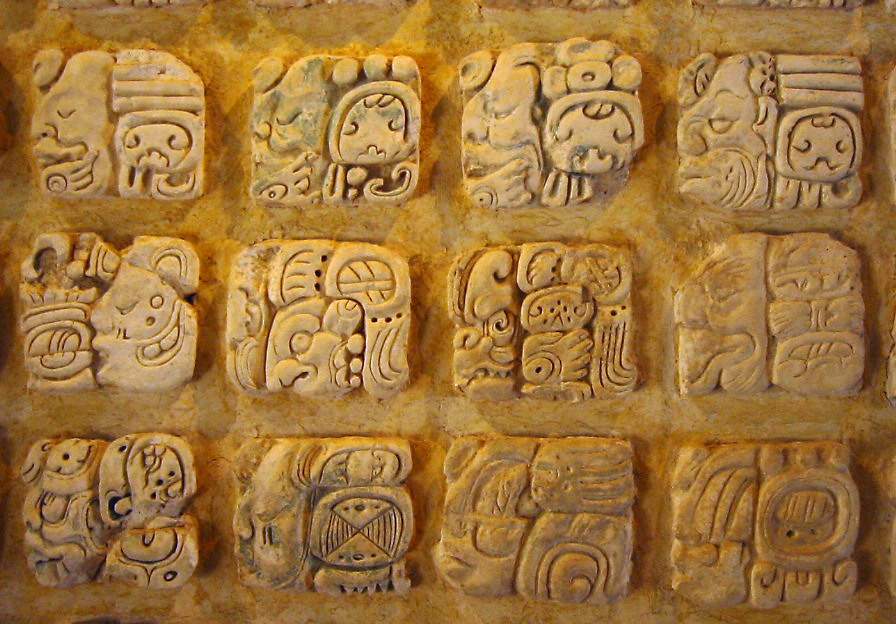
Maya glyphs in stucco at the Museo de sitio in Palenque, Mexico. An example of text in a Mesoamerican language written in an indigenous Mesoamerican writing system.

Mesoamerican languages are the languages indigenous to the Mesoamerican cultural area, which covers southern Mexico, all of Guatemala, Belize, El Salvador, and parts of Honduras, Nicaragua and Costa Rica. The area is characterized by extensive linguistic diversity containing several hundred different languages and seven major language families. Mesoamerica is also an area of high linguistic diffusion in that long-term interaction among speakers of different languages through several millennia has resulted in the convergence of certain linguistic traits across disparate language families. The Mesoamerican sprachbund is commonly referred to as the Mesoamerican Linguistic Area.

The languages of Mesoamerica were also among the first to evolve independent traditions of writing. The oldest texts date to approximately 1000 BCE (namely Olmec and Zapotec), though most texts in the indigenous scripts (such as Maya) date to c. 600–900 CE. Following the arrival of the Spanish in the 16th century, and continuing up until the 19th century, most Mesoamerican languages were written in Latin script.

The languages of Mesoamerica belong to 6 major families – Mayan, Oto-Mangue, Mixe–Zoque, Totonacan, Uto-Aztecan and Chibchan languages (only on the southern border of the area) – as well as a few smaller families and isolates – Purépecha, Huave, Tequistlatec, Xincan and Lencan. Among these Oto-Manguean and Mayan families account for the largest numbers of speakers by far – each having speakers numbering more than a million. Many Mesoamerican languages today are either endangered or already extinct, but others, including the Mayan languages, Nahuatl, Mixtec and Zapotec, have several hundred thousand speakers and remain viable.

== Language vs. dialect ==
The distinction between related languages and dialects is notoriously vague in Mesoamerica. The dominant Mesoamerican socio-cultural pattern through millennia has been centered around the town or city as the highest level community rather than the nation, realm or people. This has meant that within Mesoamerica each city-state or town community, called in Nahuatl an altepetl, has had its own language standard which, in the typical case, has evolved separately from closely related but geographically remote languages. Even geographically close communities with closely related, mutually intelligible languages have not necessarily seen themselves as being ethnically related, or their language as being a unifying factor between them. The relative endogamy of the town community has also resulted in a large linguistic diversification between communities despite geographical and linguistic proximity, often resulting in a low intelligibility between varieties of the same language spoken in adjacent communities. The exception to this rule is when a common “lingua franca” has evolved to facilitate communication between different linguistic groups. This has been the case for Classical Nahuatl and Classical Maya, both of which, at different times in history, have been used as a common language between different ethnic groups. Further complicating matters are the semi-nomadic lifestyle of many Mesoamerican peoples, and political systems which often have used relocation of entire communities as a political tool. Dialect or variant “chaining” is common, where any adjacent two or three towns in a sequence are similar enough in speech to understand each other fairly well, but those separated more widely have trouble understanding each other, and there are no clear breaks naturally separating the continuum into coherent sub-regions.

All of these factors together have made it exceedingly difficult to distinguish between what constitutes a language or a dialect in Mesoamerica. Linguistic isoglosses do not coincide often or strongly enough to prove very useful when trying to decide, and sociological factors often further cloud the picture. The significance of measurements of intelligibility (which is itself difficult to measure) depends very much on analysts' purposes and theoretical commitments. In Spanish the word dialecto has often been used generically about indigenous languages in order to describe them as inherently inferior to the European languages. In recent years this has caused an aversion to the term “dialect” among Spanish-speaking linguists and others, and the term variante has often been applied instead.

Many Mesoamerican linguistic groupings have not had different names in common usage for their different languages and some linguistic groups known by a single name show a sufficiently significant variation to warrant division into a number of languages which are quite low in mutual intelligibility. This is the case for example for the Mixtecan, Zapotecan and Nahuan linguistic groups, which all contain distinct languages that are nonetheless referred to by a single name. Sometimes a single name has even been used to describe completely unrelated linguistic groups, as is the case with the terms "Popoluca" or "Chichimeca". This shortage of language names has meant that the convention within Mesoamerican linguistics when writing about a specific linguistic variety is to always mention the name of the broad linguistic group as well as the name of the community, or geographic location in which it is spoken, for example Isthmus-Mecayapan Nahuatl, Zoogocho Zapotec or Usila Chinantec. Some language groups however have been more adequately named. This is the case of the Mayan languages, with an internal diversity that is arguably comparable to that found between the Nahuatl dialects, but many of whose linguistic varieties have separate names, such as Kʼicheʼ, Tzotzil or Huastec.

== Geographical overview ==
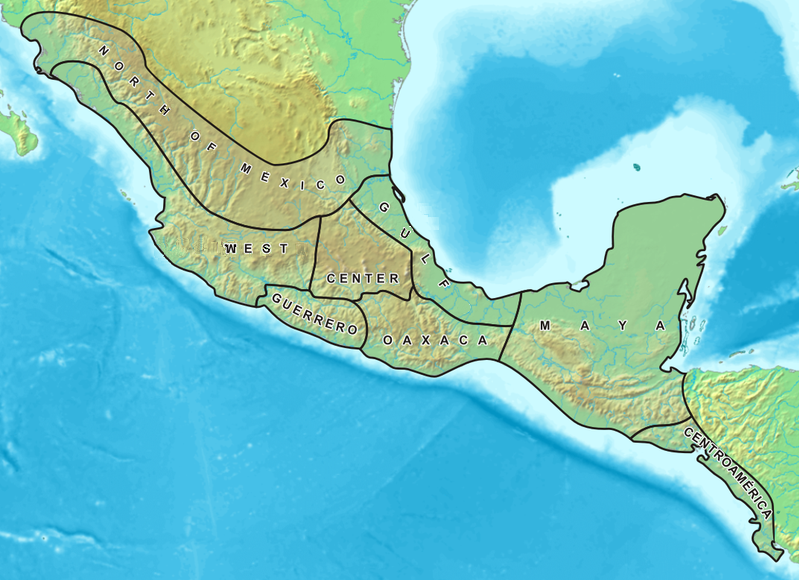
Mesoamerica and its cultural areas

Mesoamerica can be divided into smaller linguistic subareas wherein linguistic diffusion has been especially intense, or where certain families have extended to become predominant.

One such subarea would be the Maya area, roughly covering the Yucatán Peninsula, Guatemala, Belize, Chiapas and Tabasco, where Mayan languages have been highly predominant. The fringes of the area have been home to Xincan (in the southeast) and Mixe-Zoque (along the Pacific coast) speakers, in addition to Nawat (also along the Pacific coast) and the Oto-Manguean Chiapanec language (in the southwest) following postclassic migrations.

Another linguistic area is Oaxaca, which is dominated by speakers of Oto-Manguean languages, mainly Mixtec and Zapotec, both of which are extremely internally diverse. Non-Oto-Manguean languages include Mixe, Tequistlatecan, Huave, and the Nahuan Pochutec language. Huave was the original language of the Isthmus of Tehuantepec, but lost territory to Zapotec. Oaxaca is the most linguistically diverse area of Mesoamerica and its 36,820 square miles (95,400 km^{2}) contain at least 100 mutually unintelligible linguistic variants.

The subarea commonly called Central Mexico, covering valleys and mountainous areas surrounding the Valley of Mexico, originally was mainly host to Oto-Pamean languages; however, beginning in the late classic these languages were largely gradually displaced by Nahuatl, which was henceforth the predominant indigenous language of the area. Otomi, Matlatzinca, and Mazahua retained significant presences.

The Western area was inhabited mostly by speakers of Purépecha in Michoacán, Huichol and Cora in Nayarit, and Western Peripheral Nahuatl in Jalisco and Colima. A host of small undocumented languages were spoken in Colima and southern Jalisco, such as Jalisco Otomi and Jalisco Zapotec.

The Northern Rim area has been inhabited by semi-nomadic Chichimec speakers of Uto-Aztecan languages (probably related to the Tepiman and Corachol groups) as well as Pame (Oto-Mangue), and other undocumented languages that are now extinct, such as Jalisco Otomi.

The Gulf area is traditionally the home of speakers of Totonacan languages in the northern and central area and Mixe–Zoque languages in the southern area. However, the northern gulf area became home to the speakers of Huastec in the preclassic period, and the southern area began speaking Isthmus Nahuatl in the post-classic period.

The areas of Central America (excluding the Maya areas) that formed part of Mesoamerica during the preclassic were dominated by Lencan speakers. Based on toponymy, it is possible that Xincan languages were originally spoken in western El Salvador, but were replaced by Nawat after postclassic migrations. The migrations of Subtiaba and Mangue speakers, possibly also during the postclassic period, expanded the realm of Mesoamerican cultural influence to include the Pacific coast of Nicaragua and the Nicoya Peninsula, which were previously part of the Isthmo-Colombian area and probably inhabited by Misumalpan and Chibchan speakers.

The Guerrero subarea has been home to the Oto-Manguean Tlapanec and the unclassified Cuitlatec, and later Nahuatl, as well as a handful of undocumented languages along the Costa Grande.

== Linguistic prehistory ==
The linguistic history of Mesoamerican languages can roughly be divided into pre-Columbian, colonial and modern periods.

=== Pre-Columbian period ===
The first human presence in Mesoamerica is documented around 8000 BCE, during a period referred to as the Paleo-Indian. Linguistic data, however, including language reconstruction derived from the comparative method, do not reach further back than approximately 5000 years (towards the end of the Archaic period). Throughout the history of Mesoamerica, an unknown number of languages and language families became extinct and left behind no evidence of their existence. What is known about the pre-Columbian history of the Mesoamerican languages is what can be surmised from linguistic, archeological and ethnohistorical evidence. Often, hypotheses concerning the linguistic prehistory of Mesoamerica rely on very little evidence.

==== Archaic period (–2000 BCE) ====
Three large language families are thought to have had their most recent common homelands within Mesoamerica. The time frames and locations in which the common ancestors of these families, referred to by linguists as proto-languages, were spoken are reconstructed by methods of historical linguistics. The three earliest known families of Mesoamerica are the Mixe–Zoquean languages, the Oto-Manguean languages and the Mayan languages. Proto-Oto-Manguean is thought to have been spoken in the Tehuacán valley between 5000 and 3000 BCE, although it may only have been one center of Oto-manguean culture, another possible Oto-Manguean homeland being Oaxaca. Proto-Mayan was spoken in the Cuchumatanes highlands of Guatemala around 3000 BCE. Proto-Mixe–Zoquean was spoken on the gulf coast and on the Isthmus of Tehuantepec and on the Guatemalan Pacific coast around 2000 BCE, in a much larger area than its current extension. Totonacan languages, Purépecha, Huave and the Tequistlatecan languages can also be assumed to have been present in Mesoamerica at this point although it is unknown.

==== Preclassic period (2000 BCE – 200 CE) ====
The first complex society in Mesoamerica was the Olmec civilization, which emerged around 2000 BCE during the Early Preclassic. It is documented that around this time many Mesoamerican languages adopted loanwords from the Mixe–Zoquean languages, particularly loanwords related to such culturally fundamental concepts as agriculture and religion. This has led some linguists to believe that the carriers of Olmec culture spoke a Mixe–Zoquean language and that words spread from their language into others because of their potential cultural dominance in the Preclassic period, though the relationship between the Olmec and other Preclassic groups is still debated (see Olmec influences on Mesoamerican cultures). During this time the Oto-Manguean languages diversified and spread into Oaxaca and central Mexico. In the Valley of Oaxaca, the Oto-Manguean Zapotec culture emerges around c. 1000 BCE. The splitting of Proto-Mayan into the modern Mayan languages slowly began at roughly 2000 BCE when the speakers of Huastec moved north into the Mexican Gulf Coast region. Uto-Aztecan languages were still outside of Mesoamerica during the Preclassic, their speakers living as semi-nomadic hunter-gatherers on the northern rim of the region and co-existing with speakers of Coracholan and Oto-Pamean languages.

==== Classic period (200–1000 CE) ====
During the Classic period the linguistic situation simultaneously becomes both clearer and more obscure. While the Maya actually left examples of their writing, researchers have been unable to determine the linguistic affiliations of several important Classic civilizations, including Teotihuacan, Xochicalco, Cacaxtla, and El Tajín. During this time it is well established that Mixtec languages were spoken at Tilantongo and Zapotec at Monte Albán (in the Valley of Oaxaca). The linguistic situation of the Maya area is relatively clear – Proto-Yucatec and Proto-Cholan were established in their respective locations in Yucatán and in the Tabasco area. Around 200 CE speakers of the Tzeltalan branch of Proto-Cholan moved south into Chiapas displacing speakers of Zoquean languages. Throughout the southern part of the Maya area and the highlands the elite of the Classic Maya centers spoke a common prestige language based on Cholan, a variant often referred to as Classic Ch'olti'an.

An important question that remains to be answered is what language or languages were spoken by the people and rulers of the empire of Teotihuacan. During the first part of the Classic period Teotihuacan achieved dominance over central Mexico and far into the Maya area. Possible candidates for the language of Teotihuacan have been Nahuatl, Totonac or Mixe–Zoque. Terrence Kaufman has argued that Nahuatl is an unlikely candidate because Proto-Nahuan did not enter Mesoamerica until around the time of the fall of Teotihuacan (c. 600 AD), and that Totonac or Mixe–Zoque are likely candidates because many Mesoamerican languages have borrowed from these two languages during the Classic period. Others find Mixe–Zoque an unlikely candidate because no current Mixe–Zoque settlements are found in central Mexico. Around 500–600 CE a new language family entered Mesoamerica when speakers of Proto-Nahuan, a southern Uto-Aztecan language, moved south into central Mexico. Their arrival, which coincides with the decline of Teotihuacan and a period of general turmoil and mass migration in Mesoamerica, has led scientists to speculate that they might have been involved somehow in the fall of the Teotihuacan empire.

What is known is that in the years following Teotihuacan's fall Nahuan speakers quickly rose to power in central Mexico and expanded into areas earlier occupied by speakers of Oto-Manguean, Totonacan and Huastec. During this time Oto-Manguean groups of central Mexico such as the Chiapanec, Chorotega and Subtiaba migrated south some of them reaching the southern limits of Mesoamerica in El Salvador and Nicaragua. Also some speakers of Nahuan moved south, some settling on the coast of Oaxaca where their speech became the language Pochutec, and others moving all the way to El Salvador, becoming the ancestors of the speakers of modern Pipil.

==== Postclassic period (1000–1521 CE) ====
In the Postclassic period Nahuan languages diversified and spread, carried by the culture commonly known as Toltec. In the early Postclassic period feuds between royal lineages in the Yucatán Peninsula caused the forefathers of the Itza' to move south into the Guatemalan jungle. In northwestern Oaxaca speakers of Mixtec and Chocho-Popolocan languages built successful city-states, such as Teotitlan del Camino, which did not fall under Nahuan subjugation. Speakers of Otomian languages (Otomi, Mazahua and Matlatzinca) were routinely displaced to the edges of the Nahuan states. The Otomi of Xaltocan, for example, were forcibly relocated to Otumba by the early Aztec empire.

As Nahuatl, carried by the Toltec and later the Aztec culture, became a lingua franca throughout Mesoamerica even some Mayan states such as the Kʼicheʼ Kingdom of Qʼumarkaj adopted Nahuatl as a prestige language. In Oaxaca Zapotec and Mixtec peoples expanded their territories displacing speakers of the Tequistlatecan languages slightly. During this time the Purépecha (Tarascans) consolidated their state based at Tzintzuntzan. They were resistant to other states of Mesoamerica and had little contact with the rest of Mesoamerica. Probably as a result of their isolationist policy the Purépecha language is the only language of Mesoamerica to not show any of the traits associated with the Mesoamerican Linguistic Area. In Guerrero the Tlapanecs of Yopitzinco speaking the Oto-Manguean Tlapanec language remained independent of the Aztec empire as did some of the Oaxacan cultures such as the Mixtecs of Tututepec and the Zapotec of Zaachila. In the late postclassic around 1400 CE Zapotecs of Zaachila moved into the Isthmus of Tehuantepec creating a wedge of Zapotec speaking settlements between the former neighbors the Mixe and the Huave who were pushed into their current territories on the edges of the Isthmus.

=== Colonial period (1521–1821) ===
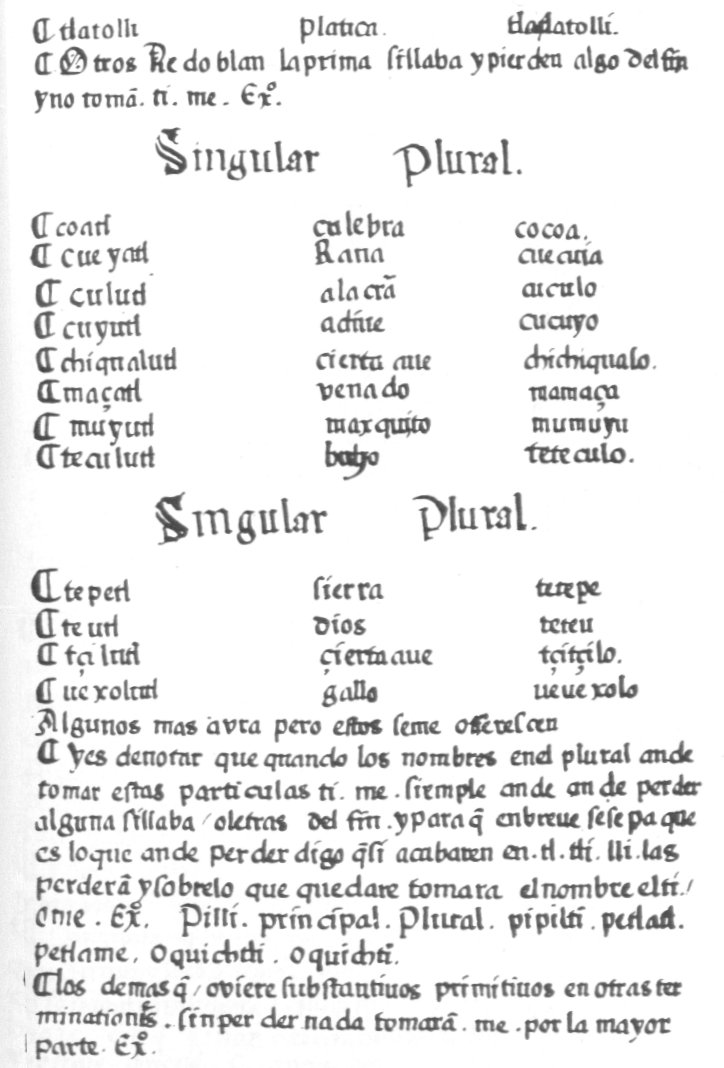
Page from Olmos' "Arte de la Lengua Mexicana", a grammar of the Nahuatl language published in 1547 three years earlier than the first Grammar of French

The Spanish arrival in the new world turned the linguistic situation of Mesoamerica upside down. And from then on the indigenous languages have been subject to varying policies imposed on them by the colonial rule. The first impact came from the decimation of the indigenous population by diseases brought by the Europeans. Within the first two centuries of Spanish rule Mesoamerica experienced a dramatic population decline and it is well documented that several small linguistic groups became completely extinct already during the 16th century. The policies that contributed most to a change in the linguistic situation of Mesoamerica were the policies used for conversion of Indians to Christianity. The first victim of this process was the native writing systems which were banned and prohibited and the existing texts destroyed – the pictorial scripts were seen as an idolatry by the Catholic Church. At first missionaries favoured the teaching of Spanish to their prospect converts but from 1555 the first Mexican Council established the policy that the Indians should be converted in their own languages and that parish priests should know the indigenous language of their parishioners. This called for a massive education of clergymen in native languages and the church undertook this task with great zeal. Institutions of learning such as the Colegio de Santa Cruz de Tlatelolco which was inaugurated in 1536 and which taught both indigenous and classical European languages to both Indians and priests were opened. And missionary grammarians undertook the job of writing grammars for the indigenous languages in order to teach priests. For example, the first grammar of Nahuatl, written by Andrés de Olmos, was published in 1547 – three years before the first grammar of French. During this time some literacy in indigenous languages written in the Latin script began to appear. In 1570 Philip II of Spain decreed that Nahuatl should become the official language of the colonies of New Spain in order to facilitate communication between the Spanish and natives of the colonies. Throughout the colonial period grammars of indigenous languages were composed, but strangely the quality of these were highest in the initial period and declined towards the ends of the 18th century. In practice the friars found that learning all the indigenous languages was impossible and they began to focus on Nahuatl. During this period the linguistic situation of Mesoamerica was relatively stable. However, in 1696 Charles II made a counter decree banning the use of any languages other than Spanish throughout the Spanish Empire. And in 1770 a decree with the avowed purpose of eliminating the indigenous languages was put forth by the Royal Cedula. This put an end to the teaching of and writing in indigenous languages and began a strict policy of hispanization of the Indians. However the fact that today around five million people in Mesoamerica still speak indigenous languages suggest that this policy wasn't as effective after all. The most important factor towards the decline of indigenous languages in this period has probably been the social marginalization of the native populations and their languages – and this process has been particularly effective during modern times.

=== Modern period (1821–) ===
In the modern period what has affected the indigenous languages most has been the pressure of social marginalization put on the indigenous populations by a growing mestizo class, a growing institutionalization of Hispanic society, and, in some cases, instances of violent suppression and mass murder against indigenous groups in a concerted effort as recorded in El Salvador in 1932. Indigenous languages have been seen by the governing classes as a hindrance to building homogeneous nation states and as an impediment to social progress. These viewpoints sparked a renewed interest in the hispanization of indigenous communities and the introduction of compulsory education in Spanish resulted in a great decline of indigenous languages throughout the 20th century. In a number of indigenous communities it has become practice to learn Spanish first and the indigenous language second. Parents have refrained from teaching their children their own language in order not to subject them to the social stigma of speaking an Indian language – and youths have learned their languages only when they came of age and started taking part in the adult society.

Within the last 20 years there has been an overt change in the policies of governments of Mesoamerican countries towards the indigenous languages. There has been official recognition of their right to existence and some kind of governmental support, to the point of recognizing them as national languages. Bilingual (rather than monolingual Spanish) education has been recognized as desirable even if not always actually achieved in practice. In Guatemala the recognition of the indigenous languages as official languages and a valuable part of the country's identity came after the Civil War which ended in 1996. In Mexico shifting governments had talked about the value of the country's indigenous heritage but it was not until 2003 that the Ley General de Derechos Lingüísticos de los Pueblos Indígenas established a framework for the conservation, nurturing and development of indigenous languages.

Despite these official changes, old attitudes persist in many spheres, and indigenous languages are not in any practical sense on a par with Spanish. At present the linguistic situation of Mesoamerican languages is most difficult in the Central American countries like Honduras, El Salvador and Nicaragua where indigenous languages still do not enjoy the rights or privileges now granted them elsewhere, and are still subject to social stigmatization.

== Map of current distribution ==
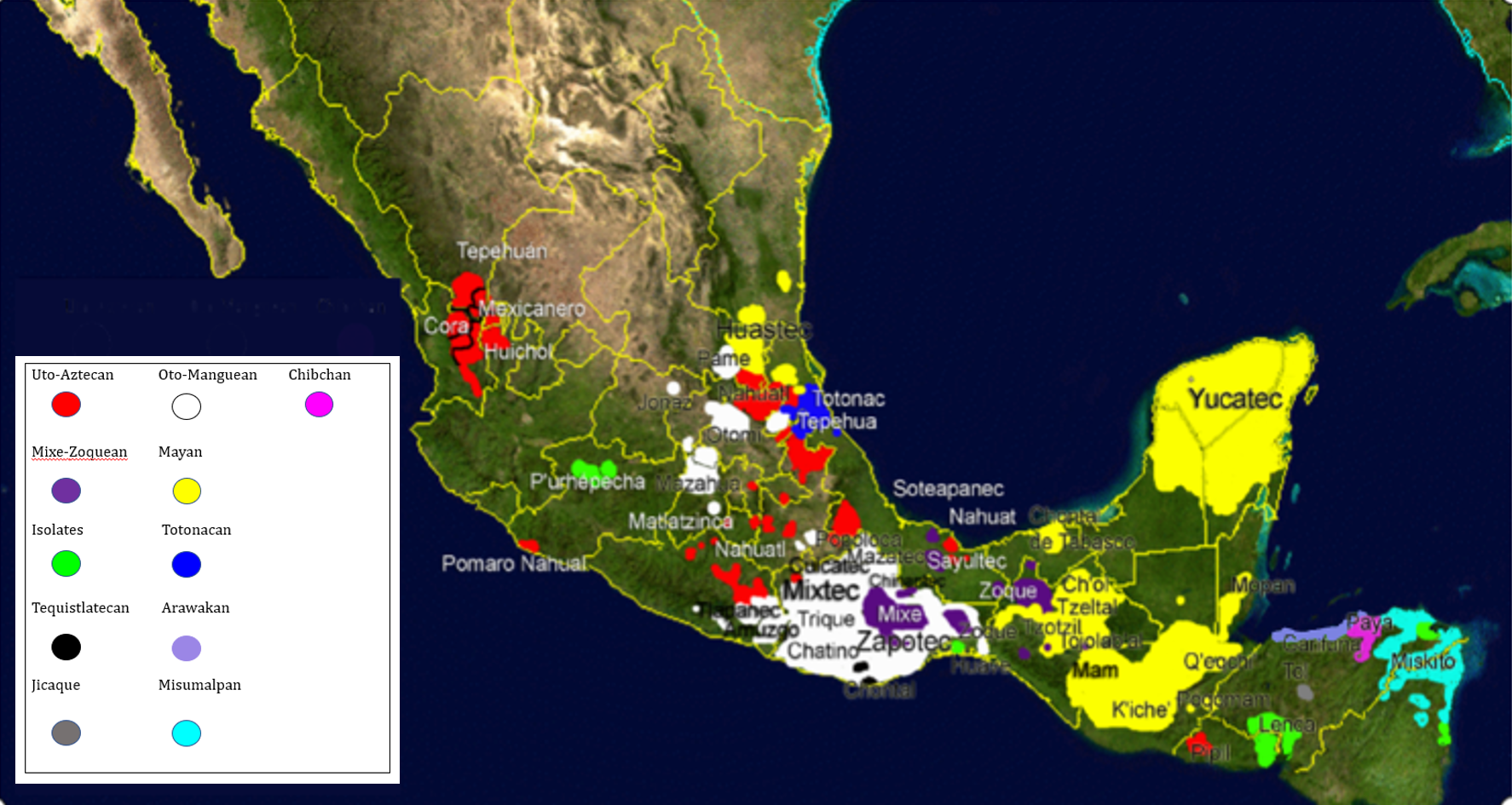
Mesoamerican languages geodistribution

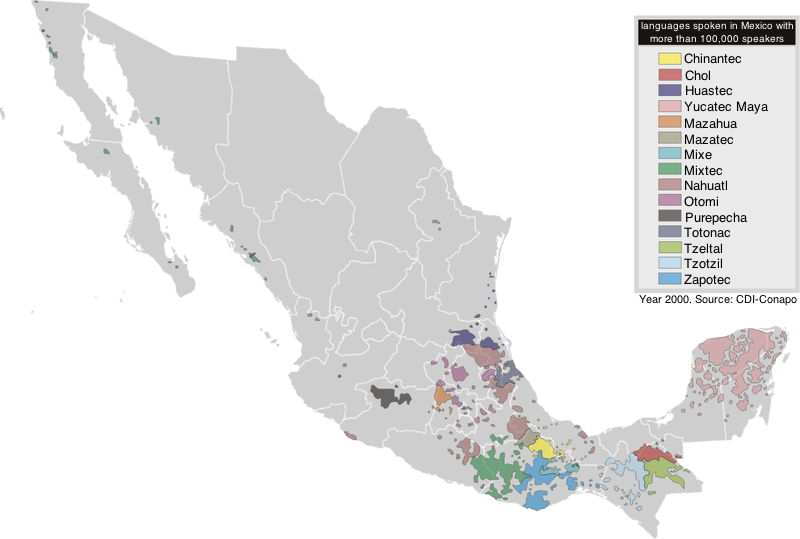
Language clusters of Mexico with more than 100,000 speakers

== Writing ==
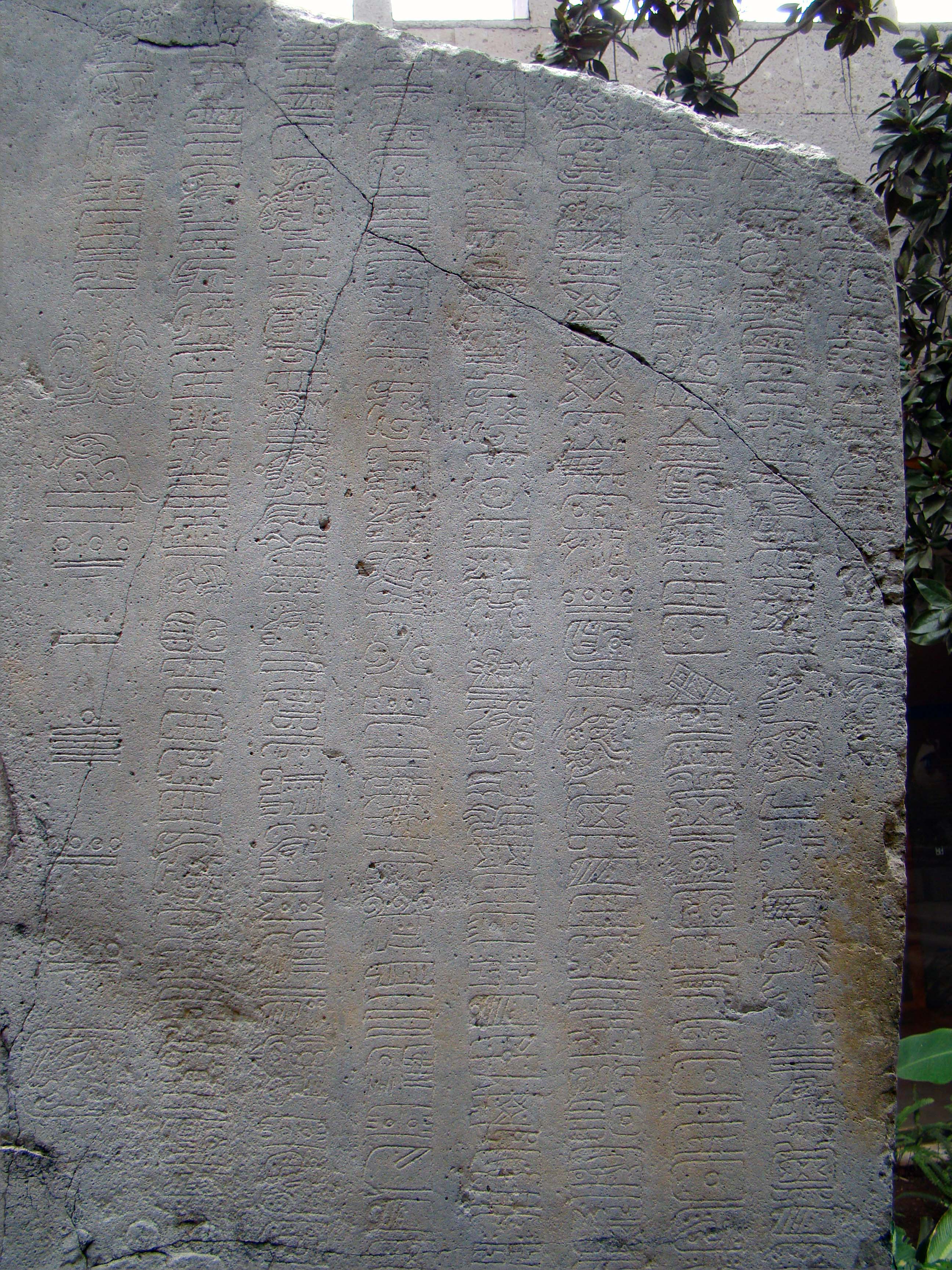
Detail showing glyphs from the Epi-Olmec script dating from the 2nd century CE La Mojarra Stela 1

Mesoamerica is one of the relatively few places in the world where writing has developed independently throughout history. The Mesoamerican scripts deciphered to date are logosyllabic combining the use of logograms with a syllabary, and they are often called hieroglyphic scripts. Five or six different scripts have been documented in Mesoamerica but archaeological dating methods make it difficult to establish which was earliest and hence the forebear from which the others developed. Candidates for being the first writing system of the Americas are Zapotec writing, the Isthmian or Epi-Olmec script or the scripts of the Izapan culture. The best documented and deciphered Mesoamerican writing system, and hence the most widely known, is the classic Maya script. Post-Classic cultures such as the Aztec and Mixtec cultures do not seem to have developed true writing systems, but instead used semasiographic writing although they did use phonetic principles in their writing by the use of the rebus principle. Aztec name glyphs for example do combine logographic elements with phonetic readings. From the colonial period on there exists an extensive Mesoamerican literature written in the Latin script.

== Literary traditions ==
The literature and texts created by indigenous Mesoamericans are the earliest and well known from the Americas for two primary reasons. First, the fact that native populations in Mesoamerica were the first to interact with Europeans assured the documentation and survival of literature samples in intelligible forms. Second, the long tradition of Mesoamerican writing contributed to them readily embracing the Latin script used by the Spanish and resulted in many literary works written in it during the first centuries after the Spanish conquest of Mexico. Some important literary works in Mesoamerican languages are: The mythological narrative of the Popol Vuh and the theatrical dance-drama the Rabinal Achí both written in Classical Kʼicheʼ Maya. The ethnographical work in the Florentine Codex and the songs of the Cantares Mexicanos both written in Classical Nahuatl. The prophetical and historical accounts of the books of Chilam Balam written in the Yucatec Maya language. As well as numerous smaller documents written in other indigenous languages throughout the colonial period. No true literary tradition for Mesoamerican languages of the modern period has yet emerged.

== Mesoamerican Linguistic Area ==
Throughout the millennia in which speakers of different Mesoamerican languages were engaged in contact the languages began to change and show similarities with one another. This has resulted in Mesoamerica evolving into a linguistic area of diffusion, a "Sprachbund", where most languages, even though they have different origins share some important linguistic traits. The traits defining the Mesoamerican sprachbund are few but well established: the languages use relational nouns to express spatial and other relations, they have a base 20 (Vigesimal) numeral system, their syntax is never verb-final and as a consequence of this they don't use switch reference, they use a distinct pattern for expressing nominal possession and they share a number of semantic calques]. Some other traits are less defining for the area, but still prevalent such as: the presence of whistled languages, incorporation of bodypart nouns into verbs, the derivation of locatives from bodypart nouns, grammatical indication of inalienable or intimate possession. Terrence Kaufman has worked with documenting the process of this linguistic convergence and he argues that the most probable donor languages of the borrowings into other Mesoamerican languages are the Mixe–Zoquean and Totonacan languages, this supports a theory of either or both of these cultures having a prominent role as a dominating power in early Mesoamerican history.

== Classification ==
=== Uto-Aztecan ===
(Other branches are outside Mesoamerica.)

- Corachol • Nayarit, Jalisco
  - Huichol • 20,000 native speakers
  - Cora • 15,000
- Aztecan
  - Nahuan • 1,380,000
    - Pochutec • Coast of Oaxaca • EXTINCT
    - General Aztec (Nahuatl)
      - Western periphery • Michoacán, Durango, Guerrero
      - Eastern periphery • S Veracruz, N Oaxaca, Tabasco
      - Huasteca • N Veracruz, Puebla, Hidalgo
      - Center • México (state), Morelos, Tlaxcala, Puebla, Hidalgo
    - Pipil • Pacific coast of Chiapas, Guatemala, El Salvador, Nicaragua

=== Oto-Manguean ===
- Otopamean
  - Otomian
    - Otomi • Hidalgo, Guanajuato, N México (state), Querétaro • 350,000
    - Mazahua • Michoacán, W México (state) • 150,000
  - Pamean
    - Chichimec • Guanajuato
    - Pame • San Luis Potosí, NW Hidalgo • 4200
    - Chichimeca Jonaz
  - Matlatzinca-Ocuilteco
    - Matlatzinca • SW México (state) • 3,000
    - Ocuilteco
- Chinantecan (perhaps closest to Otopamean)
  - Chinantec • N Oaxaca • 100,000
- Supanecan
  - Tlapanec (Yopi) • Guerrero • 44,000
  - Subtiaba • Nicaragua, El Salvador • EXTINCT
- Manguean (perhaps closest to Supanecan)
  - Chiapanec • Chiapas • EXTINCT
  - Chorotegan • Honduras • EXTINCT
  - Mangue • Nicaragua • EXTINCT
  - Nicoyan • Costa Rica • EXTINCT
- Popolocan
  - Mazatec • SE Puebla, N Oaxaca • 145,000
  - Ixcatec
  - Popoloca • SE Puebla, NW Oaxaca • 37,000
  - Chocho
- Zapotecan languages (perhaps closest to Popolocan)
  - Zapotec • Oaxaca • 500,000
  - Chatino • SW Oaxaca • 28,000
  - Soltec • Elotepec Oaxaca • EXTINCT
  - Papabuco • Elotepec Oaxaca • EXTINCT
- Mixtecan
  - Mixteco-Cuicateco
    - Mixtec • E Guerrero, S Puebla, W Oaxaca • 500,000
    - Cuicatec • NE Oaxaca • 20,000
  - Trique • W Oaxaca • 19,000
- Amuzgo (perhaps closest to Mixtecan)
  - Amuzgo language • E Guerrero, W Oaxaca • 20,000

=== Mixe–Zoquean ===
- Mixean
  - E & W Mixe • E Oaxaca • 75,000
  - Olutec& Sayultec • S Veracruz • EXTINCT?
  - Tapachultec • SE Chiapas • EXTINCT
- Zoquean
  - Zoque languages • Tabasco, Chiapas, E Oaxaca • 35,000
  - Sierra Popoluca & Texistepec Popoluca • S Veracruz • 25,000
  - Chimalapa

=== Totonacan ===
- Totonac • Puebla, Veracruz • 250,000
- Tepehua • Hidalgo, Veracruz • 10,000

=== Tequistlatecan (Chontal) ===
- Huamelultec (Lowland Oaxaca Chontal) • SE Oaxaca • 1000
- Tequistlatec • EXTINCT
- Highland Oaxaca Chontal • 3600

=== Mayan ===
- Huastecan
  - Huastec • N Veracruz, San Luis Potosí, NE Hidalgo • 120,000
  - Chicomuceltec • S Chiapas • EXTINCT
- Yucatecan
  - Yucatec • Yucatán, Campeche, Quintana Roo, Belize, N Guatemala • 750,000
  - Mopán • N Guatemala, Belize • 11,000
  - Itzá • N Guatemala • 36
  - Lacandón • Chiapas • 1000
- Western
  - Greater Tzeltalan
    - Cholan
      - Chol • Tabasco, Chiapas • 135,000
      - Chontal • Tabasco • 55,000
      - Chorti • Honduras, E Guatemala • 30,000
      - Cholti • Belize, E Guatemala • EXTINCT
    - Tzeltalan • Chiapas
      - Tzeltal • 215,000
      - Tzotzil • 265,000
  - Greater Kanjolabalan • NW Guatemala, Chiapas
    - Chujean
      - Chuj • NW Guatemala • 50,000
      - Tojolabal • Chiapas • 35,000
    - Kanjolabal (Q’anhob’al) • NW Guatemala
      - Solomec • 80,000
      - Acatec • 60,000
      - Jacaltec • 100,000
  - Mochó (Cotoque) • SE Chiapas
    - Motozintlec • EXTINCT?
    - Tuzantec • EXTINCT?
- Eastern
  - Greater Mamean
    - Mamean
      - Mam • W Guatemala • 535,000
      - Tektiteco • Chiapas-Guatemala border • 2300
    - Ixilan • NW Guatemala
      - Ixil • 70,000
      - Aguacatec (Awakateko) • 18,000
  - Greater Quichean
    - Quichean • C Guatemala
      - Quiché • 2,420,000
      - Cakchiquel • 450,000
      - Tz'utujil • 85,000
      - Sacapultec • 35,000
      - Sipacapan • 8000
    - Kekchi • C & E Guatemala • 420,000
    - Pocom • C & E Guatemala
      - Pocomchi • 90,000
      - Pocomam • 50,000
    - Uspantec • NW Guatemala • 3000

=== Xincan ===
- Chiquimulilla • SE Guatemala • EXTINCT
- Guazacapán • SE Guatemala • EXTINCT
- Jumaytepeque • SE Guatemala • EXTINCT
- Sinacantán • SE Guatemala • EXTINCT
- Yupiltepeque • SE Guatemala • EXTINCT

=== Lencan ===
- Kotik • SW Honduras, E El Salvador • EXTINCT
- Potón • E El Salvador • EXTINCT

=== Chibchan ===
(other branches are outside Mesoamerica)

- Pech • N Honduras • 1000

=== Misumalpan ===
- Miskito • Nicaragua • 185,000
- Sumo • 7000
- Cacaopera • E El Salvador • EXTINCT
- Matagalpa • Nicaragua • EXTINCT

== Isolates ==
- Purépecha • SW Michoacán • 120,000
- Cuitlatec • Guerrero • EXTINCT
- Huave (Wabe) • SE Oaxaca • 14,000

== Unclassified languages ==
- Alagüilac • Guatemala • EXTINCT
- Chontal of Guerrero • N Guerrero • EXTINCT
- Mazatec of Guerrero • N Guerrero • EXTINCT (see Ixcapuzalco#History)
- Tepuztec • S Guerrero • EXTINCT
- Chumbia • SW Guerrero • EXTINCT
- Otomi of Jalisco • S Jalisco • EXTINCT
- Zapotec of Jalisco • S Jalisco • EXTINCT

In the sixteenth century, multiple unclassified languages were also reported to have been spoken on the coastal regions of Guerrero, Michoacan and Jalisco.

== Proposed stocks ==
- Hokan
- Penutian
- Macro-Mayan
  - Mayan
  - Mixe–Zoque
  - Totonacan
  - Huave
- Macro-Chibchan
  - Chibchan
  - Misumalpan
  - Xinca
  - Lenca
- Tolatecan
  - Tequistlatecan
  - Jicaque
- Totozoquean
  - Mixe–Zoque
  - Totonacan
