= List of extinct languages of North America =

Language Endangerment Status by UNESCO Atlas of the World's Languages in Danger category

Extinct (EX)
- Extinct (EX): (lists)

Endangered
- Critically Endangered (CR); Severely Endangered (SE); Definitely Endangered (DE); Vulnerable (VU): (list); (list); (list); (list)

Safe
- Safe (NE): no list
- Other categories
- Revived (RE); Constructed (CL): (list); (list)
- Related topics: Atlas of the World's Languages in Danger; Endangered Languages Project; Ethnologue; Unclassified language; List of languages by total number of speakers
- UNESCO Atlas of the World's; Languages in Danger categories

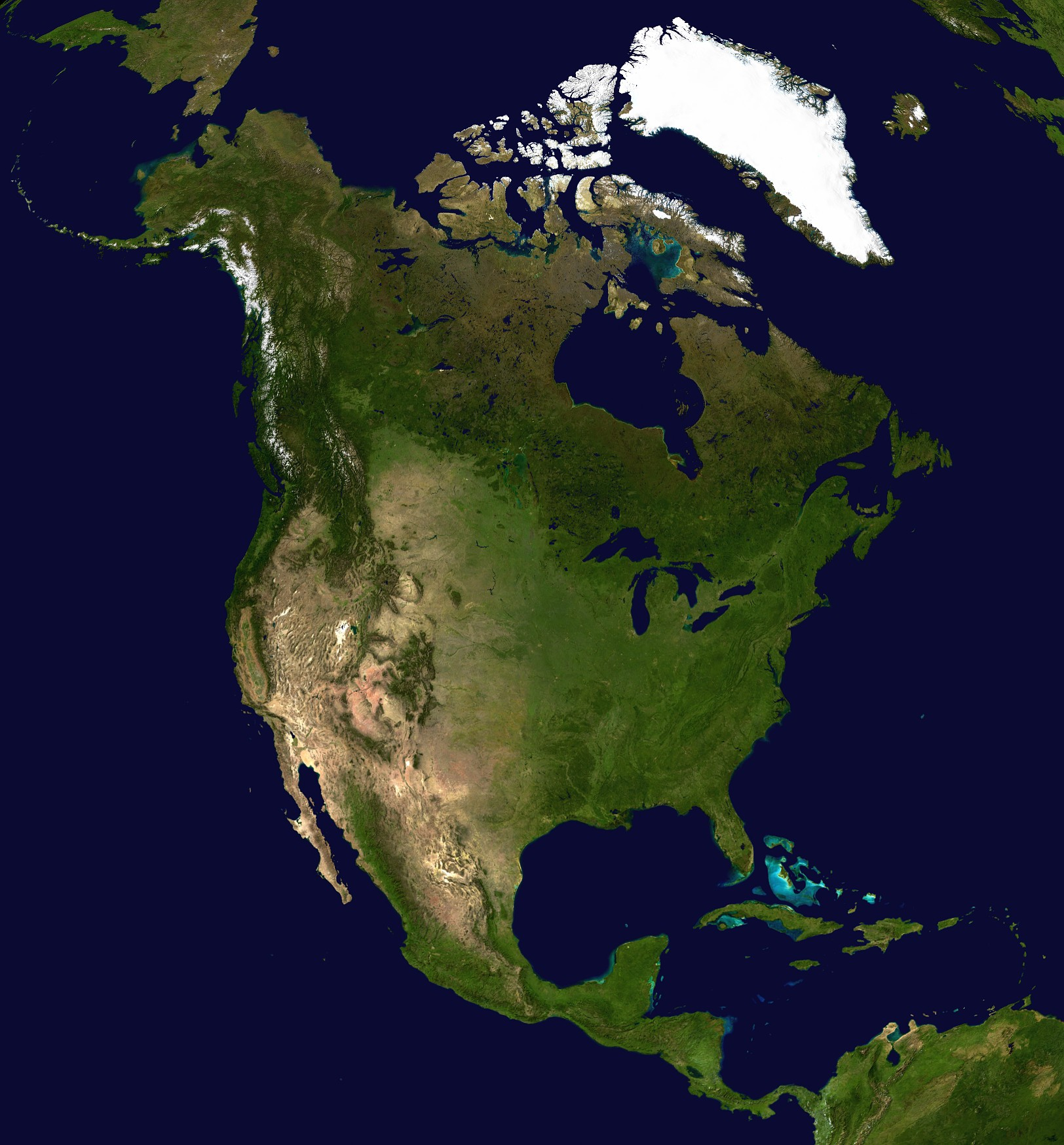

This article is a list of languages and dialects that have no native speakers, no spoken descendants, and that diverged from their parent language in North America. Most of these languages are languages of former Native American tribes.

There are 220 Indigenous, 2 Creole, 3 European, 5 Sign and 13 Pidgin languages listed. In total 243 languages.

== Canada ==
Indigenous languages

Language name	Language family	Extinction date	Notes	References
Beothuk	unclassified	6 June 1829		
Laurentian	Iroquoian	late 16th century		
Neutral Huron	Iroquoian	1671		
Nicola	Na-Dene	early 20th century		
Pentlatch	Salishan	1940	Revival attempts underway	
Petun	Iroquoian	17th century		
Tagish	Na-Dene	2008		
Southern Tsimshian	Tsimshianic	2013	Revival attempts underway	

European language dialects

Language or dialect name	Dialect parent language	Language family	Extinction date	Notes	References
Newfoundland Irish	Irish	Indo-European	20th century		

Pidgin languages

Language name	Pidgin parent language(s)	Extinction date	Notes	References
Algonquian–Basque pidgin	Basque, Algonquian	approx. 1711		
Haida Jargon	Haida	1830s		
Inuktitut-English Pidgin	Inuktitut, English	1960s		
Labrador Inuit Pidgin French	French, Inuktitut	18th century		
Nootka Jargon	Nuu-chah-nulth	(date missing)		
Slavey Jargon	Slavey, French	19th century		

== Caribbean ==
Indigenous languages

Language name	Language family	Extinction date	Locations	References
Caquetio	Arawakan	1862	ABC islands (Leeward Antilles)	
Ciguayo	unclassified	16th century	Hispaniola	
Guanahatabey	unclassified	16th century	Cuba	
Kalinago/Island Carib/Iñeri	Arawakan	1920s	Windward Islands (Guadeloupe to Grenada, except Barbados)	
Macorix	unclassified	16th century	Hispaniola	
Shebayo	Arawakan	attested 17th century	Trinidad	
Taíno	Arawakan	17th century	Widespread throughout Caribbean	
Yao	Cariban	17th century	Trinidad, French Guiana	

== Central America ==
Indigenous languages

Language name	Language family	Extinction date	Locations	References
Alagüilac	unclassified	before 16th century	Guatemala	
Cacaopera	Misumalpan	20th century	El Salvador	
Chiquimulilla	Xincan	1996	Guatemala	
Chʼoltiʼ	Mayan	late 18th century	Guatemala, Belize	
Corobicí	Chibchan	(date missing)	Costa Rica	
Cueva	unclassified (Choco?)	by 1535	Panama	
Dorasque	Chibchan	(date missing)	Panama	
Huetar	Chibchan	17th century	Costa Rica	
Guazacapán	Xincan	1997	Guatemala	
Jumaytepeque	Xincan	1997	Guatemala	
Honduran Lenca	Lencan	20th century	Honduras, El Salvador	
Mangue/Chorotega	Oto-Manguean	19th century	Nicaragua, Honduras, and Costa Rica	
Matagalpa	Misumalpan	1997	Nicaragua	
Sinacantán	Xincan	20th century	Guatemala	
Subtiaba	Oto-Manguean	20th century	Nicaragua	
Voto	Chibchan	(date missing)	Costa Rica	
Western Jicaque	Jicaquean	late 19th centuery	Honduras	
Yupiltepeque	Xincan	1920s	Guatemala	

=== Sign languages ===
Language name	Extinction date	References
Bribri Sign Language	by 1991	

== Greenland ==
European language dialects

Language name	Language family	Extinction date	Notes	References
Greenlandic Norse	North Germanic	late 15th or early 16th century		

Pidgin languages

Language name	Pidgin parent language(s)	Extinction date	Notes	References
West Greenlandic Pidgin	Greenlandic	19th century		

== Mexico ==
Indigenous languages

Language or dialect name	Dialect parent language	Language family	Extinction date	Notes	References
Acaxee		Uto-Aztecan	17–18th century		
Cabil		Mayan	(date missing)	May be Chicomuceltec	
Cazcan/Caxcan/Kaskán		Uto-Aztecan	16th or 17th century		
Chiapanec		Oto-Manguean	20th century		
Chicomuceltec		Mayan	1970s or 1980s		
Chontal of Guerrero		unclassified	After 1687		
Chumbia		unclassified	(date missing)		
Coca		Uto-Aztecan	(date missing)		
Cochimí		Yuman–Cochimí	early 20th century		
Comecrudo		Comecrudan	19th century		
Cuitlatec/Cuitlateco		Language isolate	1960s		
Classical Náhuatl	Nahuatl	Uto-Aztecan	late 16th century	used as the lingua franca of the Aztec Empire until its collapse	
Eudeve		Uto-Aztecan	1930s		
Guachichil		Uto-Aztecan	17th century		
Mamulique		Comecrudan	19th century		
Maratino		unclassified	(date missing)		
Monqui		unclassified	(date missing)		
Naolan		unclassified	1950s		
Otomi (Jalisco)		unclassified	(date missing)		
Quinigua		unclassified	(date missing)		
Southern Pame	Pame	Oto-Manguean	mid 20th century		
Pericú		unclassified	before 1800		
Pochutec		Uto-Aztecan	20th century		
Solteco Zapotec	Zapotec	Oto-Manguean	19th century		
Tapachultec		Mixe–Zoque	1930s		
Teojomulco Chatino	Chatino	Oto-Manguean	early 20th century		
Tepecano		Uto-Aztecan	20th century		
Tequistlatec		Tequistlatecan	(date missing)		
Tubar		Uto-Aztecan	20th century		
Waikuri		unclassified	before 1800		
Xixime		Uto-Aztecan	17–18th century		
Zacateco		Uto-Aztecan	(date missing)		
Zapotec (Jalisco)		unclassified	(date missing)		

== United States ==
=== Indigenous languages ===
Language or dialect name	Language family	Extinction date	Notes	References
Achumawi	Palaihnihan	2013	Revival attempts underway	
Adai	unclassified	19th century		
Ais	unclassified	18th century		
Carolina Algonquian/Pamlico/Croatoan	Algic	1790s		
Alsea/Yaquina	Language isolate	1942	Alsea and Yaquina are thought to be either two related languages or two dialects of the same language	
Apalachee	Muskogean	18th century	Revival attempts underway	
Aranama	unclassified	19th century		
Atakapa	Language isolate	20th century		
Atsina/Gros Ventre	Algic	2007	Revival attempts underway	
Atsugewi	Palaihnihan	1988		
Awaswas	Utian	19th century	formerly known as "Santa Cruz"	
Barbareño/Šmuwič	Chumashan	1965	Revival attempts underway. Barbareño and Ineseño may be related dialects of the same language or closely related languages	
Bidai	unclassified	19th century		
Biloxi	Siouan	1930s		
Caddo/Hasí꞉nay	Caddoan	14 July 2025	Revival attempts underway	
Cahto/Kato	Na-Dene	1960s		
Calusa	unclassified	19th century		
Catawba	Siouan	1959	Revival attempts underway	
Cayuse	Language isolate	1930s		
Chalon	Utian	19th century		
Upper Chehalis	Salishan	2001	Revival attempts underway	
Lower Chehalis	Salishan	1990s		
Chemakum/Chimakum/Chimacum	Chimakuan	19th century		
Chico/Valley Maidu	Maiduan	21st century		
Chimariko	Language isolate	1950s		
Chitimacha/Sitimaxa	Language isolate	1940	Revival attempts underway	
Chiwere/Iowa-Otoe-Missouria/Báxoje-Jíwere-Ñút'achi	Siouan	1996	Revival attempts underway	
Chochenyo	Utian	1934	Revival attempts underway	
Coahuilteco	Language isolate	18th century		
Columbia-Moses	Salishan	2 May 2023	Revival attempts underway	
Cowlitz	Salishan	20th century	Revival attempts underway	
Cupeño	Uto-Aztecan	1987		
Esselen	Language isolate	19th century		
Erie	Iroquoian	17th century		
Etchemin	Algic	17th century		
Eyak	Na-Dene	2008	Revival attempts underway	
Galice/Galice-Applegate/Upper Rogue River	Na-Dene	1963		
Halchidhoma/Xalychidom	Yuman–Cochimí	(date missing)		
Hanis/Coos	Coosan	1972		
Holikachuk	Na-Dene	2012		
Houma	Muskogean	after 1907	Revival attempts underway	
Hupa	Na-Dene	7 March 2026		
Ineseño/Sʰamala	Chumashan	1965	Revival attempts underway. Barbareño and Ineseño may be related dialects of the same language or closely related languages	
Island Chumash/Isleño/Cruzeño	Chumashan	1915		
Central Kalapuya	Kalapuyan	1954		
Kansa	Siouan	1982		
Karankawa	unclassified	1858		
Karkin	Utian	1950s		
Kathlamet	Chinookan	1930s		
Kiksht/Upper Chinook/Columbia Chinook/Wasco-Wishram	Chinookan	2012		
Kitanemuk	Uto-Aztecan	1940s		
Kitsai	Caddoan	1940		
Klallam/Clallam/Ns'Klallam/S'klallam	Salishan	2014	Revival attempts underway	
Klamath/Klamath–Modoc/Lutuamian	Plateau Penutian	2003	Revival attempts underway	
Konomihu	Shastan	1940s		
Kwalhioqua-Clatskanie	Na-Dene	20th century		
Loup	Algic	18th century	May have been 5 different languages	
Lower Chinook	Chinookan	1930s		
Luiseño	Uto-Aztecan	2010s		
Lushootseed	Salishan	2008	Revival attempts underway	
Maidu	Maiduan	2007	Revival attempts underway	
Makah	Wakashan	2002	Revival attempts underway	
Mandan	Siouan	2016	Revival attempts underway	
Massachusett/Natick/Wôpanâak/Pokanoket/Nonantum/Indian	Algic	19th century	Revival attempts underway. As of 2014, 5 children are native speakers, 15 are proficient second-language speakers and 500 are adult second-language learners.	
Mattole/Mattole-Bear River	Na-Dene	1930s		
Miami-Illinois	Algic	20th century	Revival attempts underway	
Miluk/ Lower Coquille	Coosan	1939		
Mitchigamea	Siouan	18th century		
Bay Miwok	Utian	(date missing)		
Coast Miwok	Utian	1970		
Lake Miwok	Utian	1990s		
Northern Sierra Miwok	Utian	1990s		
Plains Miwok	Utian	1990s		
Mohican/Mahican	Algic	1940s	Revival attempts underway	
Mohegan-Pequot/Mohegan-Pequot-Montauk/Secatogue/Shinnecock-Poosepatuck	Algic	1908	Revival attempts underway	
Molala	Plateau Penutian	1958		
Mutsun	Utian	1930	Revival attempts underway	
Nanticoke/Piscataway	Algic	1840s	Revival attempts underway. Nanticoke and Piscataway may be related dialects of the same language or closely related languages	
Nansemond	unclassified	before 20th century	May have been Algic	
Narragansett	Algic	18th–19th century		
Natchez	Language isolate	1957	Revival attempts underway	
Nawathinehena	Algic	19th century		
Nicoleño	Uto-Aztecan	1853		
Nisenan	Maiduan	2000s	Revival attempts underway	
Nooksack	Salishan	1988	Revival attempts underway	
Nomlaki	Wintuan	20th century		
Northern Kalapuyan	Kalapuyan	1937		
Nottoway/Cheroenhaka	Iroquoian	1838	Revival attempts underway	
Obispeño/tiłhini	Chumashan	1917		
Ofo	Siouan	20th century		
Okwanuchu	Shastan	20th century		
Osage	Siouan	3 November 2005	As of 2009, 15–20 2L speakers and ongoing revival	
Pamunkey	unclassified	before 20th century	May have been Algic	
Piro Pueblo	Tanoan	1900		
Plains Apache	Na-Dene	2008		
Lipan Apache	Na-Dene	early 21st century	Presumely	
Central Pomo	Pomoan	before 2000		
Eastern Pomo/Clear Lake Pomo	Pomoan	2007	Revival attempts underway	
Northern Pomo	Pomoan	2005	Revival attempts underway	
Northeastern Pomo	Pomoan	1961		
Southern Pomo	Pomoan	2014	Revival attempts underway	
Powhatan	Algic	18th century		
Purisimeño	Chumashan	early 20th century		
Quapaw	Siouan	19 April 2022		
Quileute	Chimakuan	1999		
Quinault	Salishan	1996	Revival attempts underway	
Quiripi/Mattabesic/Quiripi-Unquachog/Quiripi-Naugatuck/Wampano	Algic	20th century		
Ramaytush	Utian	1915		
Rumsen/Rumsien/San Carlos Costanoan/Carmeleno	Utian	1939		
Salinan	Language isolate	1958		
Scahentoarrhonon	Iroquoian	approx. 1652		
Serrano	Uto-Aztecan	2002	Revival attempts underway	
Shasta	Shastan	20th century		
New River Shasta	Shastan	1926		
Siuslaw	Language isolate	1960		
Southern Patwin	Wintuan	(date missing)		
Susquehannock/Conestoga	Iroquoian	18th century		
Taensa	Language isolate	late 19th century	Probably Natchez dialect.	
Takelma	Language isolate	1934		
Tamien	Utian	(date missing)		
Tataviam	Uto-Aztecan	1916		
Tawasa	Language isolate	18th century	Possibly Timucuan dialect.	
Tillamook	Salishan	1972		
Timucua	Language isolate	18th century		
Tongva/Gabrielino/Gabrieleño	Uto-Aztecan	20th century	Revival attempts underway	
Tonkawa	Language isolate	1940s		
Tübatulabal	Uto-Aztecan	2008	Revival attempts underway	
Tunica/Luhchi Yoroni/Tonica/Yuron	Language isolate	1948	Revival attempts underway	
Tuscarora	Iroquoian	2020		
Tutelo/Tutelo–Saponi	Siouan	1982		
Tututni/(Lower) Rogue River/Upper Coquille/Nuu-wee-ya	Na-Dene	1983	Revival attempts underway	
Twana/Skokomish	Salishan	1980		
Upper Umpqua	Na-Dene	1950s		
Unami	Algic	2002		
Ventureño/Mitsqanaqa'n	Chumashan	20th century		
Wailaki/Eel River Athabaskan	Na-Dene	1960s		
Wappo	Yuki–Wappo	1990		
Wenro	Iroquoian	17th century		
Wichita	Caddoan	2016		
Wintu	Wintuan	2003	Revival attempts underway	
Wiyot/Wishosk/Soulatluk	Algic	1962	Revival attempts underway	
Woccon	Siouan	early 18th century	Revival attempts underway	
Yana/Yanan	Language isolate	1916		
Yoncalla/Southern Kalapuya/Yonkalla	Kalapuyan	1930s		
Yuchi	Language isolate	August 27, 2021	Revival attempts underway	
Yuki/Ukomno'm	Yuki–Wappo	1983		
Yurok/Chillula/Mita/Pekwan/Rikwa/Sugon/Weitspek/Weitspekan	Algic	2013	Revival attempts underway	

=== European languages or dialects ===
Language name	Language family	Extinction date	References
Jersey Dutch	Indo-European	20th century	

=== Creole languages or dialects ===
Language name	Creole parent language(s)	Extinction date	References
Mohawk Dutch	Dutch creole and Mohawk	19–20th century	

=== Pidgin languages ===
Language name	Pidgin parent language(s)	Extinction date	References
Broken Oghibbeway	Ottawa Ojibwe and Fox	after 1820s	
Pidgin Delaware	Delaware	19th century	
Massachusett Pidgin	Massachusett	early 18th century	
Massachusett Pidgin English	English and Massachusett	early 19th century	
Mobilian Jargon	Muskogean	1950s	

=== Sign languages ===
Language name	Extinction date	References
Henniker Sign Language	20th century	
Martha's Vineyard Sign Language	1952	
Plateau Sign Language	18th century	
Sandy River Valley Sign Language	19th century	

=== U.S. Virgin Islands ===
Creole languages

Language name	Creole parent language(s)	Extinction date	References
Negerhollands	Dutch creole, Danish, English, French, Spanish, and African	1987	

== United States and Canada ==
Indigenous languages

Language or dialect name	Dialect parent language	Language family	Extinction date	Notes	References
Eastern Abenaki	Abenaki language	Algic	1993		
Wyandot		Iroquoian	1972	Revival attempts underway by the Wyandotte Nation (United States) and Huron-Wendat Nation (Canada)	
Tsetsaut		Na-Dene	early 1930s		

Pidgin languages

Language name	Pidgin parent language(s)	Extinction date	Notes	References
Eskimo Trade Jargon	Iñupiaq	20th century		

== United States and Mexico ==
Indigenous languages

Language or dialect name	Language family	Extinction date	Notes	References
Amotomanco	unclassified	(date missing)		
Cotoname	Language isolate	20th century		
Garza	Comecrudan	19th century		
Ópata	Uto-Aztecan	20th century	Revival attempts underway among Opata people	
Solano	unclassified	18th century		

== See also ==
- List of extinct Uto-Aztecan languages
- List of extinct languages of South America
- Extinct languages of the Marañón River basin
- List of extinct languages of Central America and the Caribbean
