= List of extinct languages of Central America and the Caribbean =

Language Endangerment Status by UNESCO Atlas of the World's Languages in Danger category

Extinct (EX)
- Extinct (EX): (lists)

Endangered
- Critically Endangered (CR); Severely Endangered (SE); Definitely Endangered (DE); Vulnerable (VU): (list); (list); (list); (list)

Safe
- Safe (NE): no list
- Other categories
- Revived (RE); Constructed (CL): (list); (list)
- Related topics: Atlas of the World's Languages in Danger; Endangered Languages Project; Ethnologue; Unclassified language; List of languages by total number of speakers
- UNESCO Atlas of the World's; Languages in Danger categories

This is a list of extinct languages of Central America and the Caribbean, languages which have undergone language death, have no native speakers, and no spoken descendants.

There are 28 languages listed, 20 lost in Central America and 8 lost in the Caribbean.

== Central America ==
Language name	Language family	Extinction date	Locations	References
Alagüilac	unclassified	before 16th century	Guatemala	
Cacaopera	Misumalpan	20th century	El Salvador	
Chicomuceltec	Mayan	1970s or 1980s	Guatemala, Mexico	
Chiquimulilla	Xincan	1996	Guatemala	
Chʼoltiʼ	Mayan	late 18th century	Guatemala, Belize	
Corobicí	Chibchan	(date missing)	Costa Rica	
Cueva language	unclassified	1535	Panama	
Dorasque	Chibchan	(date missing)	Panama	
Huetar	Chibchan	17th century	Costa Rica	
Guazacapán	Xincan	1997	Guatemala	
Jumaytepeque	Xincan	1997	Guatemala	
Lenca	Lencan languages	20th century	Honduras, El Salvador	
Mangue/Chorotega	Oto-Manguean	19th century	Nicaragua, Honduras, and Costa Rica	
Matagalpa	Misumalpan	1997	Nicaragua	
Sinacantán	Xincan	20th century	Guatemala	
Subtiaba	Oto-Manguean	20th century	Nicaragua	
Voto	Chibchan	(date missing)	Costa Rica	
Western Jicaque	Jicaquean	late 19th centuery	Honduras	
Yupiltepeque	Xincan	1920s	Guatemala	

=== Sign languages ===
Language name	Extinction date	References
Bribri Sign Language	by 1991	

== The Caribbean ==
Language name	Language family	Extinction date	Locations	References
Caquetio	Arawakan	1862	ABC islands (Leeward Antilles)	
Ciguayo	unclassified	16th century	Hispaniola	
Guanahatabey	unclassified	16th century	Cuba	
Kalinago/Island Carib	Arawakan	1920s	Windward Islands (Guadeloupe to Grenada, except Barbados)	
Macorix	unclassified	16th century	Hispaniola	
Shebayo	Arawakan	19th century	Trinidad	
Taino	Arawakan	19th century	Widespread throughout Caribbean	
Yaio	Cariban	17th century	Trinidad, French Guiana	
