= Languages of El Salvador =

- Dialect zones of El Salvador
- Official: Spanish
- Indigenous: Nawat, Qʼeqchiʼ (†), Chʼortiʼ (†), Lenca †, Cacaopera †, Xincan †, Mangue †
- Vernacular: Salvadoran Spanish
- Foreign: English, Italian, Arabic, Turkish, Portuguese, German, French, Japanese, Mandarin Chinese, Korean
- Signed: Salvadoran Sign Language
- Keyboard layout: Hispanic American QWERTY

The Languages of El Salvador is what the country has been influenced throughout its history from the roots of the indigenous languages. Spanish is the official language of El Salvador, plus the indigenous as recognized languages:

El idioma oficial de El Salvador es el castellano. El gobierno está obligado a velar por su conservación y enseñanza. Las lenguas autóctonas que se hablan en el territorio nacional forman parte del patrimonio cultural y serán objeto de preservación, difusión y respeto.

The official language of El Salvador is Castilian. The government is required to ensure its conservation and teaching. The indigenous languages spoken in the national territory are part of the cultural heritage and will be preserved, disseminated and respected.

— Article 62 from the Constitution of El Salvador of 1983

There are also foreign languages that came from immigrants of the world and its descendants such as English, French, Italian, among others.

== Indigenous languages ==
Map of El Salvador's Indigenous Peoples at the time of the Spanish conquest: 1. Pipil people, 2. Lenca, 3. Cacaopera, 4. Xinca, 5. Maya Ch'orti' people, 6. Maya Poqomam people, 7. Mangue (Chorotega).

Before colonization, El Salvador had seven indigenous languages, most of which have become extinct:

=== Endangered languages ===
- Nawat is spoken by the Pipil, considered the most widely spoken indigenous language in the country, with more than a thousand speakers.

=== Extinct languages ===
- Cacaopera (†) was spoken in the department of Morazán.
- Mayans spoke Poqomam in the west of the Santa Ana Department; and Chʼortiʼ, which was the main language of the Chalatenango Department and northern Santa Ana, before being conquered by the Spanish in the mid-1530s. Both languages are spoken in Guatemala.
- The Xinca group (†), was located in the west of the Ahuachapán Department, being more widespread in adjoining areas of Guatemala.
- Mangue (†) was located in the east of the La Unión Department.
- Potón (†) was spoken by the Lenca, located in the eastern part of the country.

== Spanish ==
Spanish is the most widely spoken language for historical reasons of European colonialization, which is present as the official language since the Constitution of 1962. The last revision was the Constitution of the Republic of 1983, which is indicated in Article 62 of the Third Section, Chapter II. This Central American dialect certainly has the Yeísmo in its allophones and the seseo like any other Spanish American country; its form of respect for the second person represents the voseo, although the tuteo is preserved alternatively and the term usted as a formal treatment.

== Sign Languages ==
The Salvadoran Sign Language (SSL), has been officially recognized since 2005 and has various Salvadoran associations for the deaf culture mixed with American Sign Language (ASL). Among them are the Salvadoran Association of the Deaf, the Association for the Integral Development of the Salvadoran Deaf Community (ASDICSSA) and the Pro Education Foundation of El Salvador (FUNPRES).

== Foreign Languages ==
El Salvador has approximately 7% of the population who speak foreign languages by the foreign communities of the country mentioned by some of these.

- English is the language spoken by almost half of El Salvadors population academically, economically and socially, ranked as the fiftieth in the world with a moderate score of 524.
- French is present in its community for migration situations based on their stories, their education, and their economy.
- Italian is where its cultural influence was marked from the 19th Century that has its speaking community.

== See also ==
- Academia Salvadoreña de la Lengua (in Spanish)
