= Cacaopera (disambiguation) =

Cacaopera is a municipality in the Morazán department of El Salvador.

Cacaopera may also refer to:

- Cacaopera people, an indigenous people in El Salvador
- Cacaopera language, an extinct indigenous language in El Salvador
