= Alaguilac =

Alaguilac may refer to:

- Alaguilac people, a historic ethnic group of Central America
- Alaguilac language, their language
