= Pegative case =

Grammatical case

In linguistics, the pegative case (abbreviated PEG) is a hypothetical grammatical case that prototypically marks the agent of an action of giving.

The case has been posited by Danish linguist Søren Wichmann for the Azoyú variety of the Tlapanec language, which seems to be the only natural language to use such a case. Wichmann writes that he has:

... based 'Pegative' on the Greek πηγή, which means 'origin, source, emanation, etc.' to provide a name for a case that proto-typically refers to a giver as opposed to a recipient.

However, the posited Tlapanec case system is verbal, and it is controversial whether verbal case as such actually exists.
