= Tlapanec =

Tlapanec, Tlappanec, Tlapaneco or Meꞌphaa may refer to:

- Tlapanec people, an indigenous people of Mexico
- Tlapanec language, an indigenous Mesoamerican language
