= Macro-Chibchan languages =

Native American proposed language family

Macro-Chibchan
- Lenmichí
- (controversial)
- Geographic distribution: Central America and Colombia
- Linguistic classification: Proposed language family
- Subdivisions: Chibchan; Misumalpan; Lencan †

Language codes
- Glottolog: None
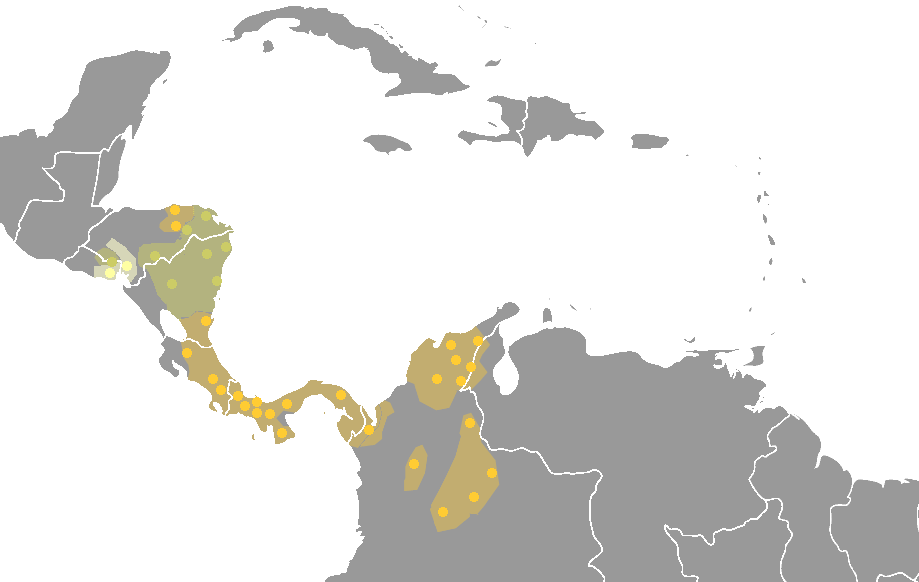
- The Chibchan, Misumalpan, and Lencan languages

Macro-Chibchan is a proposed grouping of the languages of the Lencan, Misumalpan, and Chibchan families into a single large phylum (macrofamily).

== History ==
The Lencan and Misumalpan languages were once included in the Chibchan family proper, but were excluded pending further evidence as that family became well established. Kaufman (1990) finds the Chibchan–Misumalpan connection convincing, if as yet unsubstantiated, though Campbell (1997) finds it doubtful. The Xincan family was once included in Macro-Chibchan, but this is now doubtful.

Constenla (2005) calls this proposed phylum Lenmichí (Lencan–Misumalpan–Chibchan) and provides 85 cognate sets which exhibit regular sound correspondences among the three families. He suggests that Chocoan may be related as well.

Greenberg proposed a broader conception of Macro-Chibchan, one dismissed by linguists working on the families in question. It included Yanomam, Purépecha, and Cuitlatec in addition to Chibchan–Misumalpan–Xinca–Lenca. Greenberg (1987) included Paezan languages in a Chibchan-Paezan stock with Barbacoan, Chibchan, Chocoan, Jirajaran, and the isolates Betoi, Kamsá (Sibundoy), Yaruro, Esmeraldeño, Mochica, Cunza, Itonama, Timucua and Yurumanguí.

An automated computational analysis (ASJP 4) by Müller et al. (2013) also found lexical similarities between Chibchan and Misumalpan. However, since the analysis was automatically generated, the grouping could be either due to mutual lexical borrowing or genetic inheritance.

== Reconstruction ==
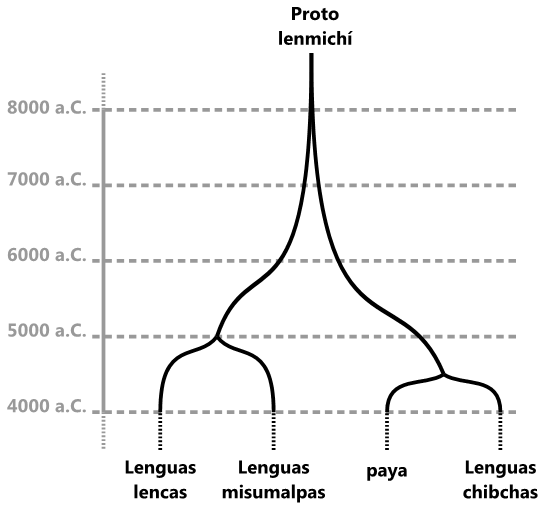
Phylogenetic tree for Macro-Chibchan (Lenmichian) languages.

Constenla (2005) reconstructed five vowels and eleven consonants for Proto-Lenmichian, with the following reflexes:

=== Vowels ===
Proto-Lenmichian	*a	*e	*i	*o	*u
Proto-Chibchan	*a	*e	*i	*o	*u
Proto-Lencan	*a *e	*e	*i	*o *u	*u
Proto-Misumalpan	*a	*i	*i	*u	*u

There are also a series of nasal vowels.

=== Consonants ===
Proto-Lenmichian	*b	*d	*t	*k	*ʔ	*ts	*s	*h	*l	*ɾ	*w
Proto-Chibchan	*b	*d	*t	*k	*ʔ	*ts	*s	*h	*ɾ		∅
Proto-Lencan	*p *m	*l *n	*t	*k	∅	*ts'		∅	*l		*w
Proto-Misumalpan	*b *p *m	*d *n	*t	*k	∅	*s		∅	*l	*ɾ	*w

== Vocabulary ==
Below is a comparison of selected basic vocabulary items.

gloss	Xinca (Guazacapán)	Lenca (Chilanga)	Proto-Lencan	Proto-Misumalpan	Proto-Chibchan
head	húš̱i	oso			
hair	múti	alah	*asak		*ʦa
eye	hurayí	sap			*uᵐba
ear	mánka	tokoro		*tupal	
nose	narí	nepkuru	*nep	*nam	*ⁿdii(k)
tooth	rajáj (Chiquimulilla)	neh	*nek		*ⁿduʔ
tongue	elahá	Nepal		*tu	*kuʔ(-Ba)
mouth	š̱ahá	iɴ-ts’ats’a	*in	*ta	*kah-ka
hand	pu	koʃaka			*kuuʔ; *haⁿd- ~ *hat-
foot	wapilí	waʃaka			*kihʦa ~ *kihsa
breast	šéke	ts’ukiɴ 'nipple'			*kãʔ; *ʦuʔ
meat	uwí	waʃa			*ᵑgaʔⁿda ~ *ᵑgaʔta; *sih
blood	káma	ala		*a	*hapi ~ *apiʔ
bone	hararí	ʃila-ts’e	*ts’ek		*kãⁿd-, *ⁿdaⁿdi ~ *ⁿdaiⁿd- / *saⁿdi ~ *saiⁿd-
person	šurúmu, hurákɨ	iʃko			*ᵐbaⁿdi ~ *ᵐbaiⁿd
name	š̱a				*haka ~ *akaʔ
dog	čúčo (Chiquimulilla)	ʃuʃu	*su		*tau
fish	séma	ʃok’ín			*ᵑgwa ~ *uᵑg
louse	tɨmáƚi	tem	*tem		*kũʔ
tree	hútu	suɴ		*ban	*ˈkàr; *kaˈri (C)
leaf	píya	aw			*ka
flower	túƚu	ʃila	*sula		
water	uy		*was	*li	*ⁿdiʔ
fire	uráy	ik’aɴ	*juk’a		*ᵑgi 'firewood'
stone	híš̱i	ke	*ke	*walpa	*hak ~ *kaʔ
earth	náru	omoɴ			*taB(a)
salt	tíʔla	ts’epe			*ⁿdaᵑg
road	táƚma	k’iɴ	*k’in		*hi
eat	rúka	rom-			*kuⁿdi ~ *kuiⁿd
die	teró	ʃil-			
I	nin	unani	*unani	*jam	*ⁿdaH(ⁿd)
you	náka	manani	*amanani	*man	*ᵐbaʔ
