= Cacaopera people =

Central American indigenous group

Cacaopera
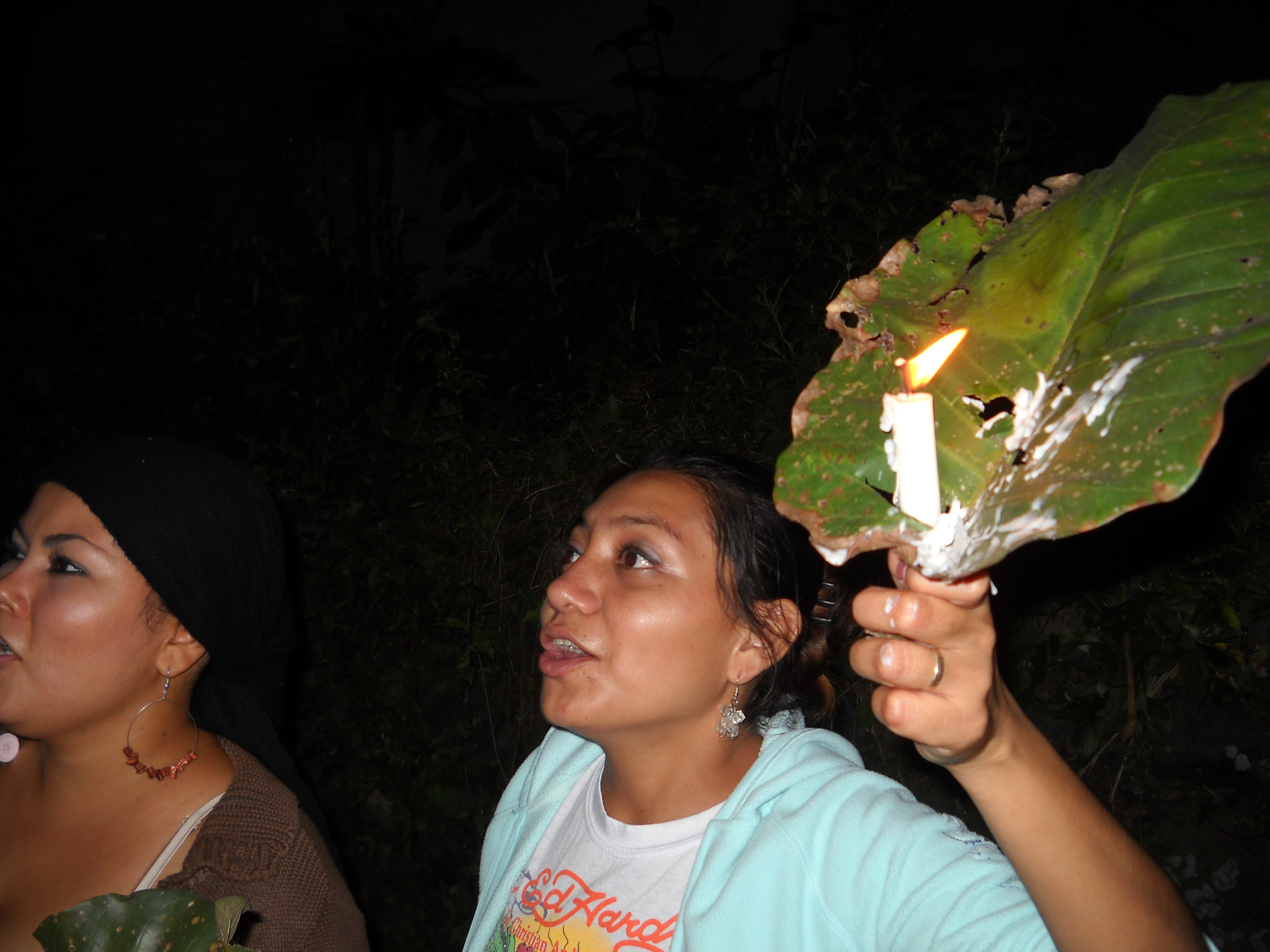
- Cacaopera woman holding a candle in Morazan, El Salvador.

Total population
- 102,000+

Regions with significant populations
- Nicaragua (Matagalpa): 97,500 (2003)
- El Salvador (Morazán): 4,615 (2007)

Languages
- Cacaopera (formerly), Matagalpa

Religion
- Traditional Religion

Related ethnic groups
- Miskito and Mayangna

Map of Cacaopera indigenous groups in both countries.

The Cacaopera people, also known as the Matagalpa or Ulúa, are an Indigenous people in what is now El Salvador and Nicaragua.

== History ==
The Matagalpa are one of the most important cultures in the historical development of the Nicaraguan territory, but they lack precise information that can legitimize their ethnic origin. Most of the studies carried out on this original group have achieved great advances, but they always remain empty that they do not allow to indicate with certainty said origin. The strongest theory is that which attributes the Matagalpa are of Chibcha origin from South America.

Their cultivation of cacao, corn and beans show some Mesoamerican influence. However, historians believe their ceramic style known as "Ceramica Negra" and "Naranja Segovia" show Mayan influence and have been found in abundance in towns near Estelí. According to the archaeologist Edgard Espinosa, Director of the National Museum, the Matagalpa had their highest level of splendor in the ninth century, precisely when the Mayan civilization began to decline and when the Chorotega and Nahua migrations to the western half of Nicaragua began.

Their greatest enemies were the Nicaraos, a Nahua branch that enslaved and captured Cacaoperas for human sacrifice. They were further displaced at the hands of the Nicaraos from Jinotega, Esteli, Boaco, and parts of Matagalpa, particularly the Sebaco valley, one of the most fertile areas in Nicaragua which the Nahuas still inhabit today. This resulted in tribal warfare between the Cacaoperas and the Nicaraos and was a major factor in how the Cacaoperas became one of the most organized, fierce and battle-hardened tribes in Central America by the time of the Spanish arrival.

They also built stone statues representing their chieftain and warriors. They were feared by the Spanish because they were very brave and effective with their bows and other arms, which have earned them the nickname "indios flecheros" (archery indians) in Nicaragua. It took 300 years for the Spanish to submit them, even at the time of Nicaragua's Independence in 1821, there were many Matagalpas free in the central mountains of Nicaragua. In 1856 they were decisive to defeat William Walker's filibusters in the Battle of San Jacinto on 14 September 1856, where a column of 60 Matagalpa people with bow and arrows fought at the side of Nicaraguan Patriots winning that battle, which marked the end of Walker adventure in Nicaragua. The "Indios Flecheros de Matagalpa" were declared National Heroes of the Battle of San Jacinto by the Congress of The Republic of Nicaragua. The declaration also includes a statue built in their honor. They are documented throughout Nicaragua's history fighting for the right of the Republic, in many battles against foreign governments.

== Political and administrative organization ==
In Nicaragua, the initiation of the regidores (first positions of the indigenous structure) consists of the council of elders appointing an indigenous person who possesses a characterization prior to the selection, characteristics linked to the will, disposition towards indigenous work, their ideals and that these elements work in favor of others. Visualized as indicated, he is appointed as the first councilor, delegating community work responsibilities. There are five councilor positions, successively up to the fifth, the jobs are operational signed by a higher position, each of these transitory stages has a period of one year and in the hierarchical order the rods are transferred in a symbolic way, concluding with the thickest rod which is that of the mayor of vara and is the last position to later be able to assume a position of elder council. Every January 6, the different regions or gullies meet as well as the councils and the board of directors, the candle of rods consists of gathering all the rods, carrying out the celebration of a ritual, preparing the act of handover to the aldermen, mayors symbolically receive their rods, having completed their period of preparation in each of the positions.

Regarding the indigenous people, there is an article in their legal statutes that mentions what refers to elections, specifying the constitution of an indigenous electoral council for a specific period in Nicaragua. This regulatory body is elected by the council of elders made up of a president, vice president, secretary and a person in charge of logistics. The function of this body is to administer the entire electoral process. All older citizens are free to vote with an indigenous identity card or not, mestizo or non-mestizo. There are 52 communities that participate in the elections

== Language ==
Matagalpa people spoke the Cacaopera and Matagalpa language, both of which are Misumalpan languages and are now extinct.

== External links and further reading ==
- Cacaopera artwork, National Museum of the American Indian
- Vestiges of Ancient Indigenous Language Still Found Today in Matagalpa’s Northern Highlands
- Almeida, I., Arrobo Rodas, N., & Ojeda Segovia, L. (2005). Autonomía Indígena. Ecuador: S.E.
- Arauz, E. K. (2010). Raíces del Centro Norte de Nicaragua. Managua: S.E.
- Balendier, G. (2005). Antropología Política. Buenos Aires: Del Sol.
- Carmack, R. M. (1993). Historia general de Centro América: Historia Antigua. Madrid: SIRUELA.
- CIDCA-UCA. (2006). Género, etnias y partidos políticos en las elecciones regionales. Revista del caribe nicaragüense, 10-22.
- Revista Nicaragüense de Antropología. Año 1 No. 1/2017
- Kuhl, E. (2006). Indios matagalpas: Lenguas cuentos y leyenda.
- Lehmann, H. (1973). Las culturas precolombinas. Argentina: EUDEBA.
- Leslie Bethell, e. (1990). Historia de América Latina. ESPAÑA: Editorial Critica Barcelona.
- Monachon, D., & Gonda, N. (2011). Liberación de la propiedad versus territorios indígenas en el Norte de Nicaragua: el casos de los Chorotegas. Nicaragua: S.E.
- Tijerino, F. K. (2008). Historia de Nicaragua. Managua: IHNC-UCA .
- El mito de la “ Nicaragua mestiza” y la resistencia indígena, 1880-1980. Editorial Universidad de Costa Rica.
- Colonización en Matagalpa y Jinotega (1820-1890). URACCAN: Nicaragua.
