= Alaguilac people =

Extinct Indigenous people of Guatemala

The Alaguilac were an Indigenous people who lived on the Río Motagua in what is now eastern Guatemala, specifically in San Agustín Acasaguastlán. The Alagüilac language is unclassified.
