= Manguean languages =

Extinct group of Central American languages

Manguean
- Geographic distribution: Mexico, Nicaragua, Costa Rica
- Linguistic classification: Oto-Manguean: Western; Tlapanec–Manguean; Manguean
- Subdivisions: Chorotega (Mangue); Chiapanec

Language codes
- Glottolog: mang1426

The Manguean languages were a branch of the Oto-Manguean family. They were Chorotega of Costa Rica and Nicaragua (where it was called Mangue or Monimbo), and Chiapanec of Mexico, both of which are now extinct. Terrence Kaufman estimated that the two diverged around AD 600-700, speculating the fall of Teotihuacan as a cause. Based on archaeological and linguistic evidence, it is often theorized that the languages originated in what is now the Mexican state of Puebla before they migrated southeast to Chiapas during the late Classic Period.
