= Jumaytepeque Xinca =

Extinct Xincan language of Guatemala

Jumaytepeque
- Native to: Guatemala
- Region: Volcán Jumaytepeque
- Ethnicity: Xinca people
- Native speakers: (moribund or extinct cited 1997)
- Language family: Xincan: Jumaytepeque

Language codes
- ISO 639-3: (covered by Xinca xin)
- Glottolog: xink1235
- ELP: Jumaytepeque Xinka

Jumaytepeque Xinca is an extinct Xincan language of Guatemala that was spoken in the region of Jumaytepeque. It was first identified by Lyle Campbell in the 1970s.

== Phonology ==
=== Consonants ===
Jumaytepeque Xinca consonants
		Labial	Alveolar		Post- alveolar	Retroflex	Velar	Glottal
		Labial	plain	sibilant	Post- alveolar	Retroflex	Velar	Glottal
Stop/ Affricate	plain	p	t		t͡ʃ		k	ʔ
Stop/ Affricate	ejective	pʼ	tʼ	t͡sʼ	t͡ʃʼ		kʼ	
Stop/ Affricate	voiced	b	d				(ɡ)	
Fricative			ɬ	s		ʂ		h
Nasal	plain	m	n					
Nasal	glottalized	mʼ	nʼ					
Approximant	plain		l		j		w	
Approximant	glottalized		lʼ		jʼ		wʼ	
Trill	plain		r					
Trill	glottalized		rʼ					

=== Vowels ===
The Xincan languages all have six vowels.

	Front	Central	Back
Close	i iː	ɨ ɨː	u uː
Close-mid	e eː		o oː
Open		a aː	
