= Supanecan languages =

Language family and subgroup of Oto-Manguean

Supanec
- Tlapanecan
- Geographic distribution: Mexico, Nicaragua
- Linguistic classification: Oto-Manguean: Western Oto-Mangue; Tlapanec–Mangue; Supanec
- Subdivisions: Tlapanec; Subtiaba †; ? Maribo †

Language codes
- Glottolog: subt1249

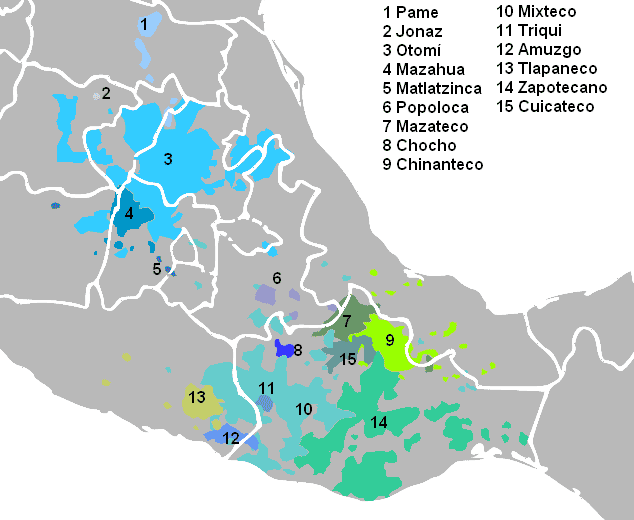
Map of Oto-Manguean languages including Tlapeneco (#13, light green)

The Supanecan or Tlapanecan languages are Tlapanec (Me'phaa) of Guerrero and the extinct Subtiaba of Nicaragua. The family was recognized in 1925 by Edward Sapir, who linked them to his Hokan proposal. However, they are the most recently recognized members of the Oto-Manguean language family, the relationship having been demonstrated in 1977 by Jorge Suárez. The Oto-Manguean affiliation of Tlapaneco-Subtiaba is supported by Kaufman (2016).

Kaufman estimated that these two languages diverged in approximately 1200 AD.

Sapir proposed that a third language, the extinct Maribo of the village of Maribichicoa, on the Guatajiguala River in Lencan country in El Salvador, may have been the closest relative of Subtiaba, or that it in fact was Subtiaba. However, Campbell (1975) questions this. Lothrop writes that it was instead located in the Nueva Segovia Department of Nicaragua, the speakers having moved there shortly before the Spanish conquest after a drought.
