= Tlapanec language =

Oto-Mangue language spoken in Mexico

Tlapanec
- Me̱ꞌpha̱a̱
- Pronunciation: [meʔpʰaː]
- Native to: Mexico
- Region: Guerrero, Morelos
- Ethnicity: Tlapanec
- Native speakers: 150,000 (2020 census)
- Language family: Oto-Manguean: Tlapanecan; Tlapanec

Language codes
- ISO 639-3: Variously: tcf – Malinaltepec (east) tpc – Azoyú (south) tpl – Tlacoapa (central) tpx – Acatepec (west)
- Glottolog: subt1249 Tlapanec + Subtiaba
- ELP: Tlapanec
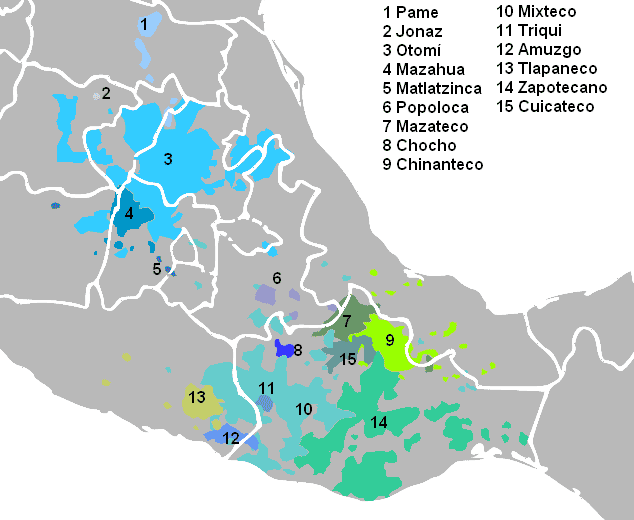
- Tlapanec (Ochre, number 13) and the rest of the modern Oto-Manguean languages

Tlapanec /ˈtlæpənɛk/, or Meꞌphaa, is an indigenous Mexican language spoken by more than 98,000 Tlapanec people in the state of Guerrero. Like other Oto-Manguean languages, it is tonal and has complex inflectional morphology. The ethnic group themselves refer to their ethnic identity and language as Me̱ꞌpha̱a̱ [meʔpʰaː].

Before much information was known about it, Tlapanec (sometimes written "Tlappanec" in earlier publications) was either considered unclassified or linked to the controversial Hokan language family. It is now definitively considered part of the Oto-Manguean language family, of which it forms its own branch along with the extinct and very closely related Subtiaba language of Nicaragua.

Meꞌphaa people temporarily move to other locations, including Mexico City, Morelos and various locations in the United States, for reasons of work.

== Varieties ==
Ethnologue distinguishes four Tlapanec languages:

- Acatepec (dialects Acatepec proper, Huitzapula, Nanzintla, Teocuitlapa, Zapotitlán Tablas)
- Azoyú
- Malinaltepec (dialect Huehuetepec/Zilacayotitlán)
- Tlacoapa (dialects Tlacoapa proper, Tenamazapa)

Other sources of information, including native speakers and the Instituto Nacional de Lenguas Indígenas of the Mexican government, identify eight or nine varieties, which have been given official status: Acatepec, Azoyú, Malinaltepec, Tlacoapa, Nancintla, Teocuitlapa, Zapotitlán Tablas (with Huitzapula sometimes considered distinct), Zilacayotitlán. These share mutual intelligibility of 50% between Malinaltepec and Tlacoapa, though Acatepec has an 80% intelligibility of both.

The Azoyú variety is the only natural language reported to have used the pegative case, though it is verbal case like other 'case' markers in Tlapanec.

== Grammar ==
Tlapanec is an ergative–absolutive language. However, while most languages of this type have an overt ergative case, Tlapanec is one of the rare examples of a marked absolutive language, that is, an ergative language that overtly marks the absolutive and leaves the ergative unmarked.

== Phonology ==
There is wide variation in the reported phonology of Tlapanec, including from the following sources:

- Weathers (1984) on the Malinaltepec variety
- Carrasco Zúñiga & Weathers (1988) and Black (2004) on the Malinaltepec variety
- Marlett & Weathers (2018) on multiple varieties
- Marlett & Neri Remigio (2020) on the Acatepec variety

=== Vowels ===
Vowels of the Malinaltepec variety (Weathers 1984)
		Front		Central		Back	
		short	long	short	long	short	long
Close	oral	i	iː			u	uː
Close	nasal	ĩ	ĩː			ũ	ũː
Mid	oral	e	eː			o	oː
Mid	nasal	ẽ	ẽː			õ	õː
Open	oral			a	aː		
Open	nasal			ã	ãː		

According to Carrasco Zúñiga & Weathers (1988) and Black (2004), in addition to lengthening and nasalization, vowels may also be glottalized; they can be any combination of the three (lengthened, nasalized, glottalized).

=== Consonants ===
Consonants of the Malinaltepec variety (Weathers 1984)
		Bilabial	Alveolar	Post-alveolar	Palatal	Velar	Glottal
Plosive	voiceless	p	t			k	ʔ
Plosive	aspirated	pʰ	tʰ			kʰ	
Plosive	voiced	b	d			ɡ	
Affricate	voiceless		t͡s	t͡ʃ			
Affricate	voiced			d͡ʒ			
Fricative			s	ʂ ~ ʃ			h
Nasal		m	n				
Rhotic			r				
Approximant			l		j	w	

Consonants of the Malinaltepec variety (Carrasco Zúñiga & Weathers 1988 / Black 2004)
		Labial	Dental	Palatal	Velar	Glottal
Plosive or Affricate	voiceless	p ⟨p⟩	t ⟨t⟩	t͡ʃ ⟨ch⟩	k ⟨k⟩	ʔ ⟨ꞌ⟩
Plosive or Affricate	aspirated	pʰ ⟨ph⟩	tʰ ⟨th⟩		kʰ ⟨kh⟩	
Plosive or Affricate	voiced	b ⟨b⟩	d ⟨d⟩	d͡ʒ ⟨dx⟩	ɡ ⟨g⟩	
Continuant		ɸ ⟨f⟩	s (t͡s) ⟨s⟩	ʃ ⟨x⟩	x ⟨j⟩	
Nasal		m ⟨m⟩	n ⟨n⟩	ɲ ⟨ñ⟩	(ŋ) ⟨ŋ⟩	
Sonorant		w ⟨w⟩	l ⟨l⟩	j ⟨y⟩		
Vibrant			r ⟨r⟩			

According to Weathers (1984), the retroflexion (subapical articulation) of the voiceless postalveolar fricative varies, being [ʃ] before /i/, fluctuating between [ʃ] ~ [ʂ] before /u/, retaining slight retroflexion before consonants, and fully retroflexed elsewhere.

Also according to Weathers (1984), Allophones of the sounds /v b ɡ n r/ include [f β ɣ ŋ ɾ~ʐ]. In the existence of the cluster /hw/, an allophone [ɸ] may be heard.

=== Tones ===
Tones differ based on variety.

== Orthography ==
Tlapanec alphabet
Uppercase	A	B	Ch	D	Dx	E	F	G	I	J	K	Kh	L	M	N	Ñ	Ŋ	O	P	Ph	R	S	T	Th	U	W	X	Y	Ꞌ
Lowercase	a	b	ch	d	dx	e	f	g	i	j	k	kh	l	m	n	ñ	ŋ	o	p	ph	r	s	t	th	u	w	x	y	ꞌ

The glottal stop is written with a saltillo ⟨Ꞌ ꞌ⟩.

== Media ==
Tlapanec-language programming is carried by the CDI's radio station XEZV-AM, broadcasting from Tlapa de Comonfort, Guerrero.
