= Chiapanec language =

Oto-Manguean language of Chiapas, Mexico

Chiapanec
- Native to: Mexico
- Region: Chiapas
- Ethnicity: 32 Chiapanec (1990)
- Extinct: after 1915
- Language family: Oto-Mangue: Manguean; Chiapanec

Language codes
- ISO 639-3: cip
- Glottolog: chia1262
- ELP: Chiapanec

Chiapanec is an extinct indigenous Mexican language of the Oto-Manguean language family once spoken by the Chiapanec people in the Central Depression of the Mexican state of Chiapas, especially in Chiapa de Corzo. It is closely related to the Mangue language spoken further to the south in Nicaragua and Costa Rica.

The 1990 census reported 17 speakers of the language in southern Chiapas out of an ethnic population of 32, but later investigations failed to find any speakers. There are, however, a number of written sources on the language. Vocabularies and grammars based on these materials include Aguilar Penagos (2012) and Carpio-Penagos and Álvarez-Vázquez (2014).

Judging from a 1656 document, a language similar to Chiapanec was once spoken in Huixtla.

== Phonology ==
=== Consonants ===
		Labial	Alveolar	Palatal		Velar	Glottal
Plosive/ Affricate	voiceless	p	t	tʃ		k	ʔ
Plosive/ Affricate	prenasal	ᵐb	ⁿd			ᵑɡ	
Fricative			s	ʃ			h
Nasal		m	n	ɲ̊	ɲ		
Flap			ɾ				
Glide		w	l	j			

=== Vowels ===
Four vowels are noted as /i, a, o, u/.

== Samples ==
=== Alabado de la Santísima Cruz ===
I
Sea vendito y alavado [sic]
El Santísimo Sacramento.

II
Anamandiní ya camo,
Tula meja sig mimo.

III
Loju mejá londo mume
Musutá nembon dini yeme yegu

IV
Bati chilijá y peja,
Cupatalá me tiche.

V
Numandimiyire y luju
pusa tangu
Pani memo.

VI
Muju llilaco
Tiché mupatmo
Santísimo coruce.

VII
Luju me londo mume,
Luju me londo mume,
Musutá cupango ume.

VIII
Chasi juluñacaji
Chasi juluñacaji
NAMEN JESOSE

I
Vendito y alavado sea el [sic]
Santísimo Sacramento.
(repeated)

II
Pozotá coyumbo chememo
Naviñen cleme
Navilla sigue reyna santa Elena

III
Copo Pa Chememo,
Muñun indiosis,
Ungutá Jesús de Nazareno

IV
Andilu ta chinda
Gua tiliji,
y pame cojime
Techi no mallarilú

(the four parts are repeated)

=== Lord's Prayer (1854) ===
Pua manguemé nilumá cané nacapajó totomomo copamime chambriomo chalayá guipumutamú gadilojá istanacapú cajilucá nacopajó; cajilo baña yacameomó nuorí maytarilú mindamú aguajimé Uá copomimemo taguajime nambucamic ñeme cuqueme gadilucá li memu, casimemu taguajime nambucamuñe me copá tipusitumu bi cá tipucapuimu muja rimimuñame mangue me Diusi mutarilu nitangamé chacuittamé caji Jesus.

== Bibliography ==
- Aguilar Penagos, Mario (1992). Diccionario de la lengua chiapaneca (in Spanish). Mexico: Government of the State of Chiapas. ISBN 968-842-289-4.
- Aguilar Penagos, Mario (2012). Gramática de la lengua chiapaneca (in Spanish). Mexico: FONCA-CONACULTA.
- del Carpio-Penagos, Carlos Uriel; Álvarez-Vázquez, Juan Ramón (2014). "Vocabulary of the Chiapaneca Language from the Late 18th Century". LiminaR. Estudios Sociales y Humanísticos (in Spanish). 12 (1): 212–230. ISSN 1665-8027.
