= Xincan languages =

Extinct language family of Guatemala

Xincan
- Geographic distribution: Guatemala
- Ethnicity: 264,167 Xinca people (2018 census)
- Extinct: 1970s (3 semi-speakers reported)
- Linguistic classification: One of the world's primary language families
- Subdivisions: Yupiltepeque †; Jumaytepeque †; Chiquimulilla †; Guazacapán †; Sinacantán †; ? Alagüilac †

Language codes
- ISO 639-3: xin
- Glottolog: xinc1237
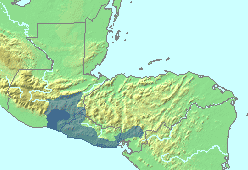
- Geographic distribution of the Xincan languages. Solid blue is the recorded range, transparent is the range attested by toponyms.

Xinca (or Xinka, Sinca, or Szinca) is a small extinct family of Mesoamerican languages; formerly, the language was regarded as a single language isolate. Xinca was once spoken by the Indigenous Xinca people in southeastern Guatemala, parts of El Salvador, and Honduras.

They have also historically been referred to as Popoluca or Popoluca-Xinca; Popoluca being a Nahuatl term for unintelligible speech.

== Classification ==
The Xincan languages have no demonstrated affiliations with other language families. Lehmann (1920) tried linking Xincan with Lencan, but the proposal was never demonstrated. An automated computational analysis (ASJP 4) by Müller et al. (2013) also found lexical similarities between Xincan and Lencan. However, since the analysis was automatically generated, the grouping could be either due to mutual lexical borrowing or genetic inheritance.

The Xincan languages were formerly regarded as one language isolate. However, the most recent studies suggest they were indeed a language family.

=== Languages ===
There were at least four Xincan languages, each of which is now extinct. Yupiltepeque was spoken in Jutiapa Department, while the rest were spoken in Santa Rosa Department. Campbell also suggests that the Alagüilac language of San Cristóbal Acasaguastlán may have in fact been a Xincan language.

- Yupiltepeque: extinct by 1920. Once also spoken in Jutiapa.
- Jumaytepeque: discovered in the early 1970s by Lyle Campbell, spoken near the top of Volcán Jumaytepeque. This is the most divergent variety, and is not mutually intelligible with that of Chiquimulilla. All fluent native speakers of the language have died, but it may have some semi-speakers remaining.
- Chiquimulilla: extinct
- Guazacapán: extinct, some semi-speakers remain.

To these, Glottolog adds

- Sinacantán

Sachse (2010) considers all Xincan speakers today to be semi-speakers, with the completely fluent speakers having already died.

== History ==
Xincan languages have many loanwords from Mayan languages especially in agricultural terms, suggesting extensive contact with Mayan peoples. These come from both the Chʼolan and Quichean branches. According to Campbell, Xinca also has a "vast number of Mixe-Zoquean loanwords", suggesting contact with now extinct Mixe-Zoque varieties of the Guatemalan Pacific coast.

In the 16th century the territory of the Xinca extended from the Pacific coast to the mountains of Jalapa. In 1524 the population was conquered by the Spanish Empire. Many of the people were forced into slavery and compelled to participate in the conquest of modern-day El Salvador. It is from this that the names for the town, river, and bridge "Los Esclavos" (The Slaves) are derived in the area of Cuilapa, Santa Rosa.

After 1575, the process of Xinca cultural extinction accelerated, mainly due to their exportation to other regions. This also contributed to a decrease in the number of Xinca-language speakers. One of the oldest references concerning this language was presented by the archbishop Pedro Cortés y Larraz during a visit to the diocese of Taxisco in 1769.

=== Contemporary situation ===
Xinca was most recently spoken in seven municipalities and a village in the departments of Santa Rosa and Jutiapa. In 1991, it was reported that the language had only 25 speakers; the 2006 edition of the Encyclopedia of Language and Linguistics reported fewer than ten. Nonetheless, of the 16,214 Xinca who responded to the 2002 census, 1,283 reported being Xinca speakers, most probably semi-speakers or people who knew a few words and phrases of the languages. However by 2010, all completely fluent speakers have died, leaving only semi-speakers who know the languages.

== Distribution ==
Xincan languages were once more widespread, which is evident in various toponyms with Xincan origins (Campbell 1997:166). These toponyms are marked by such locative prefixes as ay- "place of" (e.g. Ayampuc, Ayarza), al- "place of" (Alzatate), san- "in" (e.g. Sansare, Sansur), or with the locative suffixes -(a)gua or -hua "town, dwelling" (e.g. Pasasagua, Jagua, Anchagua, Xagua, Eraxagua), and are concentrated in the El Progreso and Jalapa departments as well as the northeastern portion of the Guatemala Department. Some Xinca toponyms are also found in the Copán Department of Honduras.

Kaufman (1970:66) lists the following towns as once being Xinca-speaking.

- Yupiltepeque
- Jumaytepeque (Nueva Santa Rosa)
- San Juan Tecuaco
- Chiquimulilla
- Taxisco
- Santa María Ixhuatán
- Guazacapán

Sachse (2010), citing colonial-era sources, lists the following villages in Santa Rosa Department and Jutiapa Department as having Xinca speakers during the Spanish colonial era.

- Guanagazapa (Guanagazapan), in Escuintla Department
- Guaymango
- Itiquipaque (also known as Atiquipaque or Nextiquipaque)
- Tepeaco
- Tacuilula
- Taxisco
- Guazacapán
- Chiquimulilla
- Sinacantán
- Nancinta
- Tecuaco
- Ixhuatán (Izguatlán)
- Jumaytepéque
- Jalpatagua
- Jutiapa
- Comapa
- Yupiltepeque
- Atescatempa
- La Zacualpa
- Contepeque
- Achuapa
- Valle Tierra Blanca (parish of Tacuilula)
- Santa Ana (parish of Xinacantán)
- San Juan Mixtán (a trilingual village where Spanish, Nahuatl, and Xinca were spoken)

== Phonology ==
The phonological system of Xincan languages had some variance, as evidenced by the variations in recorded phonology exhibited among semi-speakers of the two remaining languages. The basic syllable structure is #(C)V(V/C) word-initially, but CV(V/C) word-internally.

=== Vowels ===
It is generally agreed upon that the Xincan languages have 6 vowels.

	Front	Central	Back
Close	i iː	ɨ ɨː	u uː
Close-mid	e eː		o oː
Open		a aː	

=== Consonants ===
These charts show the consonants of two languages, used by the final semi-speakers of the language.

Jumaytepeque consonants
		Labial	Alveolar		Post- alveolar	Retroflex	Velar	Glottal
		Labial	plain	sibilant	Post- alveolar	Retroflex	Velar	Glottal
Stop/ Affricate	plain	p	t		t͡ʃ		k	ʔ
Stop/ Affricate	ejective	pʼ	tʼ	t͡sʼ	t͡ʃʼ		kʼ	
Stop/ Affricate	voiced	b	d				(ɡ)	
Fricative			ɬ	s		ʂ		h
Nasal	plain	m	n					
Nasal	glottalized	mʼ	nʼ					
Approximant	plain		l		j		w	
Approximant	glottalized		lʼ		jʼ		wʼ	
Trill	plain		r					
Trill	glottalized		rʼ					

Yupiltepeque consonants
		Labial	Alveolar		Post- alveolar	Velar	Glottal
		Labial	plain	sibilant	Post- alveolar	Velar	Glottal
Stop		p	t			k	
Affricate	plain				t͡ʃ		
Affricate	ejective			t͡sʼ			
Fricative			ɬ	s	ʃ		h
Nasal	plain	m	n				
Nasal	glottalized		nʼ				
Approximant			l		j	w	
Trill			r				

Many younger semi-speakers also used the phonemes /b, d, g, f, ŋ/ due to greater influence from Spanish.

== Typology ==
Xincan languages are somewhat polysynthetic and use nominative-accusative alignment. There are prefixes that act as person agreement markers on verbs, but possession markers on nouns. There are three verb classes: neutral (including all transitive verbs), unergative verbs (indicated by the suffix -lha’/-la’/-lá), and unaccusative verbs (indicated by the suffix -’). Antipassive verbs are formed with the suffix -k’i. The basic word order is VOS. Adjectives and articles precede nouns, while demonstratives and possessed nouns follow nouns. Alienable possession is indicated by prefixes, and inalienable possession by suffixes. Xinca has relational nouns which can also be used as prepositions when not possessed.

== See also ==
- Alagüilac language
- Macro-Chibchan languages
- Classification of Indigenous languages of the Americas
