= Relational noun =

Word class in many languages

Relational nouns, or relator nouns, are a word class in many languages. They are characterized as functioning syntactically as nouns although they convey the meaning for which other languages use adpositions (prepositions and postpositions). In Mesoamerican languages, the use of relational nouns constitutes an areal feature of the Mesoamerican linguistic area, including the Mayan languages, Mixe–Zoquean languages, and Oto-Manguean languages.

Relational nouns are also widespread in Southeast Asia (e.g. Vietnamese, Thai), East Asia (e.g. Mandarin Chinese, Japanese, Lhasa Tibetan), Central Asia (e.g. the Turkic languages), Armenian, the Munda languages of South Asia (e.g. Sora), and in the Micronesian languages.

A relational noun is grammatically speaking a simple noun, but because its meaning describes a spatial or temporal relation, rather than a "thing", it describes location, movement, and other relations, just like prepositions in the languages that have them. When used, the noun is "owned" by another noun and describes a relation between its "owner" and a third noun. For example, one could say "the cup is the table its-surface", where "its surface" is a relational noun denoting the position of something standing on a flat surface. Here are examples:

Classical Nahuatl

Ca ī-pan petlatl in mistōn.
Be its-on mat the cat
"The cat is on the mat.'

Japanese

Neko wa mushiro no ue ni neteiru.
Cat [topic] mat 's top/above {[case marker]} sleeps/lies
'The cat is sleeping on top of the mat.'

Mandarin Chinese

Tā zài fángzi lǐtou.
She be.at house interior
"She is in the house.'

Turkish

Otel-in ön-ün-de bir araba var.
Hotel-'s front-its-at one car existent
'There is a car in front of the hotel.'

Often, relational nouns are derived from or related in meaning to words for bodyparts and so, for example, to say "inside", one says "its stomach", and to say "on top of", one says "its back".

== See also ==
- Coverb
- Adposition
- Grammatical case

== Sources ==
- Starosta, Stanley (1985). "Relator nouns as a source of case inflection". In Venetta Z. Acson and Richard L. Leed (ed.). For Gordon H. Fairbanks. Honolulu: University of Hawaii Press. pp. 111–133. ISBN 0-8248-0992-0.
