= Yupiltepeque Xinca =

Extinct Xincan language of Guatemala

Yupiltepeque
- Native to: Guatemala
- Region: Yupiltepeque
- Ethnicity: Xinca people
- Extinct: by 1920
- Language family: Xincan: Yupiltepeque

Language codes
- ISO 639-3: (covered by Xinca xin)
- Glottolog: xinc1243

Yupiltepeque Xinca is an extinct Xincan language of Guatemala, from the region of Yupiltepeque.

== Phonology ==
=== Vowels ===
	Front	Central	Back
Close	i iː	ɨ ɨː	u uː
Close-mid	e eː		o oː
Open		a aː	

=== Consonants ===
		Labial	Alveolar		Post- alveolar	Velar	Glottal
		Labial	plain	sibilant	Post- alveolar	Velar	Glottal
Stop		p	t			k	
Affricate	plain				t͡ʃ		
Affricate	ejective			t͡sʼ			
Fricative			ɬ	s	ʃ		h
Nasal	plain	m	n				
Nasal	glottalized		nʼ				
Approximant			l		j	w	
Trill			r				

== Sources ==
- Campbell, Lyle (1997). American Indian languages: The historical linguistics of Native America. New York: Oxford University Press. ISBN 0-19-509427-1.
