= Subtiaba language =

Extinct Oto-Manguean language

Subtiaba
- Native to: Nicaragua
- Ethnicity: 20,000 (2005)-49,000 (2006)
- Extinct: 1920s
- Language family: Oto-Mangue: Tlapanecan; Subtiaba

Language codes
- ISO 639-3: sut
- Glottolog: subt1250

Subtiaba, also known as Maribio, is an extinct Oto-Manguean language which was spoken on the Pacific slope of Nicaragua, especially in the Subtiaba district of León. Edward Sapir established a connection between Subtiaba and Tlapanec. When Lehmann wrote about it in 1909 it was already very endangered or moribund.

The name "Subtiaba" may be of Nahuatl origin, from the roots xoctli ("black snail"), atl ("water"), pan ("on").

== Phonology ==
Lehmann thought there may have been some sort of variation between voiceless and voiced stops, which may account for some discrepancies between datasets. Stops were voiced after nasals. ⟨r⟩ and ⟨hr⟩ were used in transcriptions to represent /ʂ/, a phonological correspondence shared with some local registers of Spanish and other Central American indigenous languages.

== Lexicon ==
Subtiaba evidently had some loanwords from Mangue, a neighboring language only distantly related. These include chitú "cat" (Mangue chitu), sidáa "rooster" (M. sitaraca), ñusi "tiste" (from M. ñusi, "cacao"), dagaba "frog/toad" (M. na-tokopó). Both Subtiaba words for corn may have ultimately derived from Mayan languages.

There were also loans from Spanish. For example, jabón "soap" became Subtiaba rabuni /ʂabuni/, having been borrowed at a time when the Spanish word was still pronounced with an initial /ʃ/.

== Lexical comparison with Tlapanec ==
Lexical comparison from Native American Language Net:

English	Subtiaba	Tlapanec
One	i·mba	mba^{1}
Two	a·pu·	a^{3}hma^{3}
Three	a·su	a^{2}cu^{1}
Four	axku	a^{2}kho^{3}
Man	ra·bu	ša^{3}bo^{3}
Woman	ra·bagu·	a'^{3}go^{3}
Dog	ru·wa	šu^{3}wã^{1}
Sun	ahka	a^{3}kha'^{3}
Moon	uku	gő'^{3}
Water	i·lu	i^{2}ya^{2}

Note that Subtiaba ⟨r⟩ represents /ʂ/.

== See also ==
- Tlapanecan languages
