= Chiquimulilla Xinca =

Extinct Xincan language of Guatemala

Chiquimulilla
- Native to: Guatemala
- Region: Chiquimulilla
- Ethnicity: Xinca people
- Extinct: 1970s fully in 1996, with the death of Julian de la Cruz, the last semi-speaker Few remembers exist
- Language family: Xincan: Chiquimulilla

Language codes
- ISO 639-3: (covered by Xinca xin)
- Glottolog: xinc1242
- ELP: Chiquimulilla Xinka

Chiquimulilla Xinca is an extinct Xincan language of Guatemala, from the region of Chiquimulilla.

== History ==
Chiquimulilla Xinca was formerly spoken by Xinca people on the Pacific coast of Guatemala. The language suffered a sharp decline in speakers during the 20th century. As of 2010 the language is extinct but there are elderly people who remember the language.

== Phonology ==
=== Consonants ===
Chiquimulilla Xinca consonants
		Labial	Alveolar		Post- alveolar	Retroflex	Velar	Glottal
		Labial	plain	sibilant	Post- alveolar	Retroflex	Velar	Glottal
Stop/ Affricate	plain	p	t		t͡ʃ		k	ʔ
Stop/ Affricate	ejective	pʼ	tʼ	t͡sʼ	t͡ʃʼ		kʼ	
Stop/ Affricate	voiced	b	(d)				(ɡ)	
Fricative			ɬ	s		ʂ		h
Nasal	plain	m	n					
Nasal	glottalized	mʼ	nʼ					
Approximant	plain		l		j		w	
Approximant	glottalized		lʼ		jʼ		wʼ	
Trill	plain		r					
Trill	glottalized		rʼ					

=== Vowels ===
The Xincan languages all have 6 vowels.

	Front	Central	Back
Close	i iː	ɨ ɨː	u uː
Close-mid	e eː		o oː
Open		a aː	
