= Volcán Jumaytepeque =

Mountain and volcano in Guatemala

- Location within Guatemala

Highest point
- Elevation: 1,815 m (5,955 ft)
- Coordinates: 14°20′8″N 90°16′10″W

Geography
- Location: Guatemala

Geology
- Mountain type: Stratovolcano
- Volcanic arc: Central America Volcanic Arc
- Last eruption: Unknown

Volcán Jumaytepeque is a stratovolcano in south-eastern Guatemala. The 1,815-metre-high (5,955 ft) volcano is located about 7 km north-north-east of the city of Cuilapa, near the south-eastern rim of the large Miocene Santa Rosa de Lima caldera.

== See also ==
- List of volcanoes in Guatemala
