= Verbal case =

In grammar, the term verbal case has been used with various meanings.

1. It may simply indicate the noun-case system of core arguments of the verb, such as nominative, accusative, ergative, absolutive, and sometimes core dative or benefactive. That is, the cases of those nouns most closely associated with the verb, and which may trigger verbal agreement or may be affected by the voice of a clause, rather than the cases of the more peripheral oblique arguments. A verbal case system may thus be synonymous with morphosyntactic alignment.
2. 'Verbal case' may also mean those noun cases governed by the relationship of the noun to the verb, in contrast with 'nominal case', where the case of a noun is determined by another noun (for example, the genitive). In this use, 'verbal case' is nearly synonymous with 'case', as in most languages with case, all cases but the genitive are governed by the verb.
3. It may also be used for noun inflections which confer verbal properties to the noun. When a noun takes certain cases, it may also agree with the verb in tense–aspect–mood, for example, and so not behave as a typical noun.
4. It may refer to inflections of the verb which are argued to behave semantically like case on nouns. Traditionally, case is defined as a morphological inflection of the noun, not the verb, and it is controversial whether verbal inflections can truly behave like a case system.

== Verbal case vs. nominal case ==
It is frequently remarked that the genitive case behaves differently than other cases: Most cases (sometimes 'verbal' cases) are governed by their role in the clause relative to the verb, whereas the genitive (a 'nominal' case) is governed by another noun. For instance, the difference in English between nominative "I" and oblique "me" is governed by its relationship to the verb (at least according to prescriptive grammars), whereas the genitive form "my" is associated with a noun: I see the dog, the dog sees me, but my dog.

There are other situations where a case has been argued to be nominal rather than verbal. For instance, in Latin, a noun may be inflected for case according to its role with an infinitive, which is arguably as much a noun as a verb, and this has been called nominal case:

prīmō resistere Macedōnēs
first resist.INF Macedonian.NOM.PL
'At first, the Macedonians resisted'

Similarly, when a verb is nominalized, its arguments may remain with their original cases:

She likes me → (I don't like) her liking me

Here, as the verb 'likes' is changed to the gerund 'liking', and the nominative 'she' changes to genitive 'her', but the oblique case of 'me' remains. Such situations are very common in subordinate clauses.
