= Matagalpa language =

Extinct Misumalpan language of Nicaragua

Matagalpa
- Pantasmas
- Native to: Nicaragua
- Region: Central Highlands
- Ethnicity: 20,000 Matagalpa people
- Extinct: c. 1880
- Language family: Misumalpan: Sumalpan; Matagalpan; Matagalpa

Language codes
- ISO 639-3: mtn
- Glottolog: mata1288
- Linguasphere: 81-AAC-ba

Matagalpa is an extinct Misumalpan language formerly spoken in the central highlands of Nicaragua.

It was closely related to Cacaopera. The ethnic group, which numbers about 20,000, now speaks Spanish.

According to local inhabitants familiar with remote regions, the language may still be spoken in the highland areas of Azancor, Musún, and Pancasan, located in Matagalpa Department. Many words of Matagalpa are still used in the region.
