= Sinacantán Xinca =

Extinct Xincan language of Guatemala

Sinacantan
- Native to: Guatemala
- Region: Santa Rosa Department, Guatemala
- Ethnicity: Xinca people
- Extinct: (date missing)
- Language family: Xincan: Sinacantan

Language codes
- ISO 639-3: (covered by Xinca xin)
- Glottolog: xinc1245

Sinacantán Xinca is an extinct Xincan language that was spoken in the region of Sinacantán (Xinca: Xan Gixtamay) in Santa Rosa Department, Guatemala.
