= Guazacapán Xinca =

Xincan language of Guatemala

Guazacapán
- Native to: Guatemala
- Region: Guazacapán
- Ethnicity: Xinca people
- Native speakers: 1 semi-speaker (2014)
- Language family: Xincan: Guazacapán

Language codes
- ISO 639-3: (covered by Xinca xin)
- Glottolog: xinc1246
- ELP: Guazacapán Xinka

Guazacapán Xinca is a moribund or extinct Xincan language that was spoken in the region of Guazacapán in Santa Rosa Department, Guatemala. It has only a single semi-speaker as of 2014.

== Phonology ==
=== Consonants ===
Guazacapán Xinca consonants
		Labial	Alveolar		Post- alveolar	Retroflex	Velar	Glottal
		Labial	plain	sibilant	Post- alveolar	Retroflex	Velar	Glottal
Stop/ Affricate	plain	p	t		t͡ʃ		k	ʔ
Stop/ Affricate	ejective	pʼ	tʼ	t͡sʼ	t͡ʃʼ		kʼ	
Stop/ Affricate	voiced	(b)	(d)				(ɡ)	
Fricative			ɬ	s		ʂ		h
Nasal	plain	m	n					
Nasal	glottalized	mʼ	nʼ					
Approximant	plain		l		j		w	
Approximant	glottalized		lʼ		jʼ		wʼ	
Trill	plain		r					
Trill	glottalized		rʼ					

=== Vowels ===
The Xincan languages all have 6 vowels.

	Front	Central	Back
Close	i iː	ɨ ɨː	u uː
Close-mid	e eː		o oː
Open		a aː	
