= Cacaopera language =

Extinct Misumalpan language of El Salvador

Cacaopera
- Native to: El Salvador
- Region: Morazán Department
- Ethnicity: Cacaopera people
- Extinct: 1974
- Language family: Misumalpan: Sumalpan; Matagalpan; Cacaopera

Language codes
- ISO 639-3: ccr
- Glottolog: caca1247
- Linguasphere: 81-AAC-aa
- Map of El Salvador's Indigenous Peoples at the time of the Spanish conquest: 1. Pipil people, 2. Lenca, 3. Kakawira o Cacaopera people, 4. Xinca, 5. Maya Ch'orti' people, 6. Maya Poqomam people, 7. Mangue o Chorotega.

Cacaopera is an extinct Misumalpan language formerly spoken in the department of Morazán in El Salvador by the Cacaopera people. It was closely related to Matagalpa, and slightly more distantly to Sumo, but was geographically separated from other Misumalpan languages.

The last semi-speakers of Cacaopera, none of them native speakers, died in 1974.

== Phonology ==
=== Consonants ===
Cacaopera consonant phonemes
		Bilabial	Dento-alveolar	Palatal	Velar
Plosive	voiceless	p	t	t͡ʃ	k
Plosive	voiced	b	d		
Fricative			s		x
Nasal		m	n		
Lateral			l		
Trill			r		
Semivowel		w		j	

=== Vowels ===
Misumalpan vowel phonemes
	Front	Back
Close	i	u
Open	a	

=== Suprasegmentals ===
Stress is phonemic in Cacaopera.

== Lexicon ==
Lyle Campbell noted loanwords in Cacaopera and Matagalpa from both Spanish and Nawat, as well as lexical similarities to Lencan, Xincan and Kʼicheʼ.
