= Alagüilac language =

Unclassified extinct language of Guatemala

Alagüilac
- (unattested)
- Native to: Guatemala
- Region: Motagua River
- Ethnicity: Alaguilac people
- Era: before 16th century
- Language family: unclassified (Xincan?)

Language codes
- ISO 639-3: None (mis)
- Glottolog: (insufficiently attested or not a distinct language) alag1249

Alagüilac is an undocumented indigenous American language that is thought to have been spoken by the Alaguilac people of Guatemala at the time of the Spanish conquest. It is also called Acavastlan, Acasaguastlán, or Acasaquastlan, after the location where it was recorded.

== Views on the language ==
Brinton (1892) considered Alaguilac to be a dialect of Pipil. However, Campbell (1972) believes this is wrong. Brinton may have been misled by his sources: In 1576 Palacio reported the language of Acavastlan, Guatemala, which he called Tlacacebatleca. Juarros mentioned that "Alagüilac" was spoken in San Cristóbal Acasaguastlán and "Mejicano" was spoken in San Agustín Acasaguastlán. This started a debate on whether Alagüilac was a relative of Pipil. Since Briton found four pages, written between 1610 and 1637 in a Nahua dialect, in the archives of San Cristóbal Acasaguastlán, and further since in 1878 Bromowicz compiled a list of Nahua words in San Agustín Acasaguastlán, Brinton concluded that Alagüilac was nothing more than a form of Nahua. Nonetheless, the archeological evidence does not support the language of the area being Nahua. Others have suggested that Acaguastlán could have been bilingual in Pipil and a Maya language such as Poqomchiʼ or Poqomam.

However, Campbell argues that the presence of the Pipil or Nahua in the Motagua River valley could have been the result of forced population movements after the Spanish Conquest. For example, the neighboring town of Salamá was a Pipil community populated by slaves brought in by the Spanish governor, Pedro de Alvarado. He also argues that the Cakchiquels and Poqom expanded from the north into central Guatemala, where they encountered a Xinca population, as evidenced by the large number of Xinca words in these languages. He suggests therefore that Alagüilac may have been a Xinca language; many local place names appear to be of Xinca origin, such as Sanarate, Sansare, Sansur, and Ayampuc.
