= Misumalpan languages =

Language family of Mosquitia

Misumalpan
- Misuluan
- Geographic distribution: Mosquitia
- Linguistic classification: Macro-Chibchan ?: Misumalpan
- Subdivisions: Miskito; Sumalpan

Language codes
- Glottolog: misu1242
- Linguasphere: 81-AA
- Historical (dotted) and current (colored) distribution of the Misumalpan languages

The Misumalpan languages (also Misumalpa or Misuluan) are a small family of languages spoken by different Indigenous groups in the region commonly known as Mosquitia, referred to in Miskitu as Yapti Tasba Masrka (“the People’s Land”).

The name “Misumalpan” was coined by American anthropologist John Alden Mason in the early 20th century as a comparative linguistic term. It is not an autonym used by any of the Indigenous nations it describes. The term is an acronym formed from the names of the family’s three branches: Miskitu, Mayangna (often labeled Sumu/Sumo in earlier literature), and Matagalpan languages.

Scholarly sources note that “Sumu/Sumo” are exonyms, whereas Mayangna is the community’s own name. Similarly, Miskitu is the preferred self-designation, while “Miskito” reflects Spanish and English colonial spellings.

The grouping was first recognized as a linguistic family by Walter Lehmann in 1920.

All recorded languages of the Matagalpan branch are extinct, although Matagalpa cultural identity persists. By contrast, Miskitu and Mayangna remain living languages. Miskitu has an estimated 180,000–200,000 speakers and functions as a regional lingua franca on the Caribbean coast.

Most Mayangna speakers are bilingual in either Miskitu or Spanish, depending on region.

Scholars emphasize that Miskitu, Mayangna, and Matagalpan represent distinct Indigenous peoples with their own histories and identities.

The term “Misumalpan family” refers solely to a linguistic classification and is not a cultural, political, or self-identified grouping.

== External relations ==
Kaufman (1990) finds a connection with Macro-Chibchan to be "convincing", but Misumalpan specialist Ken Hale considered a possible connection between Chibchan and Misumalpan to be "too distant to establish".

== Classification ==
- Miskito – nearly 200,000 speakers, mainly in the North Caribbean Coast Autonomous Region of Nicaragua, but including some in Honduras.
- Sumalpan languages:
  - Sumo languages – some 8,000 speakers along the Huaspuc River and its tributaries, most in Nicaragua but some in Honduras. Many of them have shifted to Miskito.
    - Mayangna - dominant variety of the Sumo family
    - Ulwa
  - Matagalpan
    - †Cacaopera – formerly spoken in the Morazán department of El Salvador; and
    - †Matagalpa – formerly spoken in the central highlands of Nicaragua and the El Paraíso department of Honduras

Miskito became the dominant language of Mosquitia from the late 17th century on, as a result of the people's alliance with the British Empire. In north-eastern Nicaragua, it continues to be adopted by former speakers of Sumo. Its sociolinguistic status is lower than that of the English-based creole of the southeast, and in that region, Miskito seems to be losing ground. Sumo is endangered in most areas where it is found, although some evidence suggests that it was dominant in the region before the ascendancy of Miskito. The Matagalpan languages are long since extinct, and not very well documented.

All Misumalpan languages share the same phonology, apart from phonotactics. The consonants are p, b, t, d, k, s, h, w, y, and voiced and voiceless versions of m, n, ng, l, r; the vowels are short and long versions of a, i, u.

=== Loukotka (1968) ===
Below is a full list of Misumalpan language varieties listed by Loukotka (1968), including names of unattested varieties.

Mosquito group

- Miskito - language spoken along the north-eastern coast of Mosquitia, Central America. Dialects are:
  - Kâbô - spoken on the central coast of Mosquitia.
  - Baldam - spoken on the Sandy Bay and near Bimuna.
  - Tawira / Tauira / Tangwera - spoken on the Prinzapolca River.
  - Wanki - spoken on the Coco River and on the Cabo Gracias a Dios.
  - Mam / Cueta - spoken on the left bank of the Wangki River.
  - Chuchure - extinct dialect once spoken around Nombre de Dios, Panama. (Unattested.)
- Ulua / Wulwa / Gaula / Oldwaw / Taulepa - spoken on the Ulúa River and Carca River, Nicaragua.
- Sumu / Simou / Smus / Albauin - spoken on the Prinzapolca River, Nicaragua. Dialects are:
  - Bawihka - spoken on the Banbana River.
  - Tawihka / Táuaxka / Twaca / Taga - spoken between the Coco River and Prinzapolca River.
  - Panamaca - spoken between the Pispis River, Waspuc River, and Bocay River.
  - Cucra / Cockorack - spoken on the Escondido River and Siqui River.
  - Yosco - spoken on the Tuma River and Bocay River. (Unattested.)

Matagalpa group

- Matagalpa / Chontal / Popoluca - extinct language once spoken from the Tumo River to the Olama River, Nicaragua.
- Jinotega / Chingo - extinct language once spoken in the villages of Jinotega and Danlí, Nicaragua. (only several words.)
- Cacaopera - spoken in the villages of Cacaopera and Lislique, El Salvador.

== Proto-language ==
Proto-Misumalpan
- Reconstruction of: Misumalpan languages

Below are Proto-Misumalpan reconstructions by Adolfo Constenla Umaña (1987):

No.	Spanish gloss (original)	English gloss (translated)	Proto-Misumalpan
1	abuela	grandmother	titiŋ
2	abuelo	grandfather	*nini
3	acostarse	lie down	*udaŋ
4	agua	water	*li
5	amarillo	yellow	*lalalh
6	árbol	tree	*ban
7	arena	sand	*kawh
8	atar	tie	*widi
9	ayote	pumpkin	
10	beber	drink (v.)	*di
11	boca	mouth	*ta
12	bueno	good	*jam-
13	búho	owl	*iskidi
14	cantárida	Spanish fly	*mada
15	caracol	snail	*suni
16	caramba	interjection	*anaj
17	casa	house	*u
18	cocer	cook (tr.)	*bja
19	cocerse	cook (intr.)	*wad
20	colibrí	hummingbird	*sud
21	cuarta persona	fourth person	*-ni
22	chica de maíz	corn girl	*sili
23	chile	chile	*kuma
24	dar	give	*a
25	dinero	money	*lihwan
26	dormir	sleep	*jabu
27	dos	two	*bu
28	esposa	wife	*maja
29	estar	to be	*da
30	exhortativo-imperativo plural	plural exhortative-imperative verb	*-naw
31	flecha	arrow	
32	formativo de verbo intransitivo	formative intransitive verb	*-wa
33	gallinácea silvestre	wild fowl	
34	garrapata	tick	*mata
35	garza	heron	*udu
36	guardar	watch (v.)	*ubak
37	guatusa	Dasyprocta punctata	*kjaki
38	gusano	worm	*bid
39	hierro	iron	*jasama
40	humo	smoke	
41	interrogativo	interrogative	*ma
42	interrogativo	interrogative	*ja
43	ir	go	*wa
44	jocote	Spondias purpurea	*wudak
45	lejos	far	*naj
46	lengua	tongue	*tu
47	luna	moon	*wajku
48	llamarse	be called, named	*ajaŋ
49	maíz	corn	*aja
50	maduro	mature	*ahawa
51	matapalo	strangler fig	*laka
52	mentir	lie	*ajlas
53	mujer	woman	*jwada
54	murciélago	bat	*umis
55	nariz	nose	*nam
56	negativo (sufijo verbal)	negative (verbal suffix)	*-san
57	nube	cloud	*amu
58	ocote	Pinus spp.	*kuh
59	oír	hear	*wada
60	oler (intr.)	smell (intr.)	*walab
61	oreja	ear	*tupal
62	orina	urine	*usu
63	perezoso	lazy	*saja
64	pesado	heavy	*wida
65	piedra	stone	*walpa
66	piel	skin	*kutak
67	piojo	louse	
68	pléyades	Pleiades	*kadu
69	podrido	rotten	
70	meter	place, put	*kan
71	pozol	pozol	*sawa
72	presente (sufijo verbal)	present (verbal suffix)	*ta
73	primera persona (sufijo)	first person (suffix)	*-i
74	primera persona (sufijo)	first person (suffix)	*-ki
75	red	net	*wali
76	rodilla	knee	*kadasmak
77	rojo	red	*paw
78	sangre	blood	*a
79	segunda persona (sufijo)	second person (suffix)	*-ma
80	tacaní (tipo de abeja)	tacaní (type of bee)	*walaŋ
81	tepezcuintle (paca)	Cuniculus paca	*uja
82	tercer persona (sufijo)	third person (suffix)	*-ka
83	teta	nipple	*tja
84	teta	nipple	*su
85	tigre	jaguar	
86	tos	cough	*anaŋ
87	tú	you (sg.)	*man
88	verde	green	*saŋ
89	viento	wind	*win
90	yerno	son-in-law	*u
91	yo	I	*jam
92	zacate	grass	*tun
93	zopilote	vulture	*kusma
94	zorro hediondo	skunk	*wasala

== Bibliography ==
- Benedicto, Elena (2002). "Verbal Classifier Systems: The Exceptional Case of Mayangna Auxiliaries". UBC Working Papers in Linguistics. 10: Proceedings of WSCLA 7th: 1–2. S2CID 126222949.
- Benedicto, Elena; Hale, Kenneth (2000). Benedicto, E. (ed.). "Mayangna, A Sumu Language: Its Variants and Its Status within Misumalpa". University of Massachusetts Occasional Papers in Linguistics. 20: 75–106. hdl:20.500.14394/50068.
- Craig, Colette; Hale, Kenneth (1992). "A Possible Macro-Chibchan Etymon". Anthropological Linguistics. 34.
- Constenla Umaña, Adolfo (1987). "Elementos de Fonología Comparada de las Lenguas Misumalpas". Revista de Filología y Lingüística de la Universidad de Costa Rica. 13 (1): 129–161.
- Constenla Umaña A. (1998). "Acerca de la relación genealógica de las lenguas lencas y las lenguas misumalpas," Communication presented at the First Archeological Congress of Nicaragua (Managua, 20–21 July), to appear in 2002 in Revista de Filología y Lingüística de la Universidad de Costa Rica 28 (1).
- Hale, Ken (1996). "El causativo misumalpa (miskitu, sumu)". Anuario del Seminario de Filología Vasca "Julio de Urquijo". 30 (2): 1–2. doi:10.1387/asju.8669.
- Hale, Ken (1991). "Misumalpan Verb Sequencing Constructions". In Lefebvre, C. (ed.). Serial Verbs: Grammatical, Comparative, and Cognitive Approaches. Amsterdam: John Benjamins.
- Hale, Ken; Salamanca, Danilo (2001). "Theoretical and Universal Implications of Certain Verbal Entries in Dictionaries of the Misumalpan Languages". In Frawley; Hill; Munro (eds.). Making Dictionaries: Preserving indigenous Languages of the Americas. University of California Press.
- Koontz-Garboden, Andrew (2009). "Ulwa verb class morphology". International Journal of American Linguistics. 75 (4): 453–512. doi:10.1086/650551. JSTOR 10.1086/650551.
- Rouvier, Ruth (2002). Infixation and reduplication in Misumalpan: A reconstruction (BA thesis). UC Berkeley.
- Young, Phil; Givón, T. (1990). "The puzzle of Ngäbére auxiliaries: Grammatical reconstruction in Chibchan and Misumalpan". In Croft, William; Kemmer, Suzanne; Denning, Keith (eds.). Studies in Typology and Diachrony: Papers presented to Joseph H. Greenberg on his 75th birthday. Typological Studies in Language. Vol. 20. John Benjamins.
