= Length (phonetics) =

Feature of sound based on extended duration

Long

◌ː
- IPA number: 503

Encoding
- Entity (decimal): &#720;
- Unicode (hex): U+02D0
- X-SAMPA: :

Half long

◌ˑ
- IPA number: 504

Encoding
- Entity (decimal): &#721;
- Unicode (hex): U+02D1
- X-SAMPA: :\

Extra long

◌ːˑ

◌ːː

Extra short

◌̆
- IPA number: 505

Encoding
- Entity (decimal): &#774;
- Unicode (hex): U+0306

In phonetics, length or quantity is a feature of sounds that have distinctively extended duration compared with other sounds. There are long vowels as well as long consonants (the latter are often called geminates).

Many languages do not have distinctive length. Among the languages that have distinctive length, there are only a few that have both distinctive vowel length and distinctive consonant length. It is more common that there is only one or that they depend on each other.

The languages that distinguish between different lengths have usually long and short sounds. The Mixe languages are widely considered to have three distinctive levels of vowel length, as do Estonian, some Low German varieties in the vicinity of Hamburg and some Moselle Franconian and Ripuarian Franconian varieties.

Strictly speaking, a pair of a long sound and a short sound should be identical except for their length. In certain languages, however, there are pairs of phonemes that are traditionally considered to be long-short pairs even though they differ not only in length, but also in quality, for instance English "long e" which is /iː/ (as in feet /fiːt/) vs. "short i" which is /ɪ/ (as in fit /fɪt/) or German "long e" which is /eː/ (as in Beet /beːt/ 'garden bed') vs. "short e" which is /ɛ/ (as in Bett /bɛt/ 'sleeping bed'). Also, tonal contour may reinforce the length, as in Estonian, where the over-long length is concomitant with a tonal variation resembling tonal stress marking.

In transcription in the International Phonetic Alphabet, long vowels or consonants are notated with the length sign (ː Unicode U+02D0 MODIFIER LETTER TRIANGULAR COLON) after the letter. Diacritics may occur over either the base letter, the length sign, or both. For example, in some non-rhotic varieties of English the /t/ of the word party may be nearly elided, with just some breathy-voice remaining, in which case it may be transcribed [ˈpɑː̤ɪ]. When both length and tone are moraic, a tone diacritic may appear twice, as in [sáː̀] (falling tone on a long vowel). A morpheme may be reduced to length plus nasalization, in which case a word might be transcribed [saː̃]. If the length is morphemic, the morphemes would be /ː̀/ and /ː̃/.

In this non-linear phonology, the feature of length is often not a feature of a specific sound segment, but rather of the whole syllable.

== See also ==
- Chroneme
- Extra-short
- Colon (letter)
