= Mangue language =

Extinct language of Central America

Mangue
- Chorotega
- Mánekeme
- Native to: Nicaragua, Honduras, Costa Rica, El Salvador
- Ethnicity: Mangue, Chorotega, Monimbo
- Extinct: early 20th century
- Language family: Oto-Mangue: Manguean; Mangue
- Dialects: Dirian; Nagrandan; Choluteca; Orotiña

Language codes
- ISO 639-3: mom
- Glottolog: moni1237
- Mangue

Mangue, also known as Chorotega, is an extinct Oto-Manguean language ancestral to Nicaragua, El Salvador, Honduras and Costa Rica. The dialects were known as: Mangue proper in western Nicaragua, which was further subdivided into Dirian and Nagrandan; Choluteca in the region of Honduras' Bay of Fonseca; and Orotiña in Costa Rica's Nicoya Peninsula.

== Phonology ==
=== Consonants ===
		Labial	Alveolar	Palatal	Velar	Glottal
Plosive	voiceless	p	t		k	
Plosive	prenasal	ᵐb	ⁿd		ᵑɡ	
Affricate			(ts)	(tʃ)		
Fricative			s			h
Nasal		m	n	ɲ		
Flap			ɾ			
Glide		w	l	j		

/t, k/ can have allophones [ts, tʃ].

Stop and fricative sounds /p, t, k, s/ can turn voiced [b, d, ɡ, z] after nasal sounds.

=== Vowels ===
Three vowels are noted /a, i, u/. Suprasegmentals, almost certainly tone given that all extant Oto-Manguean languages are tonal, distinguished certain minimal pairs, but the number of distinct tones is unknown. Allophones are also noted.

Sound	Allophone
/i/	[i], [ɪ], [e]
/a/	[a], [æ], [ɛ]
/u/	[u], [o], [ʊ]

== Grammar ==
This section is based on Rodriguez (2015).

Typologically, Mangue belonged to the Mesoamerican language area as it possessed certain characteristic features such as a vigesimal numeral system. It was dissimilar from neighboring Chibchan and Misumalpan languages. Three main grammatical categories were distinguished: nouns, verbs and particles. Instead of adjectives properly speaking, Mangue had stative verbs.

=== Verbs ===
Verbs took prefixes marking tense/aspect/mood, and suffixes marking person. Uninflected verbs were realis and can correspond to either past or present tense.

Verbal prefixes:

- e-: glossed as imperative, but likely represented present indicative instead based on comparison with Chiapanec
- u-: imperative
- tu-: either past or present
- ta-: glossed variously as future or imperfect. In Chiapanec, this prefix indicated the future.
- m-: possibly indicated the "conjunctive" mood, which indicated either subordination or simultaneity and could be translated as "when".
- a-: appears on some intransitive verbs. In Chiapanec, it indicated the present.

=== Nouns ===
Inalienable nouns took one of three prefixes:

- mb-/nd-/ng-: one possessor - the three were allomorphs, mb- appearing before /a/ and ng- before /u/ or /i/, though there were exceptions. nd- is rarer.
- kupa-: multiple possessors
- n-: no possessor

Number was distinguished by apophony, where a medial /u/ indicated singular, and /i/ plural: nyuri = flower; niri = flowers ngura = foot; ngira = feet nasunyamo = lady; nasinyamo = ladies

=== Personal suffixes ===
These suffixes indicate possession on nouns, and subject on verbs.

- -jo/-ju: first person singular (my; I)
- -ja: second person (singular?) (your; you)
- -me/-mi: third person singular, apparently indicating the subject on intransitive verbs and object on transitive verbs in a form of ergativity

=== Syntax ===
Mangue is a predominantly right-branching or head-initial language. Objects and subjects both appear after the verb, but there is no attested sentence that has both an explicit subject and object. Attributive adjectives follow their noun heads, and possessors follow possessed.

== Phrases ==
Brinton gives a list of Mangue words and phrases, some of which are:

The verb "to be,"

I am, cejo.
Thou art, simuh.
He is, neje sumu.
We are, cis mi muh.

Pronouns.

saho.
My, amba, mba.
He, neje.
She, neja.

Phrases.

Koi murio, It is already dawn.
Koi yujmi, It is already night.
Koi prijpi, It is already growing dark.
Susupusca? How are you?
Ko' mi muya' i ku ? And you, how are you ?
Camo cujmi umyaique, Nasi pujimo camo? There is nothing new; and you, how are you ?
Gusapo, Take a seat
Pami nyumuta, The food is good
Ropia, Come here
Uño I See I
Mis upa'? Where are you going?
Taspo, Yes.
Tapame, Be good.

Brinton also compares the color terms of Mangue and Chiapanec:

Mangue. Chiapanec.

Black, nanzome. dujamä.
White, nandirime. dilimä.
Yellow, nandiume. nandikumä.
Blue or Green nandipame. ndipamä.
Red, arimbome. nduimä.

And a number of Nicaraguan and Costa Rican placenames that come from the Mangue language:

Nindiria (from ninda - shore, diri, hill)
Nakutiri (from naku - fire, diri, hill)
Monimbe (ntimbu - water, rain)
Nandasinmo (nanda - brook)
Mombonasi (nasi - woman)
Masaya
Managua
Namotiva
Norome
Diriamba
Nicoya
Oretina
