= Chroneme =

Distinguishing feature of a sound system by vowel or consonant length

In linguistics, a chroneme is an abstract phonological suprasegmental feature used to signify contrastive differences in the length of speech sounds. Both consonants and vowels can be viewed as displaying this features. The noun chroneme is derived from Ancient Greek χρόνος (khrónos) 'time', and the suffixed ‑eme, which is analogous to the ‑eme in phoneme or morpheme. Two words with different meaning that are spoken exactly the same except for length of one segment are considered a minimal pair. The term was coined by the British phonetician Daniel Jones to avoid using the term phoneme to characterize a feature above the segmental level.

The term is not widely used today, and in the case of English phonetics, Jones' analysis of long and short vowels (e.g. the /iː/ of bead and the /ɪ/ of bit ) as distinguished only by the chroneme is now described as "no longer tenable".

Languages can have differences in length of vowels or consonants, but in most of them these differences are not used phonemically or phonologically as distinctive or contrastive. Even in those languages which do have phonologically contrastive length, a chroneme is only posited in particular languages. Use of a chroneme views /aː/ as being composed of two segments: /a/ and /ː/, whereas in a particular analysis, /aː/ may be considered a single segment with length being one of its features. This may be compared to the analysis of a diphthong like [ai] as a single segment /ai/ or as the sequence of a vowel and consonant: /aj/.

The International Phonetic Alphabet (IPA) denotes length by doubling the letter or by diacritics above or after the letters:

symbol	position	meaning
none	—	short
ː	after	long
ˑ	after	half-long
˘	above	extra-short

== By languages ==
=== English ===
General American English does not have minimal pairs indicating the existence of chronemes or may theoretically be said to have only one chroneme. Some other dialects, such as Australian English, have contrastive vowel length, but it is not analysed as the consequence of a chroneme.

=== Other Indo-European languages ===
Many Indo-European languages, including Classical Latin, have distinctive length in consonants. For example, in Italian:

word	IPA	meaning
vile	/ˈvile/	coward
ville	/ˈville/	villas

or Sicilian:

Sicilian language	IPA	Quality	Etymology	English
A sicunna	/ˌa siˈkunna/	short	(ill)a(m) ("that"/"her")	"the second feminine one"
A sicunna	/ˌassiˈkunna/	long	a(d) ("at"/"to"/etc.)	"depending on"

Distinctive length in vowels may be presented by the cŭ + cū minimal pair in the dialect spoken near Palmi, Calabria (Italy):

Dialect spoken in Palmi	IPA	Quality	Etymology	Latin	English
Cu' voli?	/kuˈvɔːlɪ/	short	cŭ < lat. qui(s) ("who")	Quis vult?	"Who wants?"
Cu' u voli?	/kuːˈvɔːlɪ/	long	cū < lat. qui(s) (ill)ŭ(m) ("what"/"him")	Quis illum vult?	"Who wants him/it?"

=== Uralic languages ===
A number of Uralic languages, such as Finnish, Hungarian and Estonian have a distinctive moraic chroneme as a phoneme (also arguably called archiphoneme). For example, taka- "back-", takka "fireplace" and taakka "burden" are unrelated words. It is also grammatically important; the third person marker is a chroneme (menee "s/he goes"), and often in the spoken Finnish of the Helsinki area there are grammatical minimal pairs, e.g. nominative Stadi "Helsinki" vs. partitive Stadii.

In Finnish, Estonian and Sami languages, there are also two allophonic lengths of the chroneme, half-long and over-long. For example, Finnish imperative anna! "give!" has a short vowel, oma "own" has a half-long vowel, and Annaa (partitive case of the name Anna) has an overlong vowel (without any distinctive tonal variation to distinguish these three). Estonian and Sami also have a three-way distinction in consonants, e.g. lina "bed sheet", linna (half-long 'n') "of the city", linna (over-long 'n') "to the city". Estonian, in which the phonemic opposition is the strongest, uses tonal contour as a secondary cue to distinguish the two; "over-long" is falling as in other Finnic languages, but "half-long" is rising.

Finnish also denotes stress principally by adding more length (approximately 100 ms) to the vowel of the syllable nucleus. This means that Finnish has five different physical lengths. (The half-long vowel is a phonemically short vowel appearing in the second syllable, if the first—and thus stressed—syllable is a single short vowel.) The unstressed short vowels are about 40 ms in physical duration, the unstressed long vowels about 70 ms. The stress adds about 100 ms, giving short stressed as 130–150 ms and long stressed as 170–180 ms. The half-long vowel, which is always short unstressed, is distinctively longer than the standard 40 ms.

=== Japanese ===
Japanese is another language in which vowel length is distinctive. For example, biru is a foreign loan word (clipped from a longer form) that means "building" whereas bīru is a foreign loan word for "beer". Using a notion intuitive to a speaker of Japanese, it could be said that more than anything, what differentiates bīru from biru is an extra mora (or minimal vowel syllable) in the speech rhythm that signifies a lengthening of the vowel [i]. However, upon observation one might also note a rise in pitch and intensity of the longer vowel. It could be said, also, that vowel lengthening—chronemic contrasts—nearly doubles Japanese's rather small inventory of vowel phonemes (though the occurrence of diphthongs also augments vowel counts). Due to native literacy practices, Japanese long vowels are often thought of as sequences of two vowels of the same quality (rather than one vowel of a greater quantity or length) since that is how they are sometimes written.

In the case of consonants of Japanese, if treated phonemically, a medial consonant might appear to double, thus creating a contrast, for example, between the word hiki (meaning 'pull' or 'influence') and hikki (meaning 'writing'). In terms of articulation and phonetics, the difference between the two words would be that, in the latter hikki, the doubled [kk] closes the first syllable [hi-] and is realized in the glottis as glottal plosive stop (with some anticipatory articulation evident in the velum of the mouth, where a /k/ is usually made) while starting the next syllable [‑ki] as a [k] articulated and realized as the regular velar sound. In effect, this consonant doubling then adds one mora to the overall speech rhythm and timing. Hence, among other contrasts, the word hik-ki is felt to be one mora or beat longer than hi-ki by a speaker of Japanese.

=== Thai ===
Thai has distinctive length in vowels. For example:

word	IPA	RTGS	quality	meaning
เข้า	/kʰâw/	khâo	short	enter
ข้าว	/kʰâːw/	khâo	long	rice

== See also ==
- Emic and etic – Two kinds of anthropologic field research
- Morpheme – Smallest lexical item in a language
- Phoneme – Basic unit of phonology

== Bibliography ==
- Suomi, Kari. Temporal conspiracies for a tonal end: Segmental durations and accentual f0 movement in a quantity language. Journal of Phonetics, Volume 33, Issue 3, July 2005, pp. 291–309.
- Phonetics of Finnish: Quantity and duration of vowels & consonants
