= Emic and etic units =

Abstract object analyzed in linguistics

In linguistics and related fields, an emic unit is a type of abstract object. Kinds of emic units are generally denoted by terms with the suffix -eme, such as phoneme, grapheme, and morpheme. The term "emic unit" is defined by Nöth (1995) to mean "an invariant form obtained from the reduction of a class of variant forms to a limited number of abstract units". The variant forms are called etic units (from phonetic). This means that a given emic unit is considered to be a single underlying object that may have a number of different observable "surface" representations.

The various etic units that represent a given emic unit of a certain kind are denoted by a corresponding term with the prefix allo- (other, different), such as allophone, allograph, and allomorph.

== History and terminology ==
The first emic unit to be considered, in the late 19th century, was the phoneme. The word phoneme comes from the Greek: φώνημα, phōnēma, meaning "that which is sounded", from the verb φωνέω (phōneō, 'sound'), which comes in turn from the noun φωνή (phōnē, 'sound'). Thus it was originally used (in its French form phonème) to refer simply to a speech sound. But it soon came to be used in its modern sense: to denote an abstract concept. (Note: for more details, see Phoneme: Background and related ideas) It is by analogy with phoneme that other emic units, such as the morpheme and the grapheme, were named using the -eme suffix. The actual terms "emic unit" and "etic unit" were introduced in 1954 by Kenneth Pike.

The prefix allo- used in terms such as allophone is from the Ancient Greek: ἄλλος (allos, 'other'). This prefix is also used in chemistry.

== Examples in linguistics ==
The following are the most commonly analyzed kinds of emic units in linguistics:

- A phoneme is an underlying object whose surface representations are phones (speech sounds); different phones representing the same phoneme are called allophones of that phoneme. The choice of allophone may be dependent on the phonological context (neighboring sounds), or may be subject to free variation.
- A morpheme is an underlying object whose surface representations are meaningful fragments of language; different fragments representing the same morpheme are called allomorphs of that morpheme.
- A grapheme is an underlying object whose surface representations are graphs (written symbols) [Meletis & Dürscheid, 2022]; different graphs representing the same grapheme are called allographs of that grapheme (the term glyph is used in computing, as a synonym of graph).

Other examples of emic units in various branches of linguistics include the lexeme, grammeme, toneme, chereme, sememe, and tagmeme.

== Generalizations outside linguistics ==
In linguistics a distinction is made between so-called "emic" and "etic" accounts. For example a phonemic description is one expressed in terms of phonemes, whereas a phonetic one is based on the phones actually produced. This distinction was generalized by Pike (1954) and is applied in various social and behavioral sciences. In this general sense, an emic account is one that assumes insider knowledge of a phenomenon (as for example the unconscious awareness of a language's phonemic system that is assumed to be possessed by that language's native speakers). By contrast, an etic account is one based on the observations of an outsider.

== See also ==
- Ideologeme (in sociology, a unit in ideological analysis)
- Meme (acts as a unit for carrying cultural ideas, symbols, or practices)
- Mytheme (in mythology, basic narratological/mythological unit)
- Narreme (in narratology, basic narratological unit)
- Ludeme (in games, basic unit of play)
- Segment (linguistics)

== Sources ==
- Pike, Kenneth Lee (1967) [1954]. Language in relation to a unified theory of the structure of human behavior. Vol. 1 (2nd ed.). Mouton. OCLC 979752361.
- Brainerd, Barron (1971). Introduction to the mathematics of language study. Elsevier. pp. 136, ff. ISBN 9780444000712.
- Meletis, Dimitrios; Dürscheid, Christa (2022). Writing Systems and Their Use. De Gruyter Mouton. pp. x, 318. ISBN 978-3-11-075783-5.
- Nöth, Winfried (1995). Handbook of Semiotics. Indiana University Press. pp. 183, ff. ISBN 0253209595.
