= Grammatical category =

Property of items within the grammar of a language

In linguistics, a grammatical category or grammatical feature is a property of items within the grammar of a language. Within each category there are two or more possible values (sometimes called grammemes), which are normally mutually exclusive. Frequently encountered grammatical categories include:

- Case, varying according to the relations between the participants in an action (e.g. subject, object, possession, direction, accompaniment etc.).
- Noun classes, such as gender, animacy, and so on.
- Number, varying according to the number of things (e.g. singular or plural).
- Tense, varying according to when an action takes place (e.g. present, past or future).
- Aspect, varying according to the state of an action in relation to time (e.g. completed, ongoing, repeated, habitual etc.).
- Mood and modality, varying according to the speaker's attitude towards an action and its relation to reality (e.g. statement of fact, hypothetical, questioning, ordering, suggesting etc.).
- Voice, varying according to the role taken by each participant in an action (e.g. active or passive).

Although the use of terms varies from author to author, a distinction should be made between grammatical categories and lexical categories. Lexical categories (considered syntactic categories) largely correspond to the parts of speech of traditional grammar, and refer to nouns, adjectives, etc.

A phonological manifestation of a category value (for example, a word ending that marks "number" on a noun) is sometimes called an exponent.

Grammatical relations define relationships between words and phrases with certain parts of speech, depending on their position in the syntactic tree. Traditional relations include subject, object, and indirect object.

== Assignment and meaning ==
A given constituent of an expression can normally take only one value in each category. For example, a noun or noun phrase cannot be both singular and plural, since these are both values of the "number" category. It can, however, be both plural and feminine, since these represent different categories (number and gender).

Categories may be described and named with regard to the type of meanings that they are used to express. For example, the category of tense usually expresses the time of occurrence (e.g. past, present or future). However, purely grammatical features do not always correspond simply or consistently to elements of meaning, and different authors may take significantly different approaches in their terminology and analysis. For example, the meanings associated with the categories of tense, aspect and mood are often bound up in verb conjugation patterns that do not have separate grammatical elements corresponding to each of the three categories; see Tense–aspect–mood.

== Manifestation of categories ==
Categories may be marked on words by means of inflection. In English, for example, the number of a noun is usually marked by leaving the noun uninflected if it is singular, and by adding the suffix -s if it is plural (although some nouns have irregular plural forms). On other occasions, a category may not be marked overtly on the item to which it pertains, being manifested only through other grammatical features of the sentence, often by way of grammatical agreement.

For example:

The bird can sing.
The birds can sing.

In the above sentences, the number of the noun is marked by the absence or presence of the ending -s.

The sheep is running.
The sheep are running.

In the above, the number of the noun is not marked on the noun itself (sheep does not inflect according to the regular pattern), but it is reflected in agreement between the noun and verb: singular number triggers is, and plural number are.

The bird is singing.
The birds are singing.

In this case the number is marked overtly on the noun, and is also reflected by verb agreement.

However:

The sheep can run.

In this case the number of the noun (or of the verb) is not manifested at all in the surface form of the sentence, and thus ambiguity is introduced (at least, when the sentence is viewed in isolation).

Exponents of grammatical categories often appear in the same position or "slot" in the word (such as prefix, suffix or enclitic). An example of this is the Latin cases, which are all suffixal: rosa, rosae, rosae, rosam, rosa, rosā ("rose", in the nominative, genitive, dative, accusative, vocative and ablative).

Categories can also pertain to sentence constituents that are larger than a single word (phrases, or sometimes clauses). A phrase often inherits category values from its head word; for example, in the above sentences, the noun phrase the birds inherits plural number from the noun birds. In other cases such values are associated with the way in which the phrase is constructed; for example, in the coordinated noun phrase Tom and Mary, the phrase has plural number (it would take a plural verb), even though both the nouns from which it is built up are singular.

== Grammatical category of noun ==
In traditional structural grammar, grammatical categories are semantic distinctions; this is reflected in a morphological or syntactic paradigm. But in generative grammar, which sees meaning as separate from grammar, they are categories that define the distribution of syntactic elements. For structuralists such as Roman Jakobson grammatical categories were lexemes that were based on binary oppositions of "a single feature of meaning that is equally present in all contexts of use". Another way to define a grammatical category is as a category that expresses meanings from a single conceptual domain, contrasts with other such categories, and is expressed through formally similar expressions. Another definition distinguishes grammatical categories from lexical categories, such that the elements in a grammatical category have a common grammatical meaning – that is, they are part of the language's grammatical structure.

== See also ==
- Grammatical relation
- Grammeme
- Syntax
