= Tagmeme =

Grammatical unit

A tagmeme is the smallest functional element in the grammatical structure of a language. The term was introduced in the 1930s by the linguist Leonard Bloomfield, who defined it as the smallest meaningful unit of grammatical form (analogous to the morpheme, defined as the smallest meaningful unit of lexical form). The term was later adopted, and its meaning broadened, by Kenneth Pike and others beginning in the 1950s, as the basis for their tagmemics.

== Bloomfield's scheme ==
According to the scheme set out by Leonard Bloomfield in his book Language (1933), the tagmeme is the smallest meaningful unit of grammatical form. A tagmeme consists of one or more taxemes, where a taxeme is a primitive grammatical feature, in the same way that a phoneme is a primitive phonological feature. Taxemes and phonemes do not as a rule have meaning on their own, but combine into tagmemes and morphemes respectively, which carry meaning.

For example, an utterance such as "John runs" is a concrete example of a tagmeme (an allotagm) whose meaning is that an actor performs an action. The taxemes making up this tagmeme include the selection of a nominative expression, the selection of a finite verb expression, and the ordering of the two such that the nominative expression precedes the finite verb expression.

Bloomfield makes the taxeme and tagmeme part of a system of emic units:

- The smallest (and meaningless, when taken by itself) unit of linguistic signaling is the pheneme; this may be either lexical (phoneme) or grammatical (taxeme).
- The smallest meaningful unit of linguistic signaling is the glosseme, either lexical (morpheme) or grammatical (tagmeme).
- The meaning of a glosseme is a noeme, the meaning of either a morpheme (sememe) or a tagmeme (episememe).

More generally, he defines any meaningful unit of linguistic signaling (not necessarily smallest) as a linguistic form, and its meaning as a linguistic meaning; it may be either a lexical form (with a lexical meaning) or a grammatical form (with a grammatical meaning).

== Pike and tagmemics ==
Bloomfield's term was adopted by Kenneth Pike and others to denote what they had previously been calling the grammeme (earlier grameme). In Pike's approach, consequently called tagmemics, the hierarchical organization of levels (e.g. in syntax: word, phrase, sentence, paragraph, discourse) results from the fact that the elements of a tagmeme on a higher level (e.g. 'sentence') are analyzed as syntagmemes on the next lower level (e.g. 'phrase').

The tagmeme is the correlation of a syntagmatic function (e.g. subject, object) and paradigmatic fillers (e.g. nouns, pronouns or proper nouns as possible fillers of the subject position). Tagmemes combine to form a syntagmeme, a syntactic construction consisting of a sequence of tagmemes.

Tagmemics as a linguistic methodology was developed by Pike in his book Language in Relation to a Unified Theory of the Structure of Human Behavior, 3 vol. (1954–1960). It was primarily designed to assist linguists to efficiently extract coherent descriptions out of corpora of fieldwork data. Tagmemics is particularly associated with the early work of the Summer Institute of Linguistics, an association of missionary linguists devoted largely to Bible translations, of which Pike was an early member.

Tagmemics makes the kind of distinction made between phone and phoneme in phonology and phonetics at higher levels of linguistic analysis (grammatical and semantic); for instance, contextually conditioned synonyms are considered different instances of a single tagmeme, as sounds which are (in a given language) contextually conditioned are allophones of a single phoneme. The emic and etic distinction also applies in other social sciences.

== Bibliography ==
- Cook, Walter Anthony (1969), Introduction to tagmemic analysis, Transatlantic series in linguistics, New York: Holt, Rinehart and Winston, ISBN 978-0-03-077115-6
- Longacre, Robert E. (1965), "Some Fundamental Insights of Tagmemics", Language, vol. 41, no. 1, pp. 65–76, ISSN 0097-8507, JSTOR 411852
- Pike, Kenneth L. (2015) [1967], Language in Relation to a Unified Theory of the Structure of Human Behavior, Walter de Gruyter, ISBN 978-3-11-165715-8
- ——— (1982), Linguistic concepts: an introduction to tagmemics, Lincoln: University of Nebraska Press, ISBN 978-0-8032-3664-6
- Trask, Robert L. (2003) [1993], A dictionary of grammatical terms in linguistics, London: Routledge, ISBN 978-0-415-07809-2
- Waterhouse, Viola G. (1974), The History and Development of Tagmemics, Janua Linguarum. Series Critica, vol. 16, Mouton, ISBN 978-3-110-99501-5
