= Graphetics =

Study of written graphs independent of language

Graphetics is a branch of grapholinguistics concerned with the analysis of the physical properties of shapes used in writing.

It is an etic study, meaning that it has an outsider's perspective and is not concerned with any particular writing system. It is contrasted with the related emic field of graphemics, the study of the relation between different shapes in particular writing systems. Graphetics is analogous to phonetics; graphetics is to the study of writing as phonetics is to the study of spoken language. As such, it can be divided into two areas, visual graphetics and mechanical graphetics, which are analogous to auditory and articulatory phonetics, respectively. Both printed and handwritten language can be the subject of graphetic study.
