= Voiceless alveolar fricative =

Consonantal sound often represented by ⟨s⟩ in IPA

Voiceless alveolar sibilant

s
- IPA number: 132

Audio sample
- source · help

Encoding
- Entity (decimal): &#115;
- Unicode (hex): U+0073
- X-SAMPA: s
- Braille: ⠎ (braille pattern dots-234)
Image

Voiceless alveolar fricatives are a type of fricative consonant pronounced with the tip or blade of the tongue against the alveolar ridge (gum line) just behind the teeth. This refers to a class of sounds, not a single sound. There are at least five types with significant perceptual differences:

- A voiceless alveolar sibilant [s] (the standard symbol in the International Phonetic Alphabet or IPA) has a strong hissing sound, as the s in English sink. It is one of the most common sounds in the world.
- A voiceless denti-alveolar sibilant [s̟] or [s̄] (an ad hoc notation), also called apico-dental, has a weaker lisping sound like English th in thin. It occurs in Spanish dialects in southern Spain (eastern Andalusia).
- A voiceless alveolar retracted sibilant [s̠], and the subform apico-alveolar [s̺], has a weak hushing sound (also called "grave" frication) reminiscent of retroflex fricatives. It is used in the languages of northern Iberia, like Asturleonese, Basque, Peninsular Spanish (excluding parts of Andalusia), Catalan, Galician, and Northern European Portuguese. A similar retracted sibilant form is also used in Dutch, Icelandic, some southern dialects of Swedish, Finnish, and Greek. The retracted "S" is also used in Amerindian languages such as Muscogee, Garifuna, and many varieties of Quechua. It was supposedly the standard sound of s in Classical Latin. Its sound is between [s] and [ʃ].
- A voiceless alveolar non-sibilant fricative [θ̠] or [θ͇] (using the alveolar diacritic from the Extended IPA) is similar to the th in English thin. It occurs in Icelandic as well as an intervocalic and word-final allophone of English /t/ in dialects such as Hiberno-English and Scouse.
- A voiceless alveolar lateral fricative [ɬ] sounds like a voiceless, strongly articulated version of English l (somewhat like what the English cluster **hl would sound like) and is written as ll in Welsh.

The first three types are sibilants, meaning that they are made by directing a stream of air with the tongue towards the teeth and have a piercing, perceptually prominent sound.

Voiceless coronal fricatives
	Inter- dental	Dental	Denti- alveolar	Alveolar	Post-alveolar			
	Inter- dental	Dental	Denti- alveolar	Alveolar	Retracted	Retroflex	Palato- alveolar	Alveolo- palatal
Sibilant		s̪	s̟	s͇	s̠	ʂ	ʃ	ɕ
Non-sibilant	θ̟	θ	θ̠	θ͇		ɻ̝̊	ɹ̠̊˔	

== Voiceless alveolar sibilant ==
A voiceless alveolar sibilant is a common consonant sound in spoken languages. It is the sound in English words such as sea and pass, and is represented in the International Phonetic Alphabet with ⟨s⟩. It has a characteristic high-pitched, highly perceptible hissing sound. For this reason, it is often used to get someone's attention, using a call often written as sssst! or psssst!.

Voiceless alveolar sibilants [s] are one of the most common sounds cross-linguistically. If a language has fricatives, it will most likely have [s]. However, some languages have a related sibilant sound, such as [ʃ], but no [s]. In addition, sibilants are absent from most Australian Aboriginal languages, in which fricatives are rare; however, [s] does occur in Kalaw Lagaw Ya.

=== Features ===
Features of a voiceless alveolar sibilant:

- Its manner of articulation is sibilant (a subclass of fricatives and affricates), which means it is generally produced with a higher-frequency turbulence. Sibilants may be articulated with various tongue shapes and degrees of palatalization, depending on their place of articulation.
- There are at least three specific variants of [s]:
  - Dentalized laminal alveolar (commonly called "dental"), which means it is articulated with the tongue blade very close to the upper front teeth, with the tongue tip resting behind lower front teeth. The hissing effect in this variety of [s] is very strong.
  - Non-retracted alveolar, which means it is articulated with either the tip or the blade of the tongue at the alveolar ridge, termed respectively apical and laminal. According to Ladefoged & Maddieson (1996) about half of English speakers use a non-retracted apical articulation.
  - Retracted alveolar, which means it is articulated with either the tip or the blade of the tongue slightly behind the alveolar ridge, termed respectively apical and laminal. Acoustically, it is close to laminal [ʂ] or (to a lesser extent) [ʃ].
- Its phonation is voiceless, which means it is produced without vibrations of the vocal cords. In some languages the vocal cords are actively separated, so it is always voiceless; in others the cords are lax, so that it may take on the voicing of adjacent sounds.
- It is an oral consonant, which means that air is not allowed to escape through the nose.
- It is a median consonant, which means it is produced by directing the airstream down the midline of the tongue, rather than to the sides.
- Its airstream mechanism is pulmonic, which means it is articulated by pushing air only with the intercostal muscles and abdominal muscles, as in most speech sounds.

=== Occurrence ===
==== Dentalized laminal alveolar ====
Voiceless dental sibilant

s̪

Audio sample
- source · help

Language		Word	IPA	Meaning	Notes
Acehnese		seuôt	[s̻̪ɯˈʔot̠̚]	'to answer'	Described by Durie as a "laminal alveo-dental fricative with a wide channel area". Often desibilized into [θ] in the Greater Aceh dialect. See Acehnese phonology
Arabic	Gulf	مسجد (masjid)	[mɐˈs̪d͡ʒɪd̪]	'mosque'	
Armenian	Eastern	սար (sar)	[s̪ɑɾ]	'mountain'	
Azerbaijani		su	[s̪u]	'water'	
Belarusian		стагоддзе (stağoddzě)	[s̪t̪äˈɣod̪d̪͡z̪ʲe]	'century'	Contrasts with palatalized form. See Belarusian phonology
Bulgarian		всеки (vseki)	[ˈfs̪ɛkʲi]	'everyone'	Contrasts with palatalized form.
Chinese	Mandarin	三 (sān)	[s̪a̋n]	'three'	See Mandarin phonology
Chuvash		савăт (savët)	[s̪aʋət]	'vessel, glass'	
English	Auckland	sand	[s̪ɛnˑd̥]	'sand'	See English phonology
English	Multicultural London	sand	[s̪anˑd̥]	'sand'	See English phonology
French		façade	[fäs̪äd̪]	'front'	See French phonology
Hungarian		sziget	[ˈs̪iɡɛt̪]	'island'	See Hungarian phonology
Italian	Standard	sali	[ˈsäːli]	'you go up'	Varies between dentalized laminal and non-retracted apical. See Italian phonology
Italian	Ticino	sali	[ˈsäːli]	'you go up'	Varies between dentalized laminal and non-retracted apical. Both variants may be labiodentalized. See Italian phonology
Kashubian		sus	[ˈsus]	'ground squirrel'	
Kazakh		сары (sary)	[s̪ɑɾə]	'yellow'	
Kyrgyz		сабиз (sabiz)	[s̪äˈbis̪]	'carrot'	
Latvian		sens	[s̪æn̪s̪]	'ancient'	See Latvian phonology
Macedonian		скока (skoka)	[ˈs̪kɔkä]	'jump'	See Macedonian phonology
Mirandese		sangre	[s̺ɐ̃(ŋ)ɡɾe]	'blood'	Contrasts seven sibilants altogether, preserving medieval Ibero-Romance contrasts.
Norwegian	Urban East	sand	[sɑnː]	'sand'	Most often dentalized laminal, but can be non-retracted apical for some speakers. See Norwegian phonology
Polish		sum	[s̪um]	'catfish'	See Polish phonology
Romanian		surd	[s̪ur̪d̪]	'deaf'	See Romanian phonology
Russian		волосы (volosy)	[ˈvo̞ɫ̪əs̪ɨ̞]	'hair'	Contrasts with palatalized form. See Russian phonology
Scottish Gaelic		slàinte	[ˈs̪ɫ̪äːn̪t̪ʰʲə]	'cheers'	See Scottish Gaelic phonology
Serbo-Croatian		село (selo)	[s̪ĕ̞lo̞]	'village'	See Serbo-Croatian phonology
Slovak		sto	[stɔ]	'hundred'	See Slovak phonology
Slovene		svet	[s̪ʋêːt̪]	'world'	See Slovene phonology
Spanish	Andalusian	casa	[ˈkäs̻̪ä]	'house'	Present in dialects with ceceo. See Spanish phonology
Spanish	Iberian	estar	[e̞s̪ˈt̪äɾ]	'to be'	Allophone of /s/ before dental consonants. See Spanish phonology
Swedish	Central Standard	säte	[ˈs̪ɛːt̪ə]	'seat'	Retracted in some southern dialects. See Swedish phonology
Toda		[kɔs̪]		'money'	Contrasts /θ s̪ s̠ ʃ ʂ/. Voiced allophones are found in fast speech.
Turkish		su	[s̪u]	'water'	See Turkish phonology
Ukrainian		село (selo)	[s̪ɛˈɫ̪ɔ]	'village'	Contrasts with palatalized form. See Ukrainian phonology
Upper Sorbian		sowa	[ˈs̪owä]	'owl'	
Uzbek		soät	[ˈs̪o̞æt̪]	'hour'	
Vietnamese	Hanoi	xa	[s̪äː]	'far'	See Vietnamese phonology

==== Alveolar ====
Language		Word	IPA	Meaning	Notes
Adyghe		сэ (sė)	[sa]	'I'	
Arabic	Modern Standard	جَلَس (ǧalasa)	[ˈdʒælæsɐ]	'to sit'	See Arabic phonology
Assyrian		ܣܝܦܐ (sèpa)	[seːpaː]	'sword'	
Bengali		রাস্তা (rasta)	[raːst̪a]	'street'	See Bengali phonology
Breton		spered	[ˈspered]	'spirit'	
Burmese		စခန်း (ca.hkan:)	[sə kʰáɰ̃]	'camp'	
Chechen		сурт (surt)	[suʊrt]	'picture'	
Chinese	Cantonese	閃 (sim2)	[siːm˧˥]	'twinkle'	See Cantonese phonology
Czech		svět	[svjɛt]	'world'	See Czech phonology
Danish		sælge	[ˈseljə]	'sell'	Most often non-retracted apical, but can be dentalized laminal for some speakers. See Danish phonology
Dutch	Belgian Standard	scheepvaart	[ˈsxeːˌp̪͡faˑrt]	'navigation'	Laminal. See Dutch phonology
Dutch	Northern Standard	scheepvaart	[ˈsχep̪ˌfaˑɾtʰ]	'navigation'	Laminal. It is laxer than in English, has a graver frication and is sometimes labialized. It is often retracted when preconsonantal, after rounded vowels and /r/. See Dutch phonology
Emilian		sèl	[ˈs̺ʲɛːl]	'salt'	Palatalized apical; may be [ʂ] or [ʃ] instead.
English		sit	[sɪʔtʰ]	'sit'	See English phonology
Esperanto		Esperanto	[espeˈranto]	'Who hopes'	See Esperanto phonology
Faroese		sandur	[sandʊɹ]	'sand'	
German	Standard	Biss	[bɪs]	'bite'	Varies between dentalized laminal, non-retracted laminal and non-retracted apical. See Standard German phonology
Georgian		სამი (sami)	[ˈsɑmi]	'three'	
Hebrew		ספר (sefer)	[ˈsefeʁ]	'book'	See Modern Hebrew phonology
Hindustani		साल / سال (sāl)	[säːl]	'year'	See Hindustani phonology
Italian	Standard	sali	[ˈsäːli]	'you go up'	Varies between dentalized laminal and non-retracted apical. See Italian phonology
Italian	Ticino	sali	[ˈsäːli]	'you go up'	Varies between dentalized laminal and non-retracted apical. Both variants may be labiodentalized. See Italian phonology
Japanese		複数形 (fukusūkē)	[ɸɯkɯ̊sɯːkeː]	'plural'	See Japanese phonology
Kabardian		сэ (sė)	[sa]	'I'	
Karen	S'gaw Karen	စ့ၤ(sə̄)	[sē]	'silver'	
Karen	Western Pwo	စဲၪ့(sai)	[sàiɴ]	'to run'	
Katë		su	[su]	'sun'	
Khmer		អេស្ប៉ាញ (éspanh)	[ʔeːˈspaːɲ]	noun: 'Spain' adjective: 'Spanish'	See Khmer phonology
Khmer		ម៉ាស៊ីន (masin)	[maːˈsiːn]	'machine'	See Khmer phonology
Korean		섬 (seom)	[sʌːm]	'island'	See Korean phonology
Malay		satu	[satu]	'one'	
Malayalam		സ്വപ്നം (svapnaṁ)	[sʋəpɨn̪əm]	'dream'	See Malayalam phonology
Maltese		iebes	[eaˈbes]	'hard'	
Marathi		साप (sāp)	[säːp]	'snake'	See Marathi phonology
Nepali		सगरमाथा (sagarmāthā)	[sʌɡʌrmät̪ʰä]	'Mount Everest'	See Nepali phonology
Odia		ସମାନ(samāna)	[sɔmänɔ]	'equal'	
Occitan	Limousin	maichent	[mejˈsẽ]	'bad'	
Persian		سیب (sib)	[sib]	'apple'	See Persian phonology
Portuguese		caço	[ˈkasu]	'I hunt'	See Portuguese phonology
Punjabi		ਸੱਪ (sapp)	[səpː]	'snake'	
Spanish	Latin American	saltador	[s̻a̠l̪t̪a̠ˈð̞o̞r]	'jumper'	See Spanish phonology and Seseo
Spanish	Canarian	saltador	[s̻a̠l̪t̪a̠ˈð̞o̞r]	'jumper'	See Spanish phonology and Seseo
Spanish	Andalusian	saltador	[s̻a̠l̪t̪a̠ˈð̞o̞r]	'jumper'	See Spanish phonology and Seseo
Spanish	Filipino	saltador	[s̻a̠l̪t̪a̠ˈð̞o̞r]	'jumper'	See Spanish phonology and Seseo
Swahili		Kiswahili	[kiswaˈhili]	'Swahili'	
Sylheti		ꠢꠂꠍꠦ (oise)	[ɔise]	'done'	
Tagalog		lasa	[ˈlasɐ]	'taste'	
Tamil		சாப்பிடு (sāppidu)	[saːpːɪɖɯ]	'to eat'	See Tamil phonology
Ticino					Varies between dentalized laminal and non-retracted apical. Both variants may be labiodentalized. See Italian phonology
Toki Pona		suwi	[suwi]	'sweet'	Varies. See Toki Pona phonology
Vietnamese		xa	[saː˧]	'far'	See Vietnamese phonology
Yi		ꌦ (sy)	[sɹ̩˧]	'die'	

==== Retracted alveolar ====
Voiceless retracted alveolar sibilant

s̠

s̺

Audio sample
- source · help

Language		Word	IPA	Meaning	Notes
Asturian		pasu	[ˈpäs̺u]	'step'	Apical.
Basque		su	[s̺u]	'fire'	Apical. Contrasts with a dentalized laminal sibilant.
Catalan	Most dialects	set	[ˈs̺ɛt̪]	'seven'	Apical. See Catalan phonology
Catalan	Central Valencian	zel	[ˈs̺æ̠ɫ]	'zeal'	Apical. Devoiced allophone of /z/ in parts of Central Valencian and Eastern Aragon. See Catalan phonology
Catalan	Central Valencian	utilitzar	[u̞t̪i̞ɫi̞ˈs̺ɑɾ]	'to use'	Apical. Deaffrication of /d͡z/ and devoiced allophone found in parts of Central Valencian and Eastern Aragon. See Catalan phonology
Catalan	Some Valencian speakers	ix	[ˈis̠]	'he/she goes out'	Realized as pre-palatal /ʃ/ [ɕ] (or /jʃ/ [jɕ] in certain cases in some dialects) in Standard Catalan and Valencian. See Catalan phonology
Dutch	Netherlandic speakers	sik	[ˈs̠ɪkʰ]	'goatee'	Laminal and on the lax end of articulation spectrum. Can be labialized. If retracted is not the main allophone, may appear as such when preconsonantal, after rounded vowels and /r/. See Dutch phonology
English	Glasgow	sun	[s̺ʌn]	'sun'	Working-class pronunciation, other speakers may use a non-retracted [s]
Emilian		sèinpar	[ˈs̠æ̃.pər]	'always'	
Estonian		sõna	[ˈsɤnɑ]	'word'	
Finnish		sinä	[ˈsinæ]	'you'	Varies between non-retracted and retracted. See Finnish phonology
Galician		saúde	[s̺äˈuðe]	'health'	Apical.
Greek		Κωνσταντινούπολις (Kōnstantinoúpolis)	[ko̞nᵗstɐndi ˈn̠uˑpo̞lis̠ː]	'Constantinople'	Varies between non-retracted and retracted, depending on the environment. See Modern Greek phonology
Icelandic		USSS	[ˈʔʏ̠s̠ː]	'(initialism) USSS'	Usually apical, can alternatively be laminal. See Icelandic phonology
Italian	Central Italy	sali	[ˈs̠äːli]	'you go up'	Present in Lazio north of Cape Linaro, most of Umbria (save Perugia and the extreme south), Marche and south of Potenza.
Italian	Northern Italy	sali	[ˈs̠äːli]	'you go up'	Apical. Present in many areas north of the La Spezia–Rimini Line. Derived from local languages of northern Italy. See Italian phonology
Italian	Sicily	sali	[ˈs̠äːli]	'you go up'	Present south and west of a line drawn from Syracuse to Cefalù.
Leonese		pasu	[ˈpäs̺ʊ]	'step'	Apical.
Low German					
Mirandese		passo	[ˈpäs̺u]	'step'	Apical. Contrasts with /s̪/.
Occitan	Gascon	dos	[d̻ys̺]	'two'	See Occitan phonology
Occitan	Languedocien	dos	[d̻us̺]	'two'	See Occitan phonology
Piedmontese		sapin	[s̠apiŋ]	'pine'	Apical.
Portuguese	European, inland northern	cansaço	[kɐ̃ˈs̺as̻u]	'weariness'	Apical. Contrasts with /s̻/. See Portuguese phonology
Portuguese	European, coastal northern	cansaço	[kɐ̃ˈs̺as̺u]	'weariness'	Merges with /s̻/. See Portuguese phonology
Portuguese	Inland and southern Capixaba	pescador	[pe̞s̺käˈd̻oχ]	'fisherman'	Realization of Portuguese coda sibilant, which may be postalveolars, depending on dialect
Portuguese	Carioca do brejo	escadas	[is̺ˈkäd̻ɐs̺]	'stairs'	Realization of Portuguese coda sibilant, which may be postalveolars, depending on dialect
Spanish	Andean	saltador	[s̺äl̪t̪äˈð̞o̞ɾ]	'jumper'	Apical. In Andean and Paisa (except in southern parts of Antioquia) alternates with a more frequent coronal-dental /s/. See Spanish phonology and seseo
Spanish	Castilian	saltador	[s̺äl̪t̪äˈð̞o̞ɾ]	'jumper'	Apical. In Andean and Paisa (except in southern parts of Antioquia) alternates with a more frequent coronal-dental /s/. See Spanish phonology and seseo
Spanish	Paisa accent	saltador	[s̺äl̪t̪äˈð̞o̞ɾ]	'jumper'	Apical. In Andean and Paisa (except in southern parts of Antioquia) alternates with a more frequent coronal-dental /s/. See Spanish phonology and seseo
Swedish	Blekinge	säte	[ˈs̠ɛːte]	'seat'	See Swedish phonology
Swedish	Bohuslän	säte	[ˈs̠ɛːte]	'seat'	See Swedish phonology
Swedish	Halland	säte	[ˈs̠ɛːte]	'seat'	See Swedish phonology
Swedish	Scania	säte	[ˈs̠ɛːte]	'seat'	See Swedish phonology
Toda		[poːs̠]		'milk'	Contrasts /θ s̪ s̠ ʃ ʂ/. Voiced allophones are found in fast speech.
Vietnamese	Saigon	xe	[s̺ɛ˧]	'vehicle'	Apical.
West Frisian		sâlt	[sɔːt]	'salt'	Laminal. It is laxer than in English and has a graver frication. It varies between retracted and non-retracted, depending on the environment. See West Frisian phonology

== Voiceless alveolar non-sibilant fricative ==
Voiceless alveolar non-sibilant fricative

θ̠

t̞

A voiceless alveolar non-sibilant fricative (also known as a slit fricative) is a consonantal sound in some spoken languages. As the International Phonetic Alphabet does not have separate symbols for non-sibilant alveolar fricatives, this sound can be transcribed by use of diacritics, such as ⟨θ̠⟩ (a retracted [θ]) or ⟨t̞⟩ (a lowered [t], appears in the IPA Handbook). Additional symbols include ⟨θ͇⟩ (with the alveolar diacritic, in extIPA) and ⟨ɹ̝̊⟩ (Note: More specifically described as a "voiceless alveolar rhotic fricative", which may be a slightly different sound than the other non-sibilant fricatives below.) (a raised and devoiced [ɹ], typically part of the affricate [tɹ̝̊]).

=== Features ===
- Its manner of articulation is fricative, which means it is produced by constricting air flow through a narrow channel at the place of articulation, causing turbulence. However, it does not have the grooved tongue and directed airflow, or the high frequencies, of a sibilant.
- Its place of articulation is alveolar, which means it is articulated with either the tip or the blade of the tongue at the alveolar ridge, termed respectively apical and laminal.
- Its phonation is voiceless, which means it is produced without vibrations of the vocal cords. In some languages the vocal cords are actively separated, so it is always voiceless; in others the cords are lax, so that it may take on the voicing of adjacent sounds.
- It is an oral consonant, which means that air is not allowed to escape through the nose.
- It is a median consonant, which means it is produced by directing the airstream down the midline of the tongue, rather than to the sides.
- Its airstream mechanism is pulmonic, which means it is articulated by pushing air only with the intercostal muscles and abdominal muscles, as in most speech sounds.

=== Occurrence ===
Language		Word	IPA	Meaning	Notes
Emilian	Bolognese	zidrån	[θ̠iˈdrʌn]	'lemon'	
English	Australian	mat	[ˈmæt̞]	'mat'	Rare allophone of /t/. See Australian English phonology
English	Irish	Italy	[ˈɪt̞ɪli]	'Italy'	Common allophone of /t/. See Hiberno-English § Phonology
English	New Zealand	batter	[ˈbɛt̞ə]	'batter'	One of many allophones of intervocalic /t/; may also be preaspirated. See New Zealand English phonology
English	Scouse	fit	[ˈfɪθ͇]	'fit'	Common allophone of /t/. See Scouse § Phonology
English	Received Pronunciation	potato	[pə̥ˈtʰɛɪ̯t̞ɜʉ̯]	'potato'	Common allophone of intervocalic /t/. See Received Pronunciation § Phonology
Icelandic		þú	[θ̠uː]	'you' (≡ thou)	Laminal. Variably removed from the front teeth, up to (nearly) spot on [θ]. May be affricated word initially. See Icelandic phonology

==== Voiceless alveolar tapped fricative ====
Voiceless alveolar tapped fricative

ɾ̞̊

Audio sample
- source · help

A few languages also have a voiceless alveolar tapped fricative, which is simply a very brief alveolar non-sibilant fricative, with the tongue making the gesture for a tapped stop but not making full contact. This can be indicated in the IPA with the lowering diacritic to show full occlusion did not occur, such as ⟨ɾ̞̊⟩. Tapped fricatives are occasionally reported in the literature, though these claims are not generally independently confirmed and so remain dubious.

Flapped fricatives are theoretically possible but are not attested.

Language		Word	IPA	Meaning	Notes
Afenmai		aru	[aɾ̞̊u]	'hat'	tense equivalent of lax /ɾ/.
English	General American	city	[ˈsɪɾ̞̊ɪ]	'city'	In free variation with a plain voiceless tap [ɾ̥]. Intervocalic allophone of /t/, more typically realized as a voiced tap [ɾ]. See General American English § T and D flapping
Portuguese	European	girar	[ʒiˈɾ̞̊aɾ]	'rotate'	Common allophone of /ɾ/ in all positions, and in some cases may also be an allophone of /ʁ/. See Portuguese phonology § Rhotics
Turkish		bir	[biɾ̞̊]	'a(n)'	Word-final allophone of /ɾ/. See Turkish phonology

==== Voiceless alveolar approximant ====
Voiceless alveolar approximant

ɹ̥

Audio sample
- source · help

Voiceless alveolar spirant approximant

s̞

A voiceless alveolar approximant is a similar sound with less turbulent airflow. The IPA has no dedicated symbol that represents this sound, but it may be transcribed as ⟨ɹ̥⟩ (a devoiced [ɹ]) or ⟨s̞⟩ (a lowered [s]). However, there may also be a featural distinction between these two transcriptions: [ɹ̥] has been described as a 'rhotic approximant', while [s̞] has been described as a 'spirant approximant'.

Language		Word	IPA	Meaning	Notes
Dutch	Speakers mainly with coronal /r/	Geert	[ɣeːɹ̥t]	'Geert'	One of many possible realizations of /r/; distribution unclear. See Dutch phonology
English		pray	[ˈpɹ̥eɪ]	'pray'	Realization of /r/ after voiceless plosives, with [j̊] and [w̥] seeing equivalent patterning for /j/ and /w/. See English phonology
Faroese		eiturkoppur	[ˈaiːtʊɹ̥ˌkʰɔʰpːʊɹ]	'spider'	Devoiced approximant allophone of /r/. See Faroese phonology
Miyakoan	Irabu	[ps̞tu]		'man'	Devoiced allophone of [z̞] when occurring after a voiceless bilabial plosive /p/. See Miyakoan language § Phonology
Spanish	Chilean	socito	[s̞oˈs̞it̪o]	'partner/buddy' (dim)	Allophone of /s/. In variation with numerous other allophones (depending on position) with varying degrees of stigmatization, with up to 15 allophones of /s/ in total: three approximants [θ̞, θ̞᫈, s̞], ten fricatives [θ, θ̟, s, s͎, s̠, z, ɕ, ʂ᫈, h, ɦ], one affricate [ts], and one null phone [∅].

== See also ==
- Voiceless corono-dentoalveolar sibilant
- Apical consonant
- Laminal consonant
- Index of phonetics articles

== Bibliography ==
- Adams, Douglas Q. (1975), "The Distribution of Retracted Sibilants in Medieval Europe", Language, 51 (2): 282–292, doi:10.2307/412855, JSTOR 412855
- Árnason, Kristján (2011), The Phonology of Icelandic and Faroese, Oxford University Press, ISBN 978-0-19-922931-4
- Arvaniti, Amalia (2007), "Greek Phonetics: The State of the Art" (PDF), Journal of Greek Linguistics, 8: 97–208, doi:10.1075/jgl.8.08arv, archived from the original (PDF) on 2013-12-11
- Axundov, Ağamusa (1983), Azərbaycan dilinin fonetikasi, Baku
- Basbøll, Hans (2005), The Phonology of Danish, Taylor & Francis, ISBN 978-0-203-97876-4
- Bauer, Laurie; Warren, Paul (2004), "New Zealand English: phonology", in Schneider, Edgar W.; Burridge, Kate; Kortmann, Bernd; Mesthrie, Rajend; Upton, Clive (eds.), A handbook of varieties of English, vol. 1: Phonology, Mouton de Gruyter, pp. 580–602, ISBN 978-3-11-017532-5
- Bertinetto, Marco; Loporcaro, Michele (2005), "The sound pattern of Standard Italian, as compared with the varieties spoken in Florence, Milan and Rome", Journal of the International Phonetic Association, 35 (2): 131–151, doi:10.1017/S0025100305002148, hdl:11384/4071
- Betancourt Arango, Amanda (1993), "Lengua y región" [Language and region] (PDF), Thesaurus (in Spanish), XLVIII (2), Bogota: 255–291
- Buk S, Mačutek J, Rovenchak A (2008), "Some properties of the Ukrainian writing system", Glottometrics, 16: 63–79, arXiv:0802.4198, Bibcode:2008arXiv0802.4198B
- Buizza, Emanuela (2011), "Frication and affrication of /t/ in RP English" ( (PDF)), Language at the University of Essex (LangUE) 2010 Proceedings, pp. 16–28, archived from the original on 2014-04-19
- Candia, Mauricio A. Figueroa; Rogers, Brandon M. A. (2026), "16: Spanish Approximants", in Ball, Martin J. (ed.), The Phonetics and Phonology of Approximants, Studies in Phonetics and Phonology, Toronto, Buffalo, London: University of Toronto Press, pp. 270–290, ISBN 9781487528867
- Canepari, Luciano (1992), Il MªPi – Manuale di pronuncia italiana [Handbook of Italian Pronunciation] (in Italian), Bologna: Zanichelli, ISBN 978-88-08-24624-0
- Carbonell, Joan F.; Llisterri, Joaquim (1992), "Catalan", Journal of the International Phonetic Association, 22 (1–2): 53–56, doi:10.1017/S0025100300004618, S2CID 249411809
- Chew, Peter A. (2003), A computational phonology of Russian, Universal Publishers
- Collins, Beverley; Mees, Inger M. (2003) [First published 1981], The Phonetics of English and Dutch (5th ed.), Leiden: Brill Publishers, ISBN 978-9004103405
- Cruz-Ferreira, Madalena (1995), "European Portuguese", Journal of the International Phonetic Association, 25 (2): 90–94, doi:10.1017/S0025100300005223, S2CID 249414876
- Dalbor, John B. (1980), "Observations on Present-Day Seseo and Ceceo in Southern Spain", Hispania, 63 (1), American Association of Teachers of Spanish and Portuguese: 5–19, doi:10.2307/340806, JSTOR 340806
- Durie, Mark (1984). A grammar of Acehnese (PhD thesis). Australian National University. doi:10.25911/5d6fa25bcc31c. hdl:1885/138059.
- Engstrand, Olle (1999), "Swedish", Handbook of the International Phonetic Association: A Guide to the usage of the International Phonetic Alphabet., Cambridge University Press, pp. 140–142, ISBN 978-0-521-65236-0
- Engstrand, Olle (2004), Fonetikens grunder (in Swedish), Lund: Studenlitteratur, ISBN 978-91-44-04238-1
- Espejo Olaya, María Bernarda (2015), Alofonía de /s/ en Colombia, Bogota: Caro and Cuervo Institute, archived from the original on 2017-03-23
- Fiasson, Romain (2016), "Frication, pre-aspiration and tapping of medial /t/ in New Zealand English" (PDF), Te Reo, 59: 47–69
- Fougeron, Cecile; Smith, Caroline L (1999), "French", Handbook of the International Phonetic Association: A guide to the use of the International Phonetic Alphabet, vol. 23, Cambridge: Cambridge University Press, pp. 73–76, doi:10.1017/S0025100300004874, ISBN 978-0-521-65236-0, S2CID 249404451
- Grønnum, Nina (2005), Fonetik og fonologi, Almen og Dansk (3rd ed.), Copenhagen: Akademisk Forlag, ISBN 978-87-500-3865-8
- Gussenhoven, Carlos (1999), "Dutch", Handbook of the International Phonetic Association: A guide to the use of the International Phonetic Alphabet, Cambridge: Cambridge University Press, pp. 74–77, ISBN 978-0-521-65236-0
- Haugen, Einar (1958), "The Phonemics of Modern Icelandic", Language, 34 (1): 55–88, doi:10.2307/411276, JSTOR 411276
- Hickey, Raymond (1984), "Coronal Segments in Irish English", Journal of Linguistics, 20 (2): 233–250, doi:10.1017/S0022226700013876, S2CID 145672742
- Honeybone, P (2001), "Lenition inhibition in Liverpool English", English Language and Linguistics, 5 (2): 213–249, doi:10.1017/S1360674301000223, S2CID 91182225
- Hualde, José Ignacio; Lujanbio, Oihana; Zubiri, Juan Joxe (2010), "Goizueta Basque" (PDF), Journal of the International Phonetic Association, 40 (1): 113–127, doi:10.1017/S0025100309990260
- Jesus, Luis M. T.; Shadle, Christine H. (2005), "Acoustic Analysis of European Portuguese Uvular [χ, ʁ] and Voiceless Tapped Alveolar [ɾ̥] Fricatives", Journal of the International Phonetic Association, 35 (1): 27–44, JSTOR 44526395
- Joaquín Montes Giraldo, José (1992), "Lingüística, idiomática y español de América" [Linguistics, idiomatic and Spanish of America], Revista de Filología Española [Journal of Spanish Philology] (in Spanish), LXXII (3–4), Bogota: 337–343
- Jones, Mark J.; McDougall, Kirsty (2009), "The Acoustic Character of Fricated /t/ in Australian English: A Comparison with /s/ and /∫/", Journal of the International Phonetic Association, 39 (3): 265–289, doi:10.1017/S0025100309990132, JSTOR 44526545
- Kara, Dávid Somfai (2002), Kazak, Lincom Europa, ISBN 9783895864704
- Kara, Dávid Somfai (2003), Kyrgyz, Lincom Europa, ISBN 978-3895868436
- Klagstad, Harold L. Jr. (1958), "The Phonemic System of Colloquial Standard Bulgarian", The Slavic and East European Journal, 2 (1): 42–54, doi:10.2307/304696, JSTOR 304696
- Kordić, Snježana (2006), Serbo-Croatian, Languages of the World/Materials; 148, Munich & Newcastle: Lincom Europa, ISBN 978-3-89586-161-1
- Kozintseva, Natalia (1995), Modern Eastern Armenian, Lincom Europa, ISBN 978-3895860355
- Kress, Bruno (1982), Isländische Grammatik, VEB Verlag Enzyklopädie Leipzig
- Krishnamurti, Bhadriraju (2003), The Dravidian Languages, Cambridge Language Surveys (1 ed.), Cambridge: Cambridge University Press, ISBN 978-0-521-77111-5
- Ladefoged, Peter (2005), Vowels and Consonants (2nd ed.), Blackwell
- Ladefoged, Peter; Maddieson, Ian (1996). The Sounds of the World's Languages. Oxford: Blackwell. ISBN 0-631-19815-6.
- Lamb, William (2003), Scottish Gaelic (2nd ed.), Lincom Europa, ISBN 978-3-89586-727-9
- Landau, Ernestina; Lončarić, Mijo; Horga, Damir; Škarić, Ivo (1999), "Croatian", Handbook of the International Phonetic Association: A guide to the use of the International Phonetic Alphabet, Cambridge: Cambridge University Press, pp. 66–69, ISBN 978-0-521-65236-0
- Laver, John (1994), Principles of Phonetics, Cambridge: Cambridge University Press, ISBN 978-0-521-45655-5
- Lee, Wai-Sum; Zee, Eric (2003), "Standard Chinese (Beijing)", Journal of the International Phonetic Association, 33 (1): 109–112, doi:10.1017/S0025100303001208
- Lin, Hua (2001), A Grammar of Mandarin Chinese, Lincom Europa, ISBN 978-3-89586-642-5
- Loakes, Deborah; McDougall, Kirsty (2007), Frication of Australian English /p t k/: Group Tendencies and Individual Differences (PDF)
- Lunt, Horace G. (1952), Grammar of the Macedonian Literary Language, Skopje
- Maddieson, Ian (1984), Patterns of sound, Cambridge University Press
- Mangold, Max (2005) [First published 1962], Das Aussprachewörterbuch (6th ed.), Mannheim: Dudenverlag, ISBN 978-3-411-04066-7
- Marotta, Giovanna; Barth, Marlen (2005), "Acoustic and sociolingustic aspects of lenition in Liverpool English" (PDF), Studi Linguistici e Filologici Online, 3 (2): 377–413, archived from the original (PDF) on 2021-02-25
- Harris, Martin; Vincent, Nigel, The Romance Languages
- Martínez-Celdrán, Eugenio; Fernández-Planas, Ana Ma.; Carrera-Sabaté, Josefina (2003), "Castilian Spanish", Journal of the International Phonetic Association, 33 (2): 255–259, doi:10.1017/S0025100303001373
- Muthalib, Kismullah Abdul (2017). Dialect features of Leupueng children: a study of dialect in post tsunami Aceh (PhD thesis). Syiah Kuala University.
- Nau, Nicole (1998), Latvian, Lincom Europa, ISBN 978-3-89586-228-1
- Qafisheh, Hamdi A. (1977), A short reference grammar of Gulf Arabic, Tucson, Arizona: University of Arizona Press, ISBN 978-0-8165-0570-8
- Obaid, Antonio H. (1973), "The Vagaries of the Spanish 'S'", Hispania, 56 (1): 60–67, doi:10.2307/339038, JSTOR 339038
- Okada, Hideo (1999), "Japanese", in International Phonetic Association (ed.), Handbook of the International Phonetic Association: A Guide to the Use of the International Phonetic Alphabet, Cambridge University Press, pp. 117–119, ISBN 978-0-52163751-0
- Padluzhny, Ped (1989), Fanetyka belaruskai litaraturnai movy, Навука і тэхніка, ISBN 978-5-343-00292-8
- Palková, Zdena (1994), Fonetika a fonologie češtiny, Karolinum, ISBN 978-8070668436
- Pandeli, H; Eska, J; Ball, Martin; Rahilly, J (1997), "Problems of phonetic transcription: the case of the Hiberno-English slit-t", Journal of the International Phonetic Association, 27 (1–2): 65–75, doi:10.1017/S0025100300005430, S2CID 145119728
- Pétursson, Magnus (1971), "Étude de la réalisation des consonnes islandaises þ, ð, s, dans la prononciation d'un sujet islandais à partir de la radiocinématographie", Phonetica, 33 (4): 203–216, doi:10.1159/000259344, S2CID 145316121
- Pretnar, Tone; Tokarz, Emil (1980), Slovenščina za Poljake: Kurs podstawowy języka słoweńskiego, Katowice: Uniwersytet Śląski
- Puppel, Stanisław; Nawrocka-Fisiak, Jadwiga; Krassowska, Halina (1977), A handbook of Polish pronunciation for English learners, Warszawa: Państwowe Wydawnictwo Naukowe, ISBN 9788301012885
- Recasens, Daniel; Pallarès, Maria Dolores (2001), "Coarticulation, Assimilation and Blending in Catalan Consonant Clusters", Journal of Phonetics, 29 (3): 273–301, doi:10.1006/jpho.2001.0139
- Rocławski, Bronisław (1976), Zarys fonologii, fonetyki, fonotaktyki i fonostatystyki współczesnego języka polskiego, Gdańsk: Wydawnictwo Uczelniane Uniwersytetu Gdańskiego
- Saborit, Josep (2009), Millorem la pronúncia (in Catalan), Acadèmia Valenciana de la Llengua
- Sadowsky, Scott; Salamanca, Gastón (2011), "El inventario fonético del español de Chile: principios orientadores, inventario provisorio de consonantes y sistema de representación (AFI-CL)" [The phonetic inventory of chilean spanish: guiding principles, provisional inventory of consonants and system of representation (IPA-CL)] (PDF), Onomázein, 24 (2), Pontificia Universidad Católica de Chile, Santiago, Chile: 61–84, ISSN 0717-1285
- Sadowsky, Scott (2015), "Variación sociofonética de las consonantes del castellano chileno" [Sociophonetic variation in Chilean Spanish consonants] (PDF), Sociolinguistic Studies, 9 (1), Universidad de La Frontera, Temuco, Chile: Equinox Publishing: 71–92, doi:10.1558/sols.v9i1.19927, eISSN 1750-8657, ISSN 1750-8649
- Shimoji, Michinori (2008), A Grammar of Irabu, a Southern Ryukyuan Language, Australian National University, doi:10.25911/5d5fc82596df5, hdl:1885/150638
- Shosted, Ryan K.; Chikovani, Vakhtang (2006), "Standard Georgian" (PDF), Journal of the International Phonetic Association, 36 (2): 255–264, doi:10.1017/S0025100306002659
- Sipma, Pieter (1913), Phonology & grammar of modern West Frisian, London: Oxford University Press
- Sjoberg, Andrée F. (1963), Uzbek Structural Grammar, Uralic and Altaic Series, vol. 18, Bloomington: Indiana University
- Skaug, Ingebjørg (2003) [First published 1996], Norsk språklydlære med øvelser (3rd ed.), Oslo: Cappelen Akademisk Forlag AS, ISBN 978-82-456-0178-7
- Šewc-Schuster, Hinc (1984), Gramatika hornjo-serbskeje rěče, Budyšin: Ludowe nakładnistwo Domowina
- Suomi, Kari; Toivanen, Juhani; Ylitalo, Riikka (2008), Finnish sound structure – Phonetics, phonology, phonotactics and prosody (PDF), Studia Humaniora Ouluensia 9, Oulu University Press, ISBN 978-951-42-8984-2
- Szende, Tamás (1999), "Hungarian", Handbook of the International Phonetic Association: A guide to the use of the International Phonetic Alphabet, Cambridge: Cambridge University Press, pp. 104–107, ISBN 978-0-521-65236-0
- Thelwall, Robin (1990), "Illustrations of the IPA: Arabic", Journal of the International Phonetic Association, 20 (2): 37–41, doi:10.1017/S0025100300004266, S2CID 243640727
- Thompson, Laurence C. (1959), "Saigon phonemics", Language, 35 (3): 454–476, doi:10.2307/411232, JSTOR 411232
- Thompson, Laurence C. (1987), A Vietnamese Reference Grammar, University of Hawaii Press, ISBN 978-0-8248-1117-4
- Thorborg, Lisbet (2003), Dansk udtale - øvebog, Forlaget Synope, ISBN 978-87-988509-4-6
- Torreblanca, Máximo (1988), "Latín Basium, Castellano Beso, Catalán Bes, Portugués Beijo", Hispanic Review, 56 (3): 343–348, doi:10.2307/474023, JSTOR 474023
- Vijūnas, Aurelijus (2010), "The Proto-Indo-European Sibilant */s/", Historische Sprachforschung, 123, Göttingen: 40–55, doi:10.13109/hisp.2010.123.1.40, ISSN 0935-3518
- Watson, Kevin (2007), "Liverpool English", Journal of the International Phonetic Association, 37 (3): 351–360, doi:10.1017/s0025100307003180
- Wheeler, Max W. (2005), The Phonology of Catalan, Oxford: Oxford University Press, ISBN 0-19-925814-7
- Yavuz, Handan; Balcı, Ayla (2011), Turkish Phonology and Morphology (PDF), Eskişehir: Anadolu Üniversitesi, ISBN 978-975-06-0964-0, archived from the original (PDF) on 2014-05-26
- Zimmer, Karl; Orgun, Orhan (1999), "Turkish" ( (PDF)), Handbook of the International Phonetic Association: A guide to the use of the International Phonetic Alphabet, Cambridge: Cambridge University Press, pp. 154–158, ISBN 978-0-521-65236-0, archived from the original on 2018-07-25

Place →	Labial					Coronal										Dorsal					Laryngeal			
Manner ↓	Bilabial		Labiodental		Linguolabial		Dental		Alveolar		Postalveolar		Retroflex		(Alveolo-)palatal		Velar		Uvular		Pharyngeal/epiglottal		Glottal	
Nasal	m̥	m	ɱ̊	ɱ		n̼	n̪̊	n̪	n̥	n	n̠̊	n̠	ɳ̊	ɳ	ɲ̊	ɲ	ŋ̊	ŋ	ɴ̥	ɴ				
Plosive	p	b	p̪	b̪	t̼	d̼	t̪	d̪	t	d			ʈ	ɖ	c	ɟ	k	ɡ	q	ɢ	ʡ		ʔ	
Sibilant affricate							t̪s̪	d̪z̪	ts	dz	t̠ʃ	d̠ʒ	tʂ	dʐ	tɕ	dʑ								
Non-sibilant affricate	pɸ	bβ	p̪f	b̪v			t̪θ	d̪ð	tɹ̝̊	dɹ̝	t̠ɹ̠̊˔	d̠ɹ̠˔			cç	ɟʝ	kx	ɡɣ	qχ	ɢʁ	ʡʜ	ʡʢ	ʔh	
Sibilant fricative							s̪	z̪	s	z	ʃ	ʒ	ʂ	ʐ	ɕ	ʑ								
Non-sibilant fricative	ɸ	β	f	v	θ̼	ð̼	θ	ð	θ̠	ð̠	ɹ̠̊˔	ɹ̠˔	ɻ̊˔	ɻ˔	ç	ʝ	x	ɣ	χ	ʁ	ħ	ʕ	h	ɦ
Approximant		β̞		ʋ				ð̞		ɹ		ɹ̠		ɻ		j		ɰ						˷
Tap/flap		ⱱ̟		ⱱ					ɾ̥	ɾ			ɽ̊	ɽ						ɢ̆		ʡ̆		
Trill	ʙ̥	ʙ							r̥	r		r̠	ɽ̊r̥	ɽr					ʀ̥	ʀ	ʜ	ʢ		
Lateral affricate									tɬ	dɮ			tꞎ	d𝼅	c𝼆	ɟʎ̝	k𝼄	ɡʟ̝						
Lateral fricative							ɬ̪		ɬ	ɮ			ꞎ	𝼅	𝼆	ʎ̝	𝼄	ʟ̝						
Lateral approximant								l̪	l̥	l		l̠	ɭ̊	ɭ	ʎ̥	ʎ	ʟ̥	ʟ		ʟ̠				
Lateral tap/flap									ɺ̥	ɺ			𝼈̊	𝼈		ʎ̆		ʟ̆						

		BL	LD	D	A	PA	RF	P	V	U
Implosive	Voiced	ɓ			ɗ		ᶑ	ʄ	ɠ	ʛ
Implosive	Voiceless	ɓ̥			ɗ̥		ᶑ̊	ʄ̊	ɠ̊	ʛ̥
Ejective	Stop	pʼ			tʼ		ʈʼ	cʼ	kʼ	qʼ
Ejective	Affricate		p̪fʼ	tθʼ	tsʼ	tʃʼ	tʂʼ	tɕʼ	kxʼ	qχʼ
Ejective	Fricative	ɸʼ	fʼ	θʼ	sʼ	ʃʼ	ʂʼ	ɕʼ	xʼ	χʼ
Ejective	Lateral affricate				tɬʼ			c𝼆ʼ	k𝼄ʼ	q𝼄ʼ
Ejective	Lateral fricative				ɬʼ					
Click (top: velar; bottom: uvular)	Tenuis	kʘ qʘ		kǀ qǀ	kǃ qǃ		k𝼊 q𝼊	kǂ qǂ		
Click (top: velar; bottom: uvular)	Voiced	ɡʘ ɢʘ		ɡǀ ɢǀ	ɡǃ ɢǃ		ɡ𝼊 ɢ𝼊	ɡǂ ɢǂ		
Click (top: velar; bottom: uvular)	Nasal	ŋʘ ɴʘ		ŋǀ ɴǀ	ŋǃ ɴǃ		ŋ𝼊 ɴ𝼊	ŋǂ ɴǂ	ʞ	
Click (top: velar; bottom: uvular)	Tenuis lateral				kǁ qǁ					
Click (top: velar; bottom: uvular)	Voiced lateral				ɡǁ ɢǁ					
Click (top: velar; bottom: uvular)	Nasal lateral				ŋǁ ɴǁ					
