= I before E except after C (disambiguation) =

"I before E except after C" is a mnemonic rule of thumb for English spelling.

I before E except after C may also refer to:

- "I Before E Except After C", track on Upstairs at Eric's, a 1982 album by Yazoo
- "I Before E Except After C", 1963 episode of East Side/West Side, a CBS TV series
