= Kalaba =

Kalaba may refer to:

== Places ==
- Kalaba, neighbirhood in Akyurt district, Ankara Province, Turkey
- Kalaba, Hani
- Kalaba, Sivrice
- Kalaba, Nevşehir, a town in Nevşehir Province, Turkey

== Surname ==
- Dušan Kalaba (born 1996), Serbian cyclist
- Harry Kalaba (born 1976), Zambian politician
- Rainford Kalaba, a Zambian footballer

== Other ==
- Kalaba-X, a constructed language
