= Minimal pair =

Two words that differ in only one element of their pronunciation

In phonology, minimal pairs are pairs of words or phrases in a particular language, spoken or signed, that differ in only one phonological element, such as a phoneme, toneme or chroneme, and have distinct meanings. They are used to demonstrate that two phones represent two separate phonemes in the language. Such a relationship is known as contrastive distribution.

Many phonologists in the middle part of the 20th century had a strong interest in developing techniques for discovering the phonemes of unknown languages, and in some cases, they set up writing systems for the languages. The major work of Kenneth Pike on the subject is Phonemics: a technique for reducing languages to writing. The minimal pair was an essential tool in the discovery process and was found by substitution or commutation tests.

As an example for English vowels, the pair "let" + "lit" can be used to demonstrate that the phones [ɛ] (in let) and [ɪ] (in lit) actually represent distinct phonemes /ɛ/ and /ɪ/. An example for English consonants is the minimal pair of "pat" + "bat". The following table shows other pairs demonstrating the existence of various distinct phonemes in English. All of the possible minimal pairs for any language may be set out in the same way.

| word 1 | word 2 | IPA 1 | IPA 2 | note |
|---|---|---|---|---|
| pin | bin | /pɪn/ | /bɪn/ | initial consonant |
| rot | lot | /rɒt/ | /lɒt/ | initial consonant |
| sap | zap | /sæp/ | /zæp/ | initial consonant |
| bin | bean | /bɪn/ | /biːn/ | vowel |
| pet | pat | /pɛt/ | /pæt/ | vowel |
| wood | wooed | /wʊd/ | /wuːd/ | vowel |
| hat | had | /hæt/ | /hæd/ | final consonant |
| sin | sing | /sɪn/ | /sɪŋ/ | final consonant |
| teeth | teethe | /tiːθ/ | /tiːð/ | final consonant |

Phonemic differentiation may vary between different dialects of a language so a particular minimal pair in one accent may be a pair of homophones in another. That means not that one of the phonemes is absent in the homonym accent but only that it is not contrastive in the same range of contexts; for example in accents with strong /æ/-raising, bag /bæg/ and beg /bɛg/ may merge (often into "bayg" /beɪg/), but the apple, kettle, and gate vowels remain generally unmerged.

== Types ==
In addition to the minimal pairs of vowels and consonants provided above, others may be found:

=== Quantity ===
Many languages show contrasts between long and short vowels and consonants. A distinctive difference in length is attributed by some phonologists to a unit called a chroneme. Thus, Italian has the following minimal pair that is based on long and short /l/:

| spelling | IPA | meaning |
|---|---|---|
| pala | /ˈpala/ | shovel |
| palla | /ˈpalla/ | ball |

However, in such a case it is not easy to decide whether a long vowel or consonant should be treated as having an added chroneme or simply as a geminate sound with phonemes.

Classical Latin, German, some Italian dialects, almost all Uralic languages, Thai, and many other languages also have distinctive length in vowels. An example is the cŭ/cū minimal pair in the Italian dialect that is spoken near Palmi (Calabria, Italy):

| Dialect spoken in Palmi | IPA | Quality | Etymology | Latin | Italian | English |
|---|---|---|---|---|---|---|
| Cŭ voli? | /kuˈvɔːli/ | short | cŭ < lat. qu(is) ("who?") | Quis vult? | Chi vuole? | Who wants? |
| Cū voli? | /kuːˈvɔːli/ | long | cū < lat. qu(o) (ill)ŭ(m) ("for-what him?") | Quō illum/illud vult? | Per che cosa lo vuole? | For what (reason) does he want him/it? |

==== Syntactic gemination ====
In some languages like Italian, word-initial consonants are geminated after certain vowel-final words in the same prosodic unit. Sometimes, the phenomenon can create some syntactic-gemination-minimal-pairs:

| Italian sandhi | IPA | Meaning | Sample sentence | Meaning of the sample sentence |
|---|---|---|---|---|
| dà casa | /dakˈkaza/ | (he/she) gives (his/her) house | Carlo ci dà casa. | Carlo gives us his house. |
| da casa | /daˈkaza/ | from home | Carlo uscì da casa. | Carlo got out from home. |

In the example, the graphical accent on dà is just a diacritical mark that does not change the pronunciation of the word itself. However, in some specific areas, like Tuscany, both phrases are pronounced /daˈkkaːza/ and so can be distinguished only from the context.

=== Tone ===
Minimal pairs for tone contrasts in tone languages can be established; some writers refer to that as a contrast involving a toneme. For example, Kono, of Sierra Leone, distinguishes high tone and low tone on syllables:

| tone | word | meaning |
|---|---|---|
| high | /kɔ́ɔ́/ | 'to mature' |
| low | /kɔ̀ɔ̀/ | 'rice' |

=== Stress ===
Languages in which stress may occur in different positions within the word often have contrasts that can be shown in minimal pairs, as in Greek and Spanish:

| word | language | IPA | meaning |
|---|---|---|---|
| ποτέ | Greek | /poˈte/ | ever |
| πότε | Greek | /ˈpote/ | when |
| esta | Spanish | /ˈesta/ | this (feminine) |
| está | Spanish | /esˈta/ | (he/she/it) is |
| supot | Tagalog | /ˈsupot/ | bag |
| supót | Tagalog | /suˈpot/ | uncircumcized |

In English stress can determine the part of speech of a word: insult as a noun is /ˈɪnsʌlt/ while as a verb it is /ɪnˈsʌlt/. In certain cases it can also differentiate two words: below /bɪˈloʊ/ vs billow /ˈbɪloʊ/.

=== Juncture ===
Anglophones can distinguish between, for example, "great ape" and "grey tape", but phonemically, the two phrases are identical: /ɡreɪteɪp/. The difference between the two phrases, which constitute a minimal pair, is said to be one of juncture. At the word boundary, a "plus juncture" /+/ has been posited and said to be the factor conditioning allophones to allow distinctivity: in this example, the phrase "great ape" has an /eɪ/ diphthong shortened by pre-fortis clipping and, since it is not syllable-initial, a /t/ with little aspiration (variously [t˭], [ɾ], [ʔt], [ʔ], etc., depending on dialect); meanwhile in "grey tape", the /eɪ/ has its full length and the /t/ is aspirated [tʰ].

Only languages with allophonic differences associated with grammatical boundaries may have juncture as a phonological element. There is disagreement over whether or not French has phonological juncture: it seems likely that the difference between, for example, "des petits trous" (some little holes) and "des petites roues" (some little wheels), phonemically both /depətitʁu/, is only perceptible in slow, careful speech.

== Minimal sets ==
The principle of a simple binary opposition between the two members of a minimal pair may be extended to cover a minimal set in which a number of words differ from one another in terms of one phone in a particular position in the word. For example, the vowels /a/, /e/, /i/, /o/, /u/ of Swahili are shown to be distinct by the following set of words: pata 'hinge', peta 'bend', pita 'pass', pota 'twist', puta 'thrash'. However, establishing such sets is not always straightforward and may require very complex study of multiple oppositions as expounded by, for example, Nikolai Trubetzkoy.

== Teaching ==
Minimal pairs were an important part of the theory of pronunciation teaching during its development in the period of structuralist linguistics, particularly in the 1940s and 1950s, and minimal pair drills were widely used to train students to discriminate among the phonemes of the target language. These drills took the form of minimal pair word drills and minimal pair sentence drills. For example, if the focus of a lesson was on the distinction /ɪ/ versus /ɛ/, learners might be asked to signal which sound they heard as the teacher pronounced lists of words with these phonemes such as lid/led, tin/ten, or slipped/slept. Minimal pair sentence drills consisted of paired sentences such as "He slipped on the floor/He slept on the floor." Again, learners would be asked to distinguish which of the sentences they heard as the teacher read them aloud. Another use of minimal pair drills was in pair work. Here, one member of the pair would be responsible for listening to the other member read the minimal pair word or sentence aloud and would be tasked with identifying which phoneme was being produced. In this form of classroom practice, both the skills of perception and production were practiced. Later writers have criticized the approach as being artificial and lacking in relevance to language learners' needs. However, even today minimal pair listening and production drills remain a common tool for the teaching of segmental differences.

Some writers have claimed that learners are likely not to hear differences between phones if the difference is not a phonemic one. One of the objectives of contrastive analysis of languages' sound systems was to identify points of likely difficulty for language learners that would arise from differences in phoneme inventories between the native language and the target language. However, experimental evidence for this claim is hard to find, and the claim should be treated with caution.

== In sign languages ==
In the past, signs were considered holistic forms without internal structure. However, the discovery in the mid-20th century that minimal pairs also exist in sign languages showed that sign languages have sublexical structure. Signs consist of phonemes, which are specifications for location, movement, handshape, orientation, and non-manual elements. When signs differ in only one of these specifications, they form a minimal pair. For instance, the German Sign Language signs shoes and socks are identical in form apart from their handshapes.

== See also ==
- Phoneme § Minimal pairs

== Bibliography ==
- Brown, G. (1990) Listening to Spoken English, Longman
- Celce-Murcia, M., D. Brinton and J. Goodwin (1996) Teaching Pronunciation, Cambridge University Press
- Fromkin, V. and Rodman, R. (1993) An Introduction to Language, Harcourt Brace Jovanovich
- Jones, Daniel (1931) 'ðə "wəːd" əz ə fonetik entiti' ['The "Word" as a phonetic entity'], Le Maître Phonétique, XXXVI, pp. 60–65. JSTOR 44704471
- Jones, Daniel (1944) 'Chronemes and Tonemes', Acta Linguistica, IV, Copenhagen, pp. 1–10.
- Ladefoged, Peter (2001) Vowels and Consonants, Blackwell
- Ladefoged, Peter (2006) A Course in Phonetics, Thomson
- Lado, R. (1957) Linguistics across Cultures, University of Michigan Press
- Lado, R. (1961) Language Testing, Longman
- O'Connor, J.D. (1973) Phonetics, Penguin
- O'Connor, J.D and Tooley, O. (1964) 'The perceptibility of certain word-boundaries', in Abercrombie et al. (eds) In Honour of Daniel Jones, Longman, pp. 171–6.
- Pennington, M. (1996) Phonology in English Language Teaching, Longman
- Pike, Kenneth (1947) Phonemics, University of Michigan Press
- Roach, Peter (2009) English Phonetics and Phonology, Cambridge University Press
- Swadesh, M. (1934) 'The Phonemic Principle', Language vol. 10, pp. 117–29
- Trubetzkoy, N., translated by C. Baltaxe(1969) Principles of Phonology, University of California Press
