= Allograph =

Distinct shapes of a written symbol

⟨g⟩ rendered with or without a looptail are allographs of each other

In graphemics and typography, the term allograph is used of a glyph that is a design variant of a letter or other grapheme, such as a letter, a number, an ideograph, a punctuation mark or other typographic symbol.

== Graphemics ==
In graphemics, an obvious example in the Latin alphabet (and many other writing systems) is the distinction between uppercase and lowercase letters. Allographs can vary greatly, without affecting the underlying identity of the grapheme. Even if the word "cat" is rendered as "cAt", it remains recognizable as the sequence of the three graphemes ⟨c⟩, ⟨a⟩, ⟨t⟩.

Letters and other graphemes can also have significant variations that may be missed by many readers. The letter g, for example, has two common forms in different typefaces, and a wide variety in people's handwriting. A positional example of allography is the long s |ſ|, a symbol which was once widely used as a non-final allograph for the lowercase letter s. The Arabic script has particularly strong positional allography; Arabic letters have two to four allographs based on their position in the word.

Allographs can cause difficulty for character recognition, both by humans and computers. Children learning to read do not immediately realize that allographs represent the same character; the skills develop over the initial years of reading instruction. Mismatches between the allographs used in reading and writing (e.g., reading manuscript/block letters but writing cursive) may inhibit students' ability to recognize and name letters. Computerized optical character recognition (OCR) systems also encounter difficulties with allograph recognition, similar to human difficulties. Many different character recognition algorithms have been developed to alleviate the allograph problem for different input methods, different languages, and different users.

A further complication of allographs is that a grapheme variant can acquire a separate meaning in a specialized writing system. Two symbols that are allographic in one setting may represent different meanings in another. For example, in the International Phonetic Alphabet used in linguistics, ⟨a⟩ and ⟨ɑ⟩ represent different sounds, even though they are allographs of a lower-case ⟨a⟩ in normal English usage.

Such variants have distinct code points in Unicode and thus are not allographs for some applications. Because they have separate code points, even allographs like upper- versus lower-case letters may be treated as different characters by some computer applications (e.g., case-dependent passwords).

== Typography ==
Official dimensions of the euro sign

Allographs of the sign in a selection of type faces

In typography, the term 'allograph' is used more specifically to describe the different representations of the same grapheme or character in different typefaces. The resulting glyphs may look quite different in shape and style from the reference character or each other, but nevertheless their meaning remains the same.

In Unicode, a given character is allocated a code point: all allographs of that character have the same code point and thus the essential meaning is retained irrespective of font choice at time of printing or display. Typically, for example, U+0067 g LATIN SMALL LETTER G is given a loop tail in serif typefaces but not in sans-serif faces (e.g., Times New Roman: g, Helvetica: g) but its code point is constant and its meaning persists irrespective of typeface. (Note: The code U+0261 ɡ LATIN SMALL LETTER SCRIPT G in the IPA Extensions block is specified for use with the International Phonetic Alphabet and so incidental to this discussion.)

=== Typography of Han characters ===
In the Han script, there exist several graphemes that have more than one written representation. Han typefaces often contain many variants of some graphemes. Different regional standards have adopted certain character variants. For instance:

Standard	Allograph	Dictionary definition
Mainland China	户	户
Japan	戸	戸
Taiwan	戶	戶

== Homoglyph ==
The concept of the allograph may be compared and contrasted with that of the homoglyph – glyphs of different meaning that are visually similar. For example, the letter O and the figure 0 have similar shape but have different meanings; the three letters A, Α and А look identical but are characters from three different scripts (Latin, Greek and Cyrillic). These can be exploited for IDN homograph attacks, where a malicious actor uses homoglyphs to create a URL that looks identical to the intended URL to the user but will direct to a different location than intended.

== See also ==
- Allophone – Phone used to pronounce a single phoneme
- Han unification – Effort to map CJK characters in Unicode
- Copto-Arabic literature § Allography – Literature written by Copts in Arabic. (The term "allography" is used in Copto-Arabic studies for the Coptic practice of direct transliteration of their texts from Coptic script to Arabic script.)
