= Monolingual fieldwork =

Monolingual fieldwork is the practice of conducting linguistic fieldwork solely through the target language under investigation, without the use of interpreters or a lingua franca. In this approach, the linguist attempts to acquire proficiency in the target language in order to communicate directly with native speakers. Margaret Thomas writes that in monolingual approach it is "the linguist bears the burden of connecting the target language to the language(s) of analysis and of dissemination of research findings"; in the bilingual approach it is the native speaker who needs to identify "equivalences across the target and contact languages, and communicating those equivalences to the linguist."

The monolingual approach was advocated by linguist-anthropologist Franz Boas, who studied Native American languages, in the early 20th century. Boas believed that gaining command of the language was essential for understanding the culture and worldview of the speech community. Nevertheless, Boas was not fluent in any language he studied and often used English as lingua franca. Edward Sapir, one of the best known students of Boas, used only bilingual approach, even when he worked with Ishi, the last known speaker of the Yana language. Leonard Bloomfield also used monolingual fieldwork, and even wrote some letters to his American colleague in Ojibwe.

The monolingual approach was not very widespread, but gained some popularity in the 1940s by "monolingual demonstrations". However, the use of interpreters and lingua francas became more common as linguistics grew more theoretical and removed from ethnography.

Another school of linguistics that used monolingual approach was the Summer Institute of Linguistics (SIL), a Christian missionary organization. Linguist Kenneth Lee Pike was the president and central figure of the organization. SIL linguists sometimes spend years learning the languages in distant communities, with the goal to learn a language on a level needed to translate the Bible; SIL linguists "embraced, even insisted on, the challenges of monolingual fieldwork".

Daniel Everett, who started his career at SIL, became the most notable proponent of monolingual fieldwork in the 1990s. He spent more than 20 years in Brazil, in the Amazonian jungles, studying Pirahã language.
