= Sememe =

Semantic language unit of meaning

A sememe (/ˈsɛmiːm/; from Ancient Greek σημαίνω (sēmaínō) 'mean, signify') is a semantic language unit of meaning, analogous to a morpheme. The concept is relevant in structural semiotics.

A seme is a proposed unit of transmitted or intended meaning; it is atomic or indivisible. A sememe can be the meaning expressed by a morpheme, such as the English pluralizing morpheme -s, which carries the sememic feature [+ plural]. Alternatively, a single sememe (for example [go] or [move]) can be conceived as the abstract representation of such verbs as skate, roll, jump, slide, turn, or boogie. It can be thought of as the semantic counterpart to any of the following: a meme in a culture, a gene in a genome, or an atom (or, more generally, an elementary particle) in a substance. A seme is the name for the smallest unit of meaning recognized in semantics, referring to a single characteristic of a sememe.

There are five types of sememes: two denotational and three connotational, the latter occurring only in phrase units (they do not reflect the denotation):

1. Denotational 1: Primary denotation, for example "head" (body);
2. Denotational 2: Secondary denotation by resemblance with other denotation: "head" (ship);
3. Connotational 1: Analogous in function or nature as the original denotation, for example, "head" used as managing or leading positions, which is similar to the role or function of "head" in the operation of the human body;
4. Connotational 2: Emotive, e.g. meaning in "honey";
5. Connotational 3: Evaluative, e.g. meaning in "sneak" – move silently and secretly for a bad purpose

The operational definition of synonymy depends on the distinctions between these classes of sememes. For example, the differentiation between what some academics call cognitive synonyms and near-synonyms depends on these differences.

A related concept is that of the episememe (as described in the works of Leonard Bloomfield), which is a unit of meaning corresponding to the tagmeme.

== See also ==
- Emic unit
- Memetics
- Problem of universals
- Semantic field
- Word sense
