= Linguistic Association of Canada and the United States =

Academic organization

The Linguistic Association of Canada and the United States (LACUS) was founded in August 1974 by a group of linguists of the Great Lakes region. This was largely a reaction against the narrowing of the field following Noam Chomsky’s generative grammar theory. The first annual meeting was held in 1974 at Lake Forest College; the second, in 1975 at the University of Toronto; and the third, in 1976 at the University of Texas at El Paso. Since then, the annual meetings have continued to be held at colleges and universities in both countries, from which volumes of proceedings are published under the title LACUS Forum. Former presidents of LACUS include Dwight Bolinger, Kenneth L. Pike, H.A. Gleason, Jr., Charles F. Hockett, Michael A.K. Halliday, Victor H. Yngve, and Robert Longacre.
