= Segment (linguistics) =

Distinct unit of speech

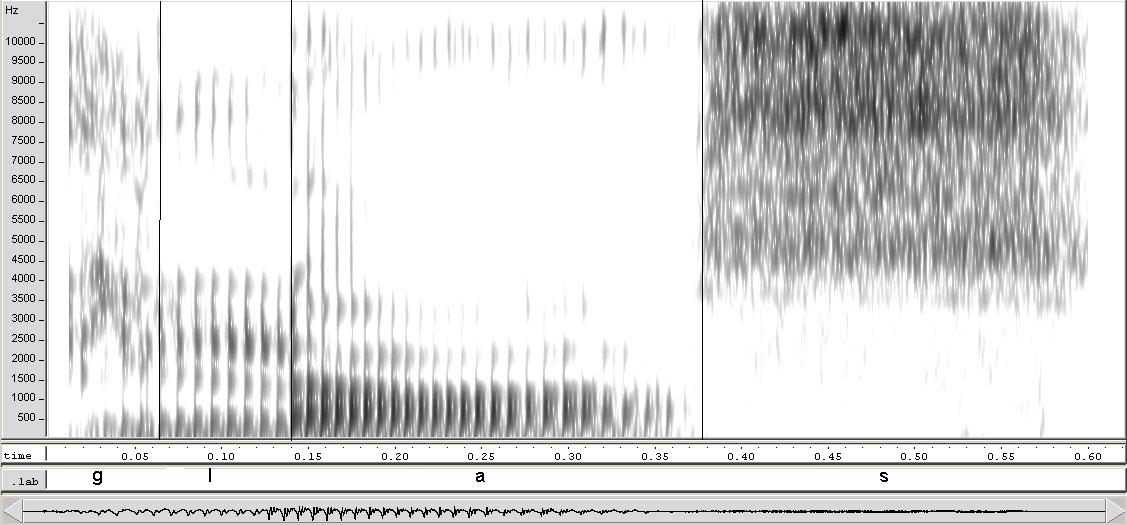
A spectrogram of the word glass [glaːs], with four distinct segments: [g], [l], [a] (lengthened), and [s].

In linguistics, a segment is "any discrete unit that can be identified, either physically or auditorily, in the stream of speech". The term is most used in phonetics and phonology to refer to the smallest elements in a language, and this usage can be synonymous with the term phone.

In spoken languages, segments will typically be grouped into consonants and vowels, but the term can be applied to any minimal unit of a linear sequence meaningful to the given field of analysis, such as a mora or a syllable in prosodic phonology, a morpheme in morphology, or a chereme in sign language analysis.

Segments are called "discrete" because they are, at least at some analytical level, separate and individual, and temporally ordered. Segments are generally not completely discrete in speech production or perception, however. The articulatory, visual and acoustic cues that encode them often overlap. Examples of overlap for spoken languages can be found in discussions of phonological assimilation, coarticulation, and other areas in the study of phonetics and phonology, especially autosegmental phonology.

Other articulatory, visual or acoustic cues, such as prosody (tone, stress), and secondary articulations such as nasalization, may overlap multiple segments and cannot be discretely ordered with them. These elements are known as suprasegmentals.

== Types ==
In phonetics, the smallest perceptible segment is a phone. In phonology, there is a subfield of segmental phonology that deals with the analysis of speech into phonemes (or segmental phonemes), which correspond fairly well to phonetic segments of the analysed speech.

The segmental phonemes of sign language (formally called "cheremes") are visual movements of hands, face, eye blinks, and body. They occur in a distinct spatial and temporal order. The SignWriting script represents the spatial order of the segments with a spatial cluster of graphemes. Other notations for sign language use a temporal order that implies a spatial order.

== Marginal segments ==
When analyzing the inventory of segmental units in any given language, some segments will be found to be marginal, in the sense that they are only found in onomatopoeic words, interjections, loan words, or a very limited number of ordinary words, but not throughout the language. Marginal segments, especially in loan words, are often the source of new segments in the general inventory of a language.

== Suprasegmentals ==
Some contrastive elements of speech cannot be easily analyzed as distinct segments but rather belong to a syllable or word. These elements are called suprasegmental, and include intonation and stress. In some languages nasality and vowel harmony are considered suprasegmental or prosodic by some phonologists.

== See also ==
- Emic unit
- Speech segmentation

Place →	Labial					Coronal										Dorsal					Laryngeal			
Manner ↓	Bilabial		Labiodental		Linguolabial		Dental		Alveolar		Postalveolar		Retroflex		(Alveolo-)palatal		Velar		Uvular		Pharyngeal/epiglottal		Glottal	
Nasal	m̥	m	ɱ̊	ɱ		n̼	n̪̊	n̪	n̥	n	n̠̊	n̠	ɳ̊	ɳ	ɲ̊	ɲ	ŋ̊	ŋ	ɴ̥	ɴ				
Plosive	p	b	p̪	b̪	t̼	d̼	t̪	d̪	t	d			ʈ	ɖ	c	ɟ	k	ɡ	q	ɢ	ʡ		ʔ	
Sibilant affricate							t̪s̪	d̪z̪	ts	dz	t̠ʃ	d̠ʒ	tʂ	dʐ	tɕ	dʑ								
Non-sibilant affricate	pɸ	bβ	p̪f	b̪v			t̪θ	d̪ð	tɹ̝̊	dɹ̝	t̠ɹ̠̊˔	d̠ɹ̠˔			cç	ɟʝ	kx	ɡɣ	qχ	ɢʁ	ʡʜ	ʡʢ	ʔh	
Sibilant fricative							s̪	z̪	s	z	ʃ	ʒ	ʂ	ʐ	ɕ	ʑ								
Non-sibilant fricative	ɸ	β	f	v	θ̼	ð̼	θ	ð	θ̠	ð̠	ɹ̠̊˔	ɹ̠˔	ɻ̊˔	ɻ˔	ç	ʝ	x	ɣ	χ	ʁ	ħ	ʕ	h	ɦ
Approximant		β̞		ʋ				ð̞		ɹ		ɹ̠		ɻ		j		ɰ						˷
Tap/flap		ⱱ̟		ⱱ					ɾ̥	ɾ			ɽ̊	ɽ						ɢ̆		ʡ̮		
Trill	ʙ̥	ʙ							r̥	r		r̠	ɽ̊r̥	ɽr					ʀ̥	ʀ	ʜ	ʢ		
Lateral affricate									tɬ	dɮ			tꞎ	d𝼅	c𝼆	ɟʎ̝	k𝼄	ɡʟ̝						
Lateral fricative							ɬ̪		ɬ	ɮ			ꞎ	𝼅	𝼆	ʎ̝	𝼄	ʟ̝						
Lateral approximant								l̪	l̥	l		l̠	ɭ̊	ɭ	ʎ̥	ʎ	ʟ̥	ʟ		ʟ̠				
Lateral tap/flap									ɺ̥	ɺ			𝼈̊	𝼈		ʎ̮		ʟ̆						

		BL	LD	D	A	PA	RF	P	V	U
Implosive	Voiced	ɓ			ɗ		ᶑ	ʄ	ɠ	ʛ
Implosive	Voiceless	ɓ̥			ɗ̥		ᶑ̊	ʄ̊	ɠ̊	ʛ̥
Ejective	Stop	pʼ			tʼ		ʈʼ	cʼ	kʼ	qʼ
Ejective	Affricate		p̪fʼ	t̪θʼ	tsʼ	t̠ʃʼ	tʂʼ	tɕʼ	kxʼ	qχʼ
Ejective	Fricative	ɸʼ	fʼ	θʼ	sʼ	ʃʼ	ʂʼ	ɕʼ	xʼ	χʼ
Ejective	Lateral affricate				tɬʼ			c𝼆ʼ	k𝼄ʼ	q𝼄ʼ
Ejective	Lateral fricative				ɬʼ					
Click (top: velar; bottom: uvular)	Tenuis	kʘ qʘ		kǀ qǀ	kǃ qǃ		k𝼊 q𝼊	kǂ qǂ		
Click (top: velar; bottom: uvular)	Voiced	ɡʘ ɢʘ		ɡǀ ɢǀ	ɡǃ ɢǃ		ɡ𝼊 ɢ𝼊	ɡǂ ɢǂ		
Click (top: velar; bottom: uvular)	Nasal	ŋʘ ɴʘ		ŋǀ ɴǀ	ŋǃ ɴǃ		ŋ𝼊 ɴ𝼊	ŋǂ ɴǂ	ʞ	
Click (top: velar; bottom: uvular)	Tenuis lateral				kǁ qǁ					
Click (top: velar; bottom: uvular)	Voiced lateral				ɡǁ ɢǁ					
Click (top: velar; bottom: uvular)	Nasal lateral				ŋǁ ɴǁ					
