= Kalaba-X =

Constructed language

Kalaba-X is a simple constructed language created by the American linguist Kenneth L. Pike to help with the teaching of translation techniques.

Each sentence in Kalaba-X has a fixed structure, consisting of three sentence parts: verb, object, subject, or more exactly, predicate (affirmation or assertion of a general status fact or occurring event), object (that indicates or restricts where the action applies or takes place, or allows qualifying it more precisely), subject (any triggering condition under which the fact can occur, and without which the predicate would not have occurred).

Under such definition, the grammatical structure of other languages can be more easily compared to each other, using Kalaba-X as a formal intermediate language for studying the language semantic (for example, this theoretical model does not define a grammatical difference between a noun and a verb, or between a verb and an adjective, as it is found in most European languages, because most nouns or adjectives of European languages can also be a predicate by themselves).

Each of these three parts, which are linked semantically rather than grammatically, can be modified. By focusing on the semantic rather than the grammatical structure of the source or target language, this constructed language can be used as an intermediate tool for producing better translations, notably between languages that have very different grammatical structures and where the semantic is organized differently into one or more subordinated sentences.

For example, the English sentence "This picture is very beautiful." would be structured in Kalaba-X as if it were written "Beautiful very, picture this, me." where the subject (me) is explicitly given in Kalaba-X rather than being subjectively implied by the context. Under such translation, the effective semantic of the sentence is "I (find that) this picture is very beautiful." where the author of the sentence is responsible for this affirmation. The English grammar may hide the fact that the "beautiful" adjective translates the concept of "enjoying", a true verb, so a simpler Kalaba-X sentence would be better "Enjoy a lot, picture this, me." But the analysis does not stop there, because Kalaba-X features no pronouns, i.e. no ambiguous substitutes; a more exact analysis would give "Enjoy a lot, picture here, speaker."

But other translations would be possible to indicate whether the opinion is personal or admitted more generally, by adding modifiers (considered adjectives in Kalaba-X) to the subject part (considered a noun) to condition the sentence, or to the object part (also considered a noun) to extend the scope of the predicate. Adding more modifiers in Kalaba-X to the initial verb part of such sentence can make the semantic more precise by including various modes (including tense, variability, recurrence, progress, negation...) but also logical composition relations like unions, intersections and exclusions).

== Sources and external links ==
- Kenneth L. Pike (1956). "Kalaba-X: An Artificial Language that Teaches the Art of Translation". Bibliotheca Sacra. Vol. 114.
