= Kenneth Lee Pike =

American linguist and anthropologist (1912–2000)

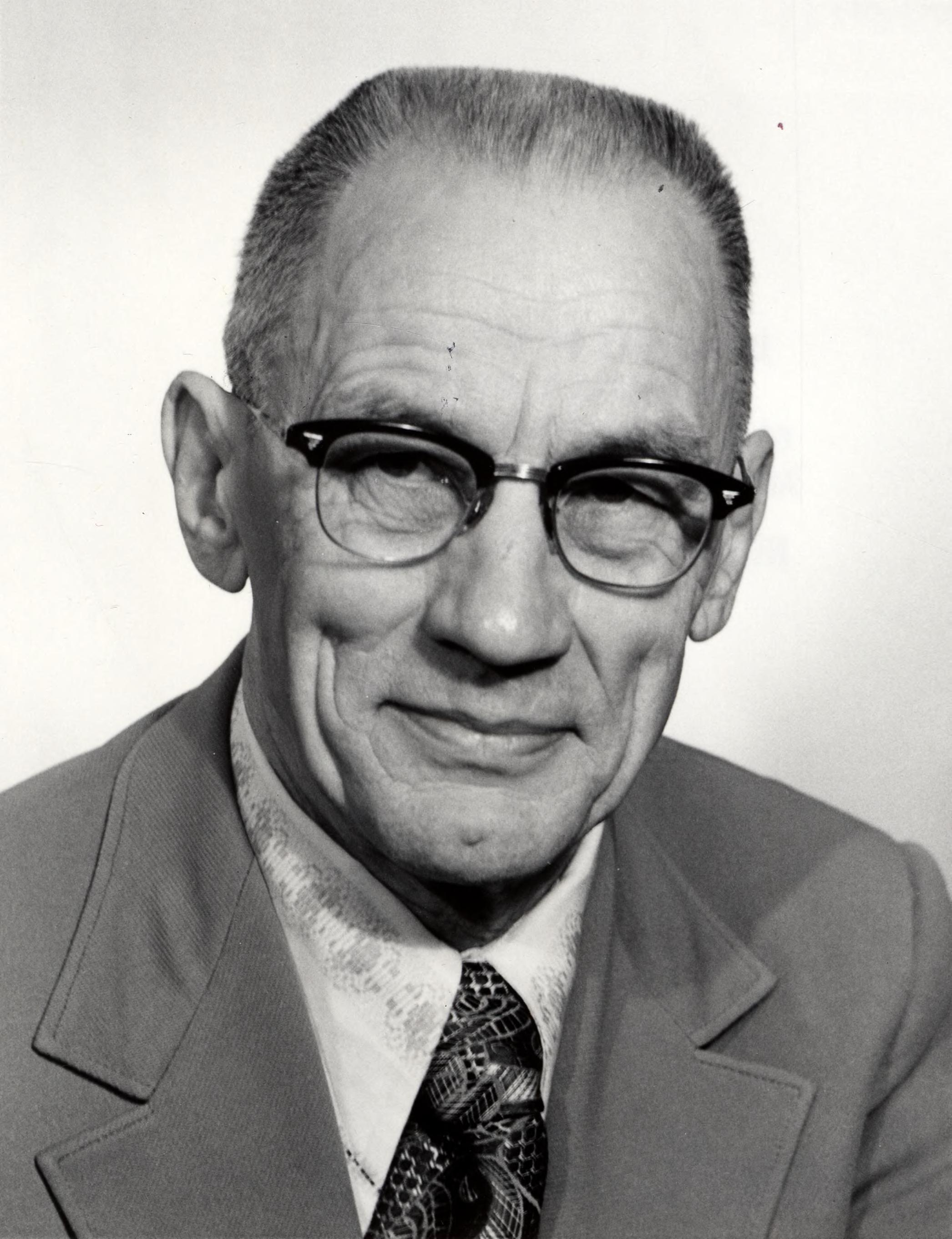
- Born: June 9, 1912; Woodstock, Connecticut
- Died: December 31, 2000 (aged 88); Dallas, Texas
- Known for: Tagmemics; Emic and etic

Academic background
- Education: Gordon College and University of Michigan
- Doctoral advisor: Charles C. Fries

Academic work
- Discipline: Linguist

Kenneth Lee Pike (June 9, 1912 – December 31, 2000) was an American linguist and anthropologist. He was the originator of the theory of tagmemics, the coiner of the terms "emic" and "etic" and the developer of the constructed language Kalaba-X for use in teaching the theory and practice of translation.

In addition, he was the First President of the Bible-translating organization Summer Institute of Linguistics (SIL), with which he was associated from 1935 until his death.

== Life ==
Pike was born in Woodstock, Connecticut, and studied theology at Gordon College, a private Christian college in Wenham, Massachusetts, graduating with a B.A. in 1933. He initially wanted to do missionary work in China. When this was denied him, he studied linguistics with the Summer Institute of Linguistics (SIL). He went to Mexico with SIL, learning Mixtec from native speakers there in 1935.

In 1937 Pike went to the University of Michigan, where he worked for his doctorate in linguistics under Charles C. Fries. His research involved living among the Mixtecs and developing a written system for the Mixtec language with his wife, Evelyn. After receiving his Ph.D. in 1942, Pike became the First President of the Summer Institute in Linguistics. Its main function was to produce translations of the Bible in unwritten languages, and in 1951 Pike published the Mixtec New Testament. He was the President of SIL International from 1942 to 1979.

As well as and in parallel with his role at SIL, Pike spent thirty years at the University of Michigan, during which time he served as chairman of its linguistics department, professor of linguistics, and director of its English Language Institute (he did pioneering work in the field of English language learning and teaching) and was later Professor Emeritus of the university.

== Work ==
Pike is best known for his 1954 distinction between the emic and the etic. "Emic" (as in "phonemics") refers to the role of cultural and linguistic categories as understood from within the cultural or linguistic system that they are a part of, while "etic" (as in "phonetics") refers to the analytical study of those sounds grounded outside of the system itself. Pike argued that only native speakers are competent judges of emic descriptions, and are thus crucial in providing data for linguistic research, while investigators from outside the linguistic group apply scientific methods in the analysis of language, producing etic descriptions which are verifiable and reproducible. Pike himself carried out studies of indigenous languages in Australia, Bolivia, Ecuador, Ghana, Java, Mexico, Nepal, New Guinea, Nigeria, the Philippines, and Peru.

Pike developed his theory of tagmemics to help with the analysis of languages from Central and South America, by identifying (using both semantic and syntactic elements) strings of linguistic elements capable of playing a number of different roles.

Pike's approach to the study of language put him outside the circle of the "generative" movement begun by Noam Chomsky, a dominant linguist in the 20th century, since Pike believed that the structure of language should be studied in context, not just as single sentences, as seen in the title of his magnum opus, Language in Relation to a Unified Theory of the Structure of Human Behavior (1967).

He became well known for his "monolingual demonstrations." He would stand before an audience, with a large number of chalkboards. A speaker of a language unknown to him would be brought in to work with Pike. Using gestures and objects, not asking questions in a language that the person might know, Pike would begin to analyze the language before the audience.

== Honors ==
Pike was a member of the National Academy of Sciences, the Linguistic Society of America (LSA), the Linguistic Association of Canada and the United States (LACUS), and the American Anthropological Association. He served as president of LSA and LACUS and later was nominated for the Templeton Prize three years in a row.

When he was named to the Charles Carpenter Fries Professorship of Linguistics at the University of Michigan in 1974, the Dean's citation noted that "his lifelong originality and energetic activity verge on the legendary." Pike was awarded honorary degrees by a number of institutions, including Huntington College, University of Chicago, Georgetown University, L'Université Réné Descartes (Sorbonne), and Albert-Ludwig Universität (University of Freiburg). Though the Nobel Prize committee did not publicize nominations, in 1983 US Senator Alan J. Dixon and US Congressman Paul Simon announced that they had nominated Pike for the Nobel Peace Prize. Academic sponsors for his nomination included Charles F. Hockett, Sydney Lamb (Rice University), Gordon J. van Wylen (Hope College), Frank H. T. Rhodes (Cornell University), André Martinet (Sorbonne), David C.C. Li (National Taiwan Normal University), and Ming Liu (Chinese University of Hong Kong).

== Bibliography ==
- See Complete list of Pike's publications (over 250)
- 1943: Phonetics, a Critical Analysis of Phonetic Theory and a Technique for the Practical Description of Sounds (Ann Arbor: University of Michigan Press)
- 1967: Language in Relation to a Unified Theory of the Structure of Human Behavior. The Hague: Mouton. 1954 – via Internet Archive.
- 1970: Rhetoric: Discovery and Change, with Richard E. Young and Alton L. Becker (New York: Harcourt, Brace, & World)

== See also ==
- Americanist phonetic notation § Pike
- Wycliffe Global Alliance
