= Kari Suomi =

Finnish linguist

- Born: 29 March 1948 (age 78); Turku
- Education: University of Turku
- Known for: English, Swedish and Finnish phonology
- Scientific career
- Fields: Phonetics
- Workplaces: University of Oulu
- Thesis: Voicing in English and Finnish Stops: A Typological Comparison with an Interlanguage Study of the Two Languages in Contact (1980)

Kari Juhani Suomi (born 29 March 1948 in Turku) is a Finnish linguist who was an assistant professor from 1985 to 2012 in the Department of Phonetics at the University of Oulu. He has researched English, Swedish and Finnish phonology.

His textbook Introduction to Speech Acoustics has been used for university teaching in Finnish phonetics, speech therapy and vocology since 1990.

His other two textbooks with Toivanen and Ylitalo are Fundamentals of Phonetics and Finnish Sound Theory, 2006, and Finnish Sound Structure: Phonetics, phonology, phonotactics and prosody, 2008.

== Works ==
=== Academic theses ===
- Suomi, Kari (1973). Tutkimus liittymän (Anschluss) havaitsemiseen vaikuttavista akustisista parametreistä (Master's thesis). University of Turku.
- Suomi, Kari (1980). Voicing in English and Finnish Stops: A Typological Comparison with an Interlanguage Study of the Two Languages in Contact (Doctoral thesis). University of Turku. ISBN 951-641-798-1.

=== International publications ===
- Suomi, Kari; Mcqueen, James M.; Cutler, Anne (1997). "Vowel Harmony and Speech Segmentation in Finnish" (PDF). Journal of Memory and Language. 36: 422–444.
- Suomi, Kari; Toivanen, Juhani; Ylitalo, Riikka (2003). "Durational and tonal correlates of accent in Finnish". Journal of Phonetics. 31 (1): 113–138. doi:10.1016/S0095-4470(02)00074-8.

=== Papers from Finnish phoneticians ===
- Suomi, Kari, ed. (1977). Papers from the 7th meeting of Finnish phoneticians Fonetiikan päivät. University of Turku. OCLC 248529475.
- Suomi, Kari, ed. (1991). Papers from the 16th meeting of Finnish phoneticians. University of Oulu. ISBN 978-951-42-3138-4. OCLC 52598659.
- Seppänen, Tapio; Suomi, Kari; Toivanen, Juhani, eds. (2004). The Phonetics Symposium 2004. University of Oulu. ISBN 978-951-42-7681-1. OCLC 076861730.

=== Textbooks ===
- Suomi, Kari (1988). Johdatusta fonologiaan [Introduction to phonology]. University of Oulu. ISBN 978-951-42-2557-4. OCLC 046136269.
- Suomi, Kari (1990). Johdatusta puheen akustiikkaan [Introduction to Speech Acoustics]. University of Oulu. ISBN 951-42-2922-3.
- Suomi, Kari (1996). Fonologian perusteita [Fundamentals of phonology]. University of Oulu. ISBN 978-951-42-4459-9. OCLC 236010605.
- Suomi, Kari; Toivanen, Juhani; Ylitalo, Riikka (2006). Fonetiikan ja suomen äänneopin perusteet [Fundamentals of phonetics and Finnish sound theory]. Helsinki: Gaudeamus. ISBN 978-952-49-5568-3.
- Suomi, Kari; Toivanen, Juhani; Ylitalo, Riikka (2008). Finnish sound structure: Phonetics, phonology, phonotactics and prosody (PDF). Studia Humaniora Ouluensia 9. Oulu University Press. ISBN 978-951-42-8984-2.
