= Emic and etic =

Two kinds of anthropologic field research

Emic (/ˈiːmɪk/) and etic (/ˈɛtɪk/) refer to two kinds of field research carried out in anthropology, folkloristics, linguistics, and the social and behavioral sciences, and viewpoints obtained from them.

The emic approach adopts an insider's perspective, which looks at the beliefs, values, and practices of a particular culture from the perspective of the people who live within it. This approach aims to understand the cultural meaning and significance of a particular behavior or practice, as it is understood by the people who engage in it.

The etic approach adopts an outsider's perspective, which looks at a culture from the perspective of an outside observer or researcher. This approach tends to focus on the observable behaviors and practices of a culture, and aims to understand them in terms of their functional or evolutionary significance. The etic approach often involves the use of standardized measures and frameworks to compare different cultures and may involve the use of concepts and theories from other disciplines, such as psychology or sociology.

The emic and etic approaches each have their own strengths and limitations, and each can be useful in understanding different aspects of culture and behavior. Some anthropologists argue that a combination of both approaches is necessary for a complete understanding of a culture, while others argue that one approach may be more appropriate depending on the specific research question being addressed.

== Definitions ==
"The emic approach investigates how local people think", how they perceive and categorize the world, their rules for behavior, what has meaning for them, and how they imagine and explain things. "The etic (scientist-oriented) approach shifts the focus from local observations, categories, explanations, and interpretations to those of the anthropologist. The etic approach realizes that members of a culture often are too involved in what they are doing ... to interpret their cultures impartially. When using the etic approach, the ethnographer emphasizes what he or she considers important."

Although emics and etics are sometimes regarded as inherently in conflict and one can be preferred to the exclusion of the other, the complementarity of emic and etic approaches to anthropological research has been widely recognized, especially in the areas of interest concerning the characteristics of human nature as well as the form and function of human social systems.

Emic knowledge and interpretations are those existing within a culture, that are 'determined by local custom, meaning, and belief' (Ager and Loughry, 2004: n.p.) and best described by a 'native' of the culture. Etic knowledge refers to generalizations about human behavior that are considered universally true, and commonly links cultural practices to factors of interest to the researcher, such as economic or ecological conditions, that cultural insiders may not consider very relevant (Morris et al., 1999).

Emic and etic approaches to understanding behavior and personality fall under the study of cultural anthropology, which states that people are shaped by their cultures and their subcultures, and we must account for this in the study of personality. One way is looking at things through an emic approach. This approach "is culture specific because it focuses on a single culture and it is understood on its own terms." As explained below, the term "emic" originated from the specific linguistic term "phonemic", from phoneme, which is a language-specific way of abstracting speech sounds.

- An etic account is a description of a behavior or belief by a social analyst or scientific observer (a student or scholar of anthropology or sociology, for example), in terms that can be applied across cultures; that is, an etic account attempts to be 'culturally neutral', limiting any ethnocentric, political or cultural bias or alienation by the observer.

When these two approaches are combined, the "richest" view of a culture or society can be understood. On its own, an emic approach would struggle with applying overarching values to a single culture. The etic approach is helpful in enabling researchers to see more than one aspect of one culture, and in applying observations to cultures around the world.

According to Ron Grimes (Ronald L. Grimes), one can become an observer, then a participant, and then a believer ("stepping in"). Writing academically requires "stepping out", i.e. forget that one is a believer.

== History ==
The terms were coined in 1954 by linguist Kenneth Pike, who argued that the tools developed for describing linguistic behaviors could be adapted to the description of any human social behavior. As Pike noted, social scientists have long debated whether their knowledge is objective or subjective. Pike's innovation was to turn away from an epistemological debate and turn instead to a methodological solution. Emic and etic are derived from the linguistic terms phonemic and phonetic, respectively, where a phone is a distinct speech sound or gesture (such distinction being referred to as phonetic), regardless of whether the exact sound is critical to the meanings of words, whereas a phoneme is a speech sound in a given language that, if swapped with another phoneme, could change one word to another. The possibility of a truly objective description was discounted by Pike himself in his original work; he proposed the emic–etic dichotomy in anthropology as a way around philosophical issues about the very nature of objectivity.

The terms were also championed by anthropologists Ward Goodenough and Marvin Harris with slightly different connotations from those used by Pike. Goodenough was primarily interested in understanding the culturally specific meanings of specific beliefs and practices; Harris was primarily interested in explaining human behavior.

Pike, Harris, and others have argued that cultural "insiders" and "outsiders" are equally capable of producing emic and etic accounts of their culture. Some researchers use "etic" to refer to outsider accounts, and "emic" to refer to insider accounts.

Margaret Mead was an anthropologist who studied the patterns of adolescence in Samoa. She discovered that the difficulties and the transitions that adolescents faced are culturally influenced. The hormones that are released during puberty can be defined using an etic framework, because adolescents globally have the same hormones being secreted. However, Mead concluded that how adolescents respond to these hormones is greatly influenced by their cultural norms. Through her studies, Mead found that simple classifications about behaviors and personality could not be used because peoples’ cultures influenced their behaviors in such a radical way. Her studies helped create an emic approach to understanding behaviors and personality. Her research deduced that culture has a significant impact in shaping an individual's personality.

Carl Jung, a Swiss psychoanalyst, is a researcher who took an emic approach in his studies. Jung studied mythology, religion, ancient rituals, and dreams, leading him to believe that there are archetypes that can be identified and used to categorize people's behaviors. Archetypes are universal structures of the collective unconscious that refer to the inherent way people are predisposed to perceive and process information. The main archetypes that Jung studied were the persona (how people choose to present themselves to the world), the anima and animus (part of people experiencing the world in viewing the opposite sex, that guides how they select their romantic partner), and the shadow (dark side of personalities because people have a concept of evil; well-adjusted people must integrate both good and bad parts of themselves). Jung looked at the role of the mother and deduced that all people have mothers and see their mothers in a similar way; they offer nurture and comfort. His studies also suggest that "infants have evolved to suck milk from the breast, it is also the case that all children have inborn tendencies to react in certain ways." This way of looking at the mother is an etic way of applying a concept cross-culturally and universally.

== See also ==
- Exonym and endonym – Categories in etymology
- Other explorations of the differences between reality and humans' models of it:
  - Blind men and an elephant – Parable illustrating ontological reasoning
  - Emic and etic units – Abstract object analyzed in linguistics
  - Internalism and externalism – Philosophical terms
  - Map–territory relation – Relationship between an object and a representation of that object
  - Nacirema – Satirical anthropological look at American society
