= Phone (phonetics) =

Distinct speech sound or gesture

In phonetics (a branch of linguistics), a phone is any distinct speech sound. It is any surface-level or unanalyzed sound of a language, the smallest identifiable unit occurring inside a stream of speech. In spoken human language, a phone is thus any vowel or consonant sound. In sign languages, a phone is the equivalent of a unit of gesture.

== Phones versus phonemes ==
Phones are the segments of speech that possess distinct physical or perceptual properties, regardless of whether the exact sound is critical to the meanings of words. Whereas a phone is a concrete sound used across various spoken languages, a phoneme is more abstract and narrowly defined: any class of phones that the users of a particular language nevertheless perceive as a single basic sound, a single unit, and that distinguishes words from other words. If a phoneme is swapped with another phoneme inside a word, it can change the meaning of that word. Said another way, switching one phoneme to another phoneme inside a word will change that word into another word (or into nonsense).

For instance, the [k] phone in the English word hick, a word transcribed as [hɪk] in the International Phonetic Alphabet (IPA), distinguishes it from other words, like hit, hip, hiss, hitch, etc., suggesting that [k] belongs to a phoneme in English. The English words kid and kit, [kɪd] and [kɪt] in the IPA, end with two distinct sounds (phones), [d] and [t], and swapping one for the other makes the one word sound like the other. Thus, in the English language, these particular phones are classifiable under two separate phonemes, transcribed as /d/ versus /t/ (slashes indicate phonemes in the IPA, while square brackets indicate phones). However, the difference between the [ɕ] sound in some dialects' pronunciation of sheet and the [ʃ] in shack ([ɕit] versus [ʃæk] in the IPA) never affects the meaning or identity of a word in English. Even if those particular phones are interchanged, those two words would still likely be recognized as sheet and shack by native English speakers. Therefore, the phones [ɕ] and [ʃ] do not belong to two separate phonemes in English; rather, they could be classified as two possible phonetic variations (called allophones) of the same phoneme. In contrast, languages other than English, such as some Slavic languages like Polish or Russian, may indeed perceive [ɕ] and [ʃ] as separate phonemes.

As another example, swapping the sounds [pʰ] and [p] in the English word spin does not change its meaning. However, in Hindustani (Hindi and Urdu), swapping these phones can change one word into another: for instance, [pʰal] (फल/پھل) means 'fruit', and [pal] (पल/پل) means 'moment'. The sounds [pʰ] and [p] are thus different phonemes in Hindustani but are not usually considered distinct phonemes in English.

== Connection to orthography ==
Whether a direct mapping between phonemes and characters is achieved depends on the type of orthography used. Phonological orthographies like the Indonesian orthography tend to have one-to-one mappings of phonemes to characters, whereas alphabetic orthographies like the English orthography tend to try to have direct mappings, but often end up mapping one phoneme to multiple characters.

In the examples above the characters enclosed in square brackets: "pʰ" and "p" are IPA representations of phones. The IPA unlike English and Indonesian is not a practical orthography and is used by linguists to obtain phonetic transcriptions of words in spoken languages and is therefore a strongly phonetically spelled system by design.

== See also ==
- Emic unit
- Index of phonetics articles

== Bibliography ==
- Barry, W. J. (2006). "Phoneme". In Brown, Keith (ed.). Encyclopedia of Language & Linguistics (2nd ed.). Elsevier. pp. 345–350. doi:10.1016/B0-08-044854-2/00009-2. ISBN 978-0-08-044854-1.
- Crystal, David (1971). Linguistics. Baltimore: Penguin.
- Loos, Eugene E., ed. (1997). "What is a phone?". LinguaLinks: Glossary of linguistic terms. SIL International. Archived from the original on 15 October 2017.
- "Urdu: Structure of Language". Language Information Service (LIS) – India. Mysore: Central Institute of Indian Languages. 2008.
