= San José Chinantequilla =

- Municipality and town
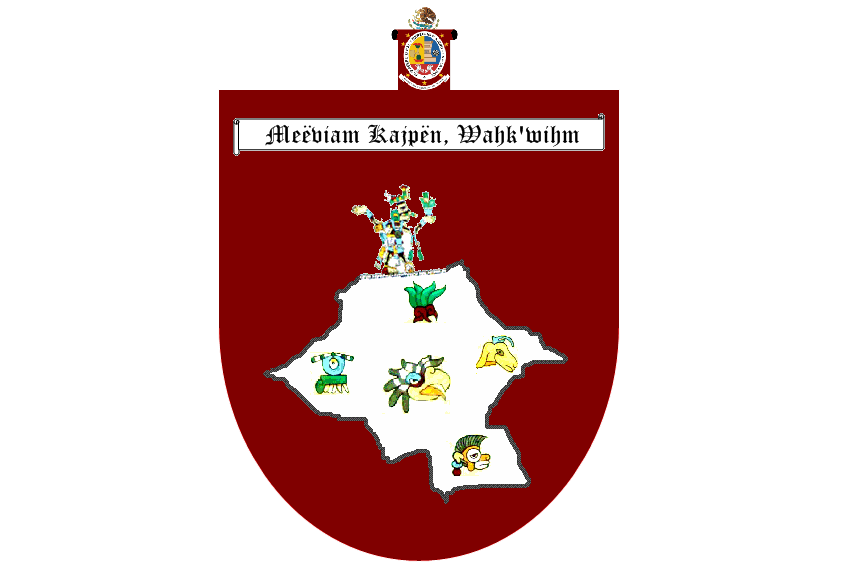
- Flag

- Location in Mexico
- Coordinates: 17°18′28″N 95°59′25″W
- Country: Mexico
- State: Oaxaca

Population (2010)
  - Total: 507
- Time zone: UTC-6 (Central Standard Time)
  - Summer (DST): UTC-5 (Central Daylight Time)
- Postal code: 70250

San José Chinantequilla is a Mexican village in the state of Oaxaca, in the municipality of Totontepec Villa de Morelos in the Sierra Mixe region. The village is located about 162 kilometers from Oaxaca City.

== Etymology ==
The name comes from the name chinantec Chinan meaning "shore", Qiya meaning grass (common in this region), the suffix "te" is equivalent to tepec which means "place" in an abbreviated form. Phonetically, it would read the glyph as Chinan-te-quiya, i.e. "on the edge of grass." In Cojum, an adaptation of the Mixe language it is called Käjpen Mëeviam which means "At the edge of the hill of grass."

== History ==
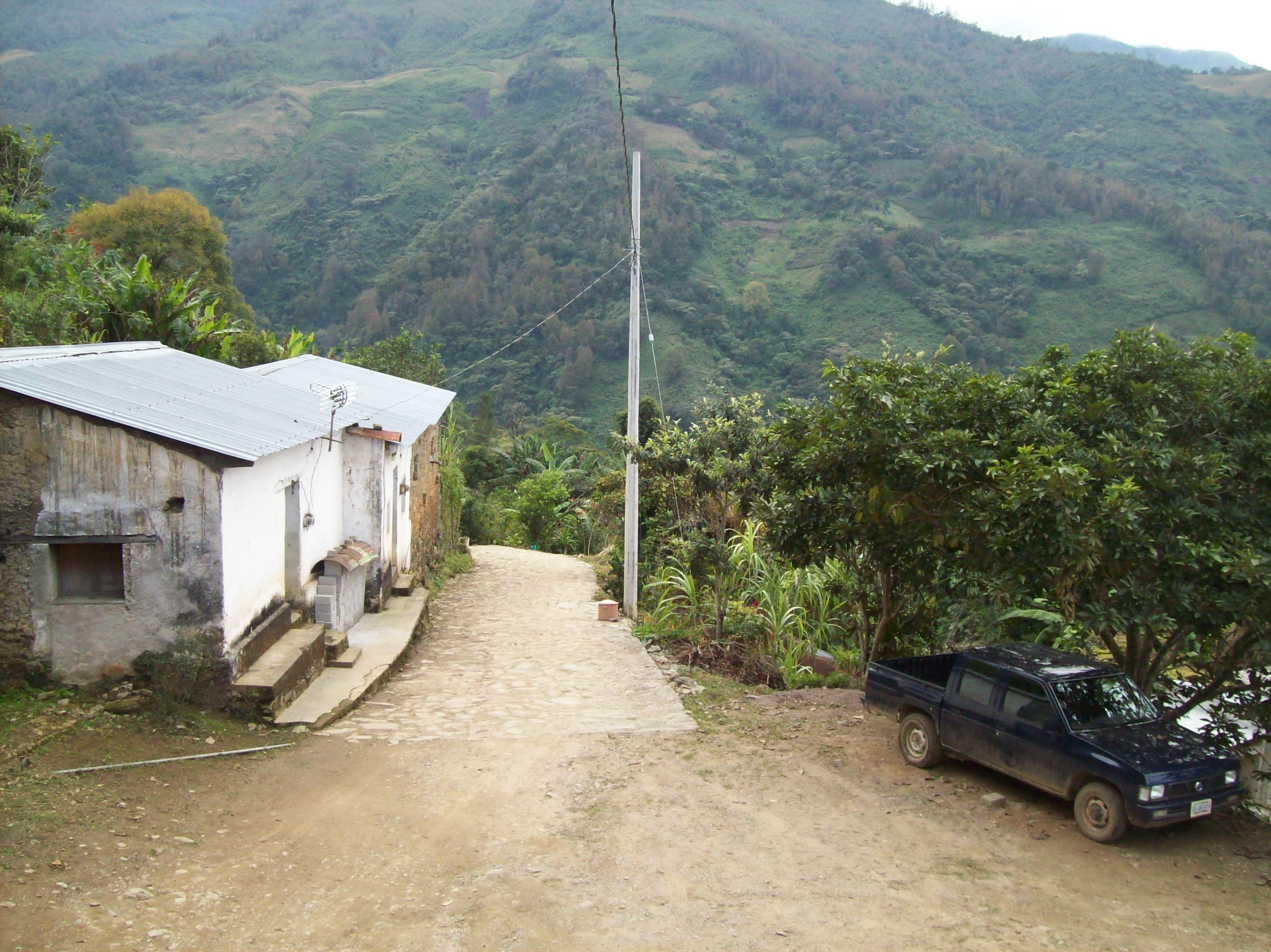
Street downtown San Jose Chinantequilla.

The origin of this village, like many other Mixe communities, is unknown due to a lack of historical data. Researchers assume that was one of the last villages to be founded in the Sierra Mixe.

There is a theory of the origin of this village which recounts the arrival of migrants from the state of Guanajuato who settled in this place in 1913. This area belonged to the community of Santiago Amatepec, and there were several years of territorial conflict over Chinantequilla between Amatepec and the neighboring Chinantec village of San Juan Comaltepec. This conflict was brought to an end with the arrival of law graduate Ignacio Franco, who offered to grant the territory of present Chinantequilla to Amatepec. Following a lawsuit that lasted about a year and was decided in favor of Amatepec, on May 13, 1913 a certificate was finally granted to Ignacio Franco which ceded the territory of what is now Chinantequilla. On June 25, 1920, the XXXIV Legislature of the State of Oaxaca issued Decree No. 194 which "grants category Municipal Agency, part of the municipality of Totontepec Villa de Morelos, the village called Chinantequilla."

== Geography ==
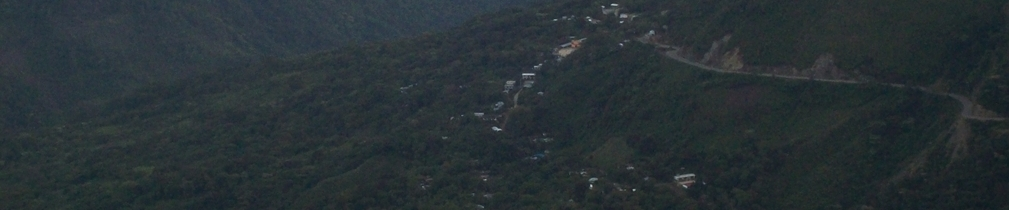
Panoramic of San José Chinantequilla.

San Jose Chinantequilla is located in the northeast of the state of Oaxaca within the Sierra Mixe, part of the Sierra Norte Region. It belongs to the municipality of Totontepec Villa de Morelos and has an area of approximately 6.9 square kilometers, which represents 0.9% of the total territory of the Mixe District. It lies between latitudes 17 ° 15 '- 17 ° 12' north latitude and 96 ° 02 '- 96 ° 09' west longitude, the altitude of its territory lies 1 000 to 1300 meters above sea level. Chinantequilla is located in the Sierra Madre de Oaxaca, an extension of the Sierra Madre Oriental so it is located on a hillside. Means of transport and communication have been improved in this area, which was previously very difficult to access.

=== Topography and hydrography ===
Nestled in one of the highest in the Sierra Mixe, the territory of San Jose is extremely rugged Chinantequilla, crossed by large mountains that make difficult regional transport difficult. The most important hill in the area is called Cerro de Algodón ("cotton hill"), at a height of about 1,396 meters above sea level, important for its historical and cultural value. There are several springs of water in the rainy season that are not used, the rivers of this area arrive at the basin the Rio Papaloapan and the sub-basin K 2832.

== Climate ==
San Jose Chinantequilla lies upon fertile soil, with the climate ranging from semi-warm to temperate sub-humid and rains in summer totalling between 2,500 and 3,000 millimeters. In this community, located in the Northern Highlands, the average temperature ranges from 17 °C to 32 °C.

== Natural Resources ==
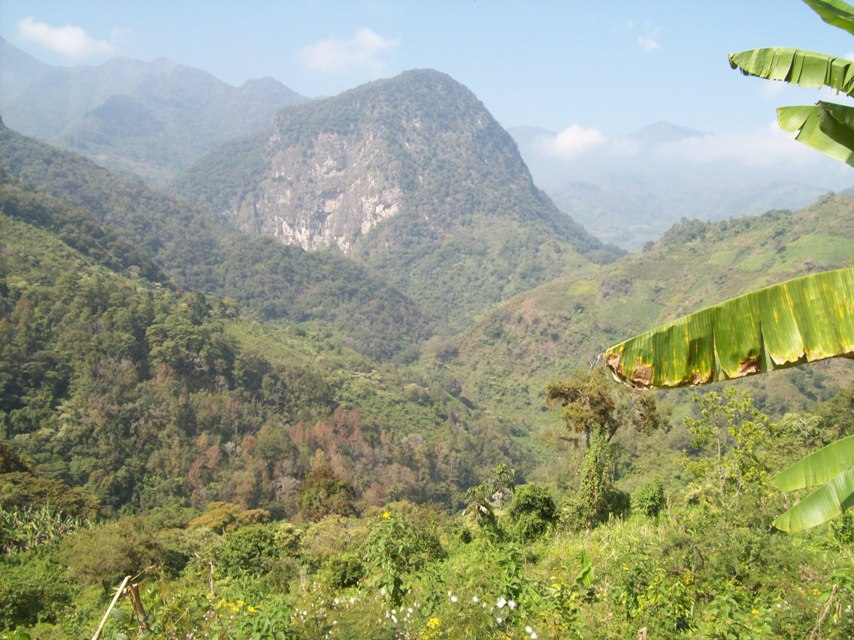
Cotton Hill.

=== Flora ===
The vegetation presents Chinantequilla territory is varied due to the range of altitudes above sea level available, it allows for a wide variety of vegetation, for example in the highest part of the vegetation is cloud forest characteristic of mountain s covered mist, there is also the presence of secondary forest tree, in the presence of pines and oaks, at the bottom there bat eagle, strawberry, sweetgum, among others.

As for vegetation grown there is the presence of flower is like lily, gladiola, hydrangea, tulip, bougainvillea, geranium, alcatraz and aretillo. Not to mention the vegetables and fruit trees that are part of the vegetation community as maize, smells at night, popuchu, quintoniles, squash, mustard, chard, orange, banana, sweet lemon, black sapote, sapodilla, avocado, loquat, tangerine, peach and coffee for this crop is usually managed under shade (trees that used for shade are: banana, orange and cedar).

=== Fauna ===
The fauna of this area is varied. Due to conservation in some communities, its forests are rich in wildlife with a great diversity of wildlife. In some areas, these animals are threatened by the destruction of natural ecosystems, although hunting of animals remains free because there are animals that damage crops. Wild animals that can be found in Chinantequilla include, Squirrels, brocket deers, badgers, pigs, birds, turkeys, tepescuintles, armadillos, foxes, raccoons, tigers, opossums, gophers, ocelots, hawks, herons, coral snakes, sleepy parrots and panthers.

== Demography ==
According to the results of Census of Population and Housing 2010 by the National Institute of Statistics and Geography, the population of San Jose Chinantequilla is 507 inhabitants, of which 254 are men and 253 are women; so that 51% of the population are males, the rate population growth 2005 in 2010 was 4.2%, 46.6% of residents are under 15 years of age, while between that age and 84 years is 53.4% of the residents, and 91.7% of residents over age five are speakers of an Indian language. In 2010 this figure equates to a total of 416 inhabitants, of whom 204 are men and 197 women, 400 are bilingual to the Spanish, 5 are monolingual and 11 do not specify the condition of bilingualism.

Of the 416 indigenous language speakers, 411 are of Mixe, 4 Zapotec and 1 Mixtec. In addition, 12 did not specify their mother tongue.

== Administrative organization ==
San Jose Chinantequilla is an agency within the municipality of Totontepec Villa de Morelos. This is one of the 424 Municipalities of Oaxaca which make legal use of a system called Usos y costumbres, whereby the municipal authorities do not stick to the legal systems of the rest of state and the country, but rather to the ancient traditions of the inhabitants of the region. The city agency is made up of a municipal police officer, an alderman who is in charge of organizing the traditional festivals and a secretary, which controls documentation. All of these activities are regulated by the administration of Totontepec Villa de Morelos.

== Economic activities ==
Economic activities that are practiced in this community include production and marketing of the primary sector. Most of the inhabitants of this municipality are engaged in agriculture involving the cultivation of corn, beans, bananas, fruit and vegetable production as well as brandy.

== Social infrastructure ==
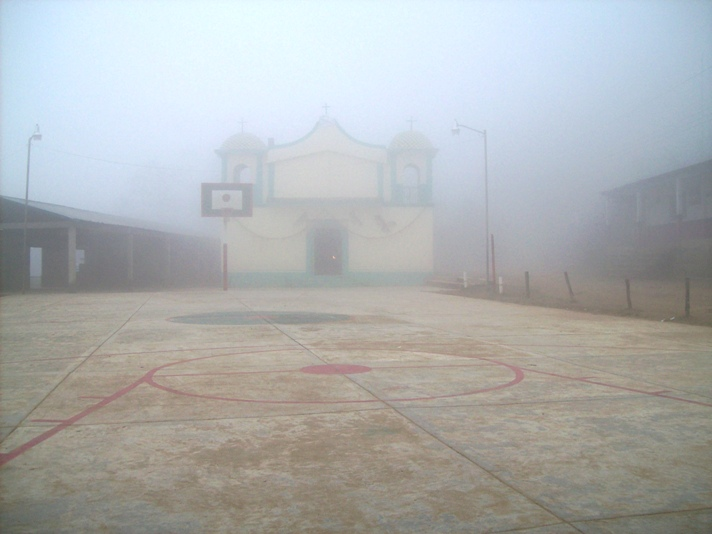
Basketball court and esplanade by San Jose Chinantequilla.

=== Abast ===
There are no public or flea markets so that people are supplied by the surrounding street market and commodities are purchased in small miscellaneous blocks.

=== Sports ===
The main sport practiced in the area is basketball, and there are 2 courts in the town.

=== Housing ===
According to the results presented in the Second Census of Population and Housing in 2010, the municipality has a total of 440 houses of which 382 are inhabited.
