= Totontepec Mixe =

Mixe language spoken in Mexico

- North Highland Mixe
- Native to: Mexico
- Region: Northeastern Oaxaca
- Native speakers: (5,500 cited 2000)
- Language family: Mixe–Zoque: Mixean; Mixe; Totontepec Mixe

Language codes
- ISO 639-3: mto
- Glottolog: toto1305
- ELP: Totontepec Mixe

Totontepec Mixe, called North Highland Mixe in Wichmann (1995), is a Mixe language spoken in Mexico, in the town of Totontepec Villa de Morelos, Oaxaca.

== Phonology ==
Mixe phonology is notable due to its complex system of vowel duration contrasts in addition to glottalization. There is a palatalized series of all consonant phonemes (as in Russian, or Irish) and possibly a fortis/lenis distinction in the plosive series, the recognition of which however is obscured by a tendency towards allophonic voicing of consonants in voiced environments.

=== Consonants ===
	Bilabial		Dental		Alveolar		Retroflex		Palatal	Velar		Glottal	
	plain	pal.	plain	pal.	plain	pal.	plain	pal.	Palatal	plain	pal.	plain	pal.
Plosive	p /p/	py /pʲ/	t /t̪/	ty /t̪ʲ/						k /k/	ky /kʲ/		
Affricate					ts /ts/	tsy /tsʲ/							
Fricative	w /β/	wy /βʲ/			s /s/		x /ʂ/	xy /ʂʲ/				j /h/	jy /hʲ/
Nasal	m /m/	my /mʲ/			n /n/	ny /nʲ/							
Rhotic					r /r/								
Lateral					l /l/								
Approximant	(w)	(wʲ)							y /j/				

/β, βʲ/ are heard as glides [w, wʲ] in other dialects.

Palatalized sounds /tsʲ, nʲ/ can also have allophones as [tʃ, ɲ] in free variation.

Sounds /p, t̪, k/ occur as [β, d̪, ɡ] in intervocalic position.

=== Vowels ===
Syllable nuclei vary in length and phonation. Most descriptions report three contrastive vowel lengths. The other types of phonation have been variously termed checked vowels, creaky voice vowels and breathy voice vowels.

The table below illustrates the vowel phonemes for Ayöök, orthographic symbols on the left.

		Short			Long			Overlong		
		Front	Central	Back	Front	Central	Back	Front	Central	Back
Close (high)	Modal	i /i/	ï /ɨ/	u /u/	ii /iː/	ïï /ɨ/	uu /uː/			
Close (high)	Glottalized	i’ /ḭ/	ï’ /ɨ̰/	u’ /ṵ/	ii’ /ḭː/	ïï’ /ɨ̰ː/	uu’ /ṵː/	i’i	ï’ï	u’u
Close-mid	Modal	e /e/	ë /ə/	o /o/	ee /eː/	ëë /əː/	oo /oː/			
Close-mid	Glottalized	e’ /ḛ/	ë’ /ə̰/	o’ /o̰/	ee’ /ḛː/	ëë’ /ə̰ː/	oo’ /o̰ː/	e’e	ë’ë	o’o
Open-mid	Modal	ä /æ/			ää /æː/					
Open-mid	Glottalized	ä’ /æ̰/			ää’ /æ̰ː/			ä’ä		
Open (low)	Modal		a /a/			aa /aː/				
Open (low)	Glottalized		a’ /a̰/			aa’ /a̰ː/			a’a	
