= Zoogocho Zapotec =

Zapotec language of Oaxaca, Mexico

- (San Bartolomé Zoogocho)
- Diža'xon
- Pronunciation: [diʒaʔˈʐon]
- Native to: Mexico
- Region: Northern Oaxaca
- Native speakers: (1,400 cited ca. 1991) (1,000 in Mexico)
- Language family: Oto-Manguean: Zapotecan; Zapotec; Sierra Norte; Zoogochoan; Zoogocho Zapotec
- Dialects: Zoogocho; Yalina; Tabehua

Language codes
- ISO 639-3: zpq
- Glottolog: zoog1238

Zoogocho Zapotec, or Diža'xon, is a Zapotec language of Oaxaca, Mexico.

It is spoken in San Bartolomé Zoogocho, Oaxaca, Santa María Yalina, Tabehua, and Oaxaca City.

As of 2013, about 1,500 "Zoogochenses" live in Los Angeles, California. Classes are held in the MacArthur Park neighborhood to preserve the Zoogocho Zapotec language.

The language is also known as Tabehua, Yalina, Zapoteco de San Bartolomé Zoogocho, and Zoogocho.

== Phonology ==
=== Vowels ===
	Front	Back
Close	i	(u)
Mid	e	o
Open	a	

There are a total of five vowels in San Bartolomé Zoogocho Zapotec. The vowel /u/ only appears in loanwords. Phonation types include: VV, VhV, V'. VV stands for double vowels that are pronounced with creaky voice, vowels with an /h/ between them are pronounced with breathy voice and vowels such as V' are checked vowels.

=== Tones ===
Tones include high, mid, low, rising and falling. Lower tonal qualities are seen more commonly in breathy tones, while checked vowels have a higher tone quality. Although it's common for breathy to have a lower tones and checked vowels commonly have higher tones, this is considered a distinct phenomenon and tone can't be predicted based on phonation types.

Example: yáhà 'weapon’

=== Stress ===
In Zoogocho Zapotec, stress is most commonly found on the penultimate syllable of a stem. In words consisting of two roots, the stress (accent) will fall on the second root.

Example: niihe 'nixtamal'; yeten 'the tortilla'

=== Syllable Structure ===
Syllables are created according to the pattern (C)CV(V)(C)(C). Vowels in a syllable may carry any phonation type.

=== Consonants ===
		Labial	Alveolar	Palatal	Retroflex	Velar	Labio- velar	Uvular	Glottal
Plosive	voiceless	p	t			k	kʷ		ʔ
Plosive	voiced	b	d			ɡ			
Affricate	voiceless			tʃ					
Affricate	voiced			dʒ					
Fricative	voiceless		s	ʃ	ʂ				
Fricative	voiced		z	ʒ	ʐ			ʁ	
Nasal	voiced	m	n						
Nasal	voiceless		n̥						
Rhotic			(ɾ)						
Lateral	voiced		l						
Lateral	voiceless		l̥						
Approximant				j			w		

A few sounds also occur in loanwords from Spanish: /f/, /ɾ/, /ɲ/, /x/, /r/, /ɲ/, and /x/.

== Morphology ==
=== Nominal Morphology ===
Nominal means to be categorized in a group of nouns and adjectives, the morphology occurs in a noun phrase.

x-migw=a'
POSS-friend=1SG
'my friend'

x-kuzh lalo
POSS-pig lalo
'Lalo’s pig'

x-dao=be'
POSS-corn.tassel=3SG.INF
'his corn tassel'

==== Possession ====
Possession is indicated by placing the possessor or possessive pronoun after the item possessed (Inherent possession is the items being possessed) which is marked prenominally with prefix x-, the possessed nominal then is developed by a pronominal clitic or noun phrase.

==== Pronominal Clitic ====
Or noun phrase is pronounced like an affix. Clitics play a syntactic role at the phrase level.

=== Verbal Morphology ===
No tense in this language. Zoogocho Zapotec relies on 'temporal particles' za, ba, na, gxe, or neghe.

==== Primary Aspect ====
Events that are still occurring, occurred, or will occur over a period of time. The continuative aspect of the examples is dx-.

dx-e-ban-e' yogo zhaha
CONT-FREQ-wake=3F every day
'She wakes up every day.'

bi dx-aog zxoana
what CONT-eat Juan
'What is Juan eating?'

The completive aspect is usually marked as b-, gw-, gud-, or g-. This aspect reflects the completion of the event occurred.

b-e-ban=e'
COMP-FREQ-wake=3F
'She used to wake up.'

ga gud-ao=be' yet
where COMP-eat=3SG.INF tortilla
'Where did he eat the tortilla?'

The potential aspect refers to an event that has not yet happened or an event that has not been specified. This aspect is marked by gu- or gw-.

gw-e-ban=e'
POT-FREQ-wake=3F
'She will wake up.'

dx-bez=a’ w-aow bidao yeth
CONT-hope=1SG POT-eat child tortilla
'I hope the kid eats the tortilla.'

bate' y-egh=o' nis
when POT-drink=2S water
'When are you going to drink water?'

The stative aspect is referred to as the prefix n- or by nothing at all. This aspect has multiple uses, such as, expressing the states and conditions and habitual meaning.

m-ban=a'
STAT-live=1SG
'I am alive.'

kuzh la n-dxe=be' ke?
pig FOC STAT-carry=3SG.INF no
'He’s carrying a pig, right?'

nake gud-itgh=le kate n-ak=le bidao=na'
how COMP-play=2PL when STAT-be=2PL child=DET
'How did you all use to play when you were children?'

Maria n-ak-dx=e' benhe zxen ka xoan
Maria HAB-be-more=3F person large than Juan
'Maria is larger than Juan.'

Table 4.1 Conjugation in gw-
	Conjugation in gw-
Potential	gw-
Completive	b-
Continuative	dx-
Stative	n-

== Orthography ==
=== Dillawalhall Zapotec Alphabet ===
a, b, ch, chh, d, e, f, g, i, j, k, l, ll, lh, m, n, nh, o, p, r, rh, s, sh, t, u, w, x, xh, y, z.

=== Vowels ===
Vowels are as follows.

Letter(s)	Example
A/a, E/e, I/i, O/o	ba "grave", de "ash", bi "No, negation", do "rope"
A'/a', E'/e', I'/i', O'/o'	la' "Oaxaca", ye' "skin disease", li' "sting", yo' "home"
A'A, a'a, E'E, e'e, I'I, i'i O'O/u'u	za'a "corn", ze'e "wall", zi'i "it is heavy", yo'o "let’s go"

=== Consonants ===
Consonants are as follows.

Letter(s)	Examples
B/b	beb "ash", bid "bug"
CH/ch	chop "two", bach "already"
CHH/chh	chhak "something being done", nhachh "then", chho' "tos"
D/d	da "see", de "ash", déd "away", dé "there"
F/f	yej fre "Brugmansia arborea"
G/g	ga "nine", bgab "ladder", go "sweet patato", nhaga' "my ear"
J/j	jed "hen", bej "well", jia "rooster", yetj "cane"
K/j	ka' "so", beko' "dog", ki "so", nhake' "is", nhaka' "am"
L/l	lao "aguave stalk flower", bel "snake", bél "fish", lí "certain"
LL/ll	lli' "down, south", lla "day", bell "tiger", yill "scar"
LH/lh	lhao (rhao) "your number", lhillo' (rhillo') "your house", lhe' (rhe') "you", zilh (zirh) "in the morning"
M/m (rare)	mechho "money", llome (llom) "basket", dam "owl"
N/n	na' "today, now", ne' "ten", bene' "person"
NH/nh	nhi "here", nhile "nixtamal", nha' "there", nholhe "mother", bnha' "I washed", benhi' "clarity"
P/p (rare)	padioxh "greeting", tap "four", pita' "rainbow"
R/r (In loanwords, rare)	eob "at", ros "pink, rice", rós "pink"
RH/rh (rare)	rhiz "little", rhito "daisy"
S/s	sib "high (wall, house, tree)", sa'o "piece of glass", bes "irrigation", bsa' "scrape/set in motion", nhis "water"
SH/sh	shi "10", sha' "casserole", shod (shud) "buzzard", gash "Amarillo", bsha' "changes"
T/t	tap "four", to "one", bat "when", btao "corn"
W/w	wí "orange", wag "firewood", wekoell "musician", weya' "dance", tawa' "my grandmother", wenllin "worker"
X/x	Xjollo' "Zoogocho", xao "your father", xop "six", bex "tomato", bxin "vulture", bxide' "scourer"
XH/xh	chiko' "your dog", xhis "barañas", bxhidw "kiss", xhiga' "jicara", xop "six"
Y/y	ya "iron", yag "tree", beye' "ice", laya' "my tooth", yade "Yaté"
Z/z	za "bean", beza' "vixen", nhez "path", bzinha' "mouse"

== Syntax ==
=== Sentence Structure ===
Zoogocho Zapotec normally uses the Verb–Subject–Object sentence structure. It is also possible to form Object–Verb–Subject or Subject–Verb–Object sentences.

Sentence Structure
Verb Subject Object (VSO)	Object Verb Subject (OVS)	Subject Verb Object (SVO)
dx-aogo be'ko' yet CONT-eat dog tortilla 'The dog is eating tortillas.'	yet dx-aogo be'ko' tortilla CONT-eat dog 'Tortillas, the dog is eating.'	be'ko'=n' dx-aogo yet dog=DET CONT-eat tortilla 'It’s the dog that’s eating tortillas.'

==== Noun Phrases ====
Adjective-Noun Order: The ordering of adjectives and nouns.

When asked to cite adjectives in isolation, native speakers will invariably put da, the inanimate classifier, in front of the adjective.

Da is used as an inanimate classifier, bi is a classifier for small things and be is an animate classifier. These three classifiers can be used in sentences when agreeing with the head noun.

==== Plural Markers ====
Ka can be used to mark a plural noun. Plural markers are not always present in plural noun phrases, and plurality can also be inferred from context or from verbal marking.

==== Demonstratives ====
Demonstratives follow their nouns, and either appear by themselves or with a classifier.

==== Determiners ====
The determiner is a clitic which has three main variants; en', which occurs following a non-nasal consonant, na' which occurs after noun phrases ending in /n/ or /n̥/, and n or na' which occur in free variation after vowels. Determiners occur at the end of a noun phrase.
