= Agustín Quintana =

Agustín Quintana (c. 1660 – 1734) was a missionary and philologist of indigenous languages.

== Biography ==
Born in Oaxaca, Mexico, he entered the Order of Preachers in 1688 and was soon sent as a missionary priest to the Mixe people of southern Oaxaca. He lived and worked among them for twenty-eight years, mastering their language to a degree never before attained by anyone of European descent.

He was later appointed superior of the convent of Zacavila, but soon retired to the main convent in Antequera due to poor health. He devoted the rest of his life to writing in the Mixe language which are the earliest publications in that language. In spite of age and infirmity, he made several journeys to Puebla to supervise publishing of his writing. His most noted works were a grammar and a series of essays on the principal articles of the Christian faith, under the title "Institución cristiana, que contiene el Arte de la Lengua Mije etc." (Puebla, 1729).
