= Tenseness =

Pronunciation of a sound with greater muscular effort than normal

In phonology, tenseness or tensing is, most generally, the pronunciation of a sound with greater muscular effort or constriction than is typical. More specifically, tenseness is the pronunciation of a vowel with less centralization (i.e. either more fronting or more backing), longer duration, and narrower mouth width (with the tongue being perhaps more raised) compared with another vowel. The opposite quality to tenseness is known as laxness or laxing: the pronunciation of a vowel with relatively more centralization, shorter duration, and more widening (perhaps even lowering).

Contrasts between two vowels on the basis of tenseness, and even phonemic contrasts, are common in many languages, including English. For example, in most English dialects, beet and bit are contrasted by the vowel sound being tense in the first word but not the second; i.e., /iː/ (as in beet) is the tense counterpart to the lax /ɪ/ (as in bit); the same is true of /uː/ (as in kook) versus /ʊ/ (as in cook). Unlike most distinctive features, the feature [tense] can be interpreted only relatively, often with a perception of greater tension or pressure in the mouth, which, in a language such as English, contrasts between two corresponding vowel types: a tense vowel and a lax vowel. An example in Vietnamese is the letters ă and â representing lax vowels, and the letters a and ơ representing the corresponding tense vowels. Some languages like Spanish are often considered as having only tense vowels, but since the quality of tenseness is not a phonemic feature in this language, it cannot be applied to describe its vowels in any meaningful way. The term has also occasionally been used to describe contrasts in consonants.

== Vowels ==
In general, tense vowels are more close (and correspondingly have lower first formants) than their lax counterparts. Tense vowels are sometimes claimed to be articulated with a more advanced tongue root than lax vowels, but this varies, and in some languages, it is the lax vowels that are more advanced, or a single language may be inconsistent between front and back or high and mid vowels. The traditional definition, that tense vowels are produced with more "muscular tension" than lax vowels, has not been confirmed by phonetic experiments. Another hypothesis is that lax vowels are more centralized than tense vowels. There are also linguists who believe that there is no phonetic correlation to the tense–lax opposition.

In many Germanic languages, such as RP English and Standard German, tense vowels are longer in duration than lax vowels, but in Scots, Scottish English, General American English, and Icelandic, there is no such correlation. The standard variety of Yiddish lacks a vowel length distinction entirely.

Germanic languages prefer tense vowels in open syllables (so-called free vowels) and lax vowels in closed syllables (so-called checked vowels).

== Consonants ==
Occasionally, tenseness has been used to distinguish pairs of contrasting consonants in languages.

Korean, for example, has a three-way contrast among unvoiced stops and affricates; the three series are often transcribed as:

	Bilabial	Alveolar	Alveolo- palatal	Velar
plain	ㅂ /p/	ㄷ /t/	ㅈ /t͡s/ or /t͡ɕ/	ㄱ /k/
tense	ㅃ /p͈/	ㄸ /t͈/	ㅉ /t͡s͈/ or /t͡ɕ͈/	ㄲ /k͈/
aspirated	ㅍ /pʰ/	ㅌ /tʰ/	ㅊ /t͡sʰ/ or /t͡ɕʰ/	ㅋ /kʰ/

The contrast between the [p] series and the [p͈] series is sometimes said to be a function of tenseness: the former are lax and the latter tense. In this case the definition of "tense" would have to include greater glottal tension.

In Ewe, /f/ and /v/ are articulated with strong articulation, [f͈] and [v͈], to better distinguish them from weaker /ɸ/ and /β/.

In some dialects of Irish and Scottish Gaelic, there is a contrast between [l, lʲ, n, nʲ] and [ɫˑ, ʎˑ, nˠˑ, ɲˑ]. Again, the former set have sometimes been described as lax and the latter set as tense. It is not clear what phonetic characteristics other than greater duration would then be associated with tenseness.

Some researchers have argued that the contrast in German, traditionally described as voice ([p t k] vs. [b d ɡ]), is in fact better analyzed as tenseness since the latter set is voiceless in Southern German. German linguists call the distinction fortis and lenis rather than tense and lax. Tenseness is especially used to explain stop consonants of the Alemannic German dialects because they have two series of them that are identically voiceless and unaspirated. However, it is debated whether the distinction is really a result of different muscular tension and not of gemination.

== See also ==
- Checked and free vowels
- Vowel reduction
- Fortis and lenis
- Trisyllabic laxing
