= Santa María Yalina =

- Municipality and town
- Location in Mexico
- Coordinates: 17°15′N 96°16′W
- Country: Mexico
- State: Oaxaca
- Time zone: UTC-6 (Central Standard Time)

Santa María Yalina is a town and municipality in Oaxaca in south-western Mexico. The municipality covers an area of 28.07 km^{2} (10.84 sq mi). It is part of the Villa Alta District in the center of the Sierra Norte Region.

== Demography ==
As of 2000, the municipality had a total population of 378.

Zoogocho Zapotec is spoken in the town.
