= PXM =

PXM may refer to:

- PXM, the IATA code for the Puerto Escondido International Airport
- pxm, the file extension used by the Pixelmator image editing software
- pxm, the ISO 639 code for the Quetzaltepec Mixe language, a variety of Midland Mixe
- PXM, the acronym for processor switch modules in computer networks
