= San Bartolomé Zoogocho =

- Municipality and town
- Location in Mexico
- Coordinates: 17°14′N 96°14′W
- Country: Mexico
- State: Oaxaca

Area
  - Total: 22.96 km^{2} (8.86 sq mi)

Population (2005)
  - Total: 381
- Time zone: UTC-6 (Central Standard Time)

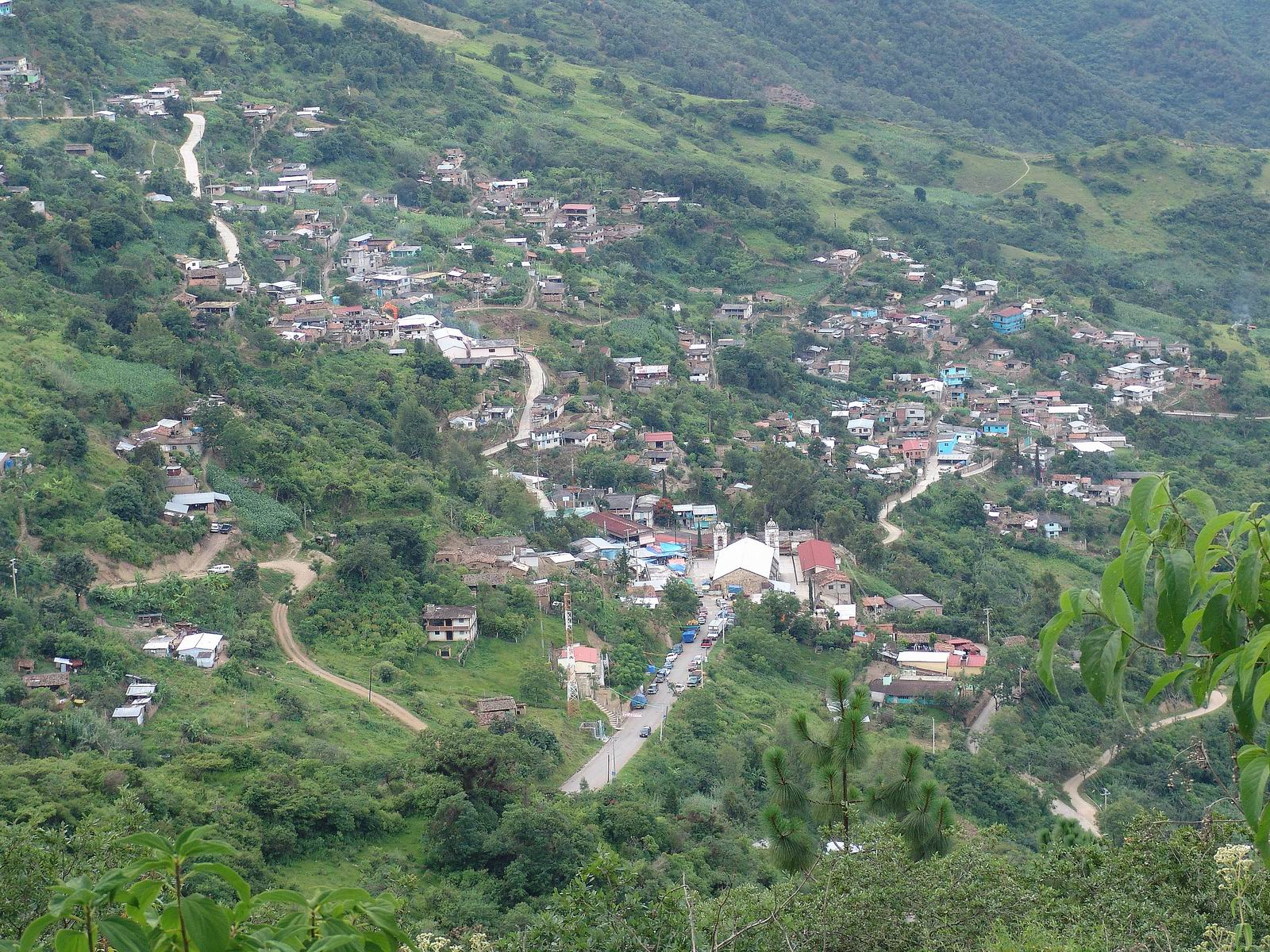
San Bartolomé Zoogocho

San Bartolomé Zoogocho is a town and municipality in Oaxaca in south-western Mexico. The municipality covers an area of 22.96 km^{2}. It is part of the Villa Alta District in the center of the Sierra Norte Region.

The traditional music is known as jarabe.

Mezcal is often made here and a big part of the culture.

As of 2005, the municipality had a total population of 381.

As of 2013, about 1,500 "Zoogochenses" live in Los Angeles, California, where classes are held to preserve the Zoogocho Zapotec language.
