= Ulterior Mixe =

Mixe language of Mexico

- Native to: Mexico
- Region: Northeastern Oaxaca
- Language family: Mixe–Zoque: Mixean; Mixe; Ulterior Mixe

Language codes
- ISO 639-3: None (mis)
- Glottolog: ulte1235

Ulterior Mixe is a divergent and recently described Mixe language spoken in Mexico.
