= Mixe languages =

Branch of the Mixe-Zoquean language family of Mexico

Mixe
- Oaxacan Mixean; Ayuujk
- Geographic distribution: Oaxaca, Mexico
- Ethnicity: Mixe people
- Native speakers: 140,000 (2020 census)
- Linguistic classification: Mixe–Zoque: Mixean; Mixe
- Subdivisions: Totontepec; Tlahuitoltepec; Midland; Isthmus; Ulterior Mixe

Language codes
- Glottolog: oaxa1241
- The Mixe region within the state of Oaxaca in southern Mexico

- People: Ayuujkjä'äy (Mixe)
- Language: Ayöök (Mixe)

The Mixe languages are languages of the Mixean branch of the Mixe–Zoquean language family indigenous to southern Mexico. According to a 1995 classification, there are seven of them (including one that is extinct). The four that are spoken in Oaxaca are commonly called Mixe while their two relatives spoken in Veracruz are commonly called "Popoluca", but sometimes also Mixe (these are "Oluta Popoluca" or "Olutec Mixe" and "Sayula Popoluca" or "Sayultec Mixe"). This article is about the Oaxaca Mixe languages, which their speakers call Ayöök, Ayuujk, Ayüük or Ayuhk.

Video on Mixe produced by UABJO

140,000 people reported their language to be "Mixe" in the 2020 census.

== Classification ==
Oaxaca Mixe languages are spoken in the Sierra Mixe of eastern Oaxaca. These four languages are: North Highland Mixe, spoken around Totontepec (the most divergent); South Highland Mixe, spoken around Santa María Tlahuitoltepec, Ayutla and Tamazulapan); Midland Mixe, spoken around Juquila and Zacatepec; and Lowland Mixe, spoken in San Juan Guichicovi (this language is also known as "Isthmus Mixe").

The following classification is from Wichmann (1995:9).

Mixe (Oaxacan Mixean)

- North Highland Mixe (Totontepec)
- South Highland Mixe (Tlahuitoltepec)
  - Core (Tlahuitoltepec, Ayutla, Tamazulapan)
  - Fringe (Tepuxtepec, Tepantlali, Mixistlán)
- Midland Mixe
  - North Midland Mixe (Jaltepec, Puxmetacan, Matamoros, Cotzocón)
  - South Midland Mixe (Juquila, Cacalotepec)
- Lowland Mixe (Camotlán, San José El Paraíso / Coatlán, Mazatlán, Guichicovi)

Wichmann (2008) adds Ulterior Mixe as an additional branch:

Mixe

- Totontepec Mixe
- Ulterior Mixe
- Lowland – Midland Mixe – South Highland
  - Tlahuitoltepec Mixe
  - Lowland–Midland Mixe
    - Midland Mixe
      - Juquila Mixe
      - North Central Mixe
    - Lowland Mixe
      - Coatlán Mixe
      - Isthmus Mixe (Guichicovi)
      - Mazatlán Mixe

== Phonology ==
The phonology of Mixe languages is remarkable due to their complex system of vowel duration contrasts in addition to glottalization. There is a palatalized series of all consonant phonemes (as in Ukrainian, Polish or Irish) and possibly a fortis/lenis distinction in the plosive series, the recognition of which however is obscured by a tendency towards allophonic voicing of consonants in voiced environments.

The tables below illustrate the phonemes for Ayöök (Totontepec) Mixe:

=== Vowels ===
Syllable nuclei vary in length and phonation. Most descriptions report three contrastive vowel lengths. The other types of phonation have been variously termed checked vowels, creaky voice vowels and breathy voice vowels.

| | Short | | | Long | | |
| | Front | Central | Back | Front | Central | Back |
|---|---|---|---|---|---|---|
| High | i /i/ | ï /ɨ/ | u /u/ | ii /iː/ | ïï /ɨ/ | uu /uː/ |
| Close-mid | e /e/ | ë /ə/ | o /o/ | ee /eː/ | ëë /əː/ | oo /oː/ |
| Open-mid | ä /æ/ | | | ää /æː/ | | |
| Low (open) | | a /a/ | | | aa /aː/ | |

=== Consonants ===
| | Labial | | Alveolar | | Retroflex | | Palatal | Velar | | Glottal | |
| | plain | pal. | plain | pal. | plain | pal. | plain | plain | pal. | plain | pal. |
|---|---|---|---|---|---|---|---|---|---|---|---|
| Nasal | m | mʲ | n | nʲ | | | | | | | |
| Plosive | p | pʲ | t | tʲ | | | | k | kʲ | | |
| Affricate | | | t͡s | t͡sʲ | | | | | | | |
| Fricative | β | βʲ | s (Note: Used only in loanwords and onomatopoeia.) | | ʂ | ʂʲ | | | | h | hʲ |
| Trill | | | r | | | | | | | | |
| Approximant | | | l | | | | j | | | | |

== Grammar ==
=== Verbs ===
The morphosyntactic alignment of Mixe is ergative and it also has an obviative system which serves to distinguish between verb participants in reference to its direct–inverse system. The Mixe verb is complex and inflects for many categories and also shows a lot of derivational morphology. One of the parameters of verb inflection is whether a verb occurs in an independent or dependent clause; this distinction is marked by both differential affixation and stem ablaut. Unlike Sayultec Mixe (spoken in the neighboring state of Veracruz), Mixe languages of Oaxaca only mark one argument on the verb: either the object or the subject of the verb depending on whether the verb is in the direct or inverse form. Mixe shows a wide variety of possibilities for noun incorporation.

=== Nouns ===
The Mixe noun does not normally inflect, except that human nouns inflect for plural. To indicate the plural, the enclitic ëch is added to the noun. Noun compounding is a very productive process, and the profuse derivational morphology allows for creation of new nouns both from verbs and from other nouns.

=== Syntax ===
Mixe languages have SOV constituent order. Prepositions and genitives precede the noun, but relative clauses follow the noun.

== Sample ==
This sample is from Lowland Mixe:

pwes hadu'n idaa yɨyoop jɨyäj idaa aldeano mɨɨt ytöxyijk ytɨkoy yɨ mɨkü
[pwes haduʔn ʔidaː ʲ-ʔɨjoːb hɨjaʔaj ʔidaː ʔaldeano mɨːd ʲ-toʔoʃʲɨʰk ʲtɨɡoˑjʲ jɨ mɨkuʔu]
Well there this 3P-poor person this {ranch hand} with 3P.POSS-woman 3P-CAUS/PAS-lose-DEP the devil
"Well that's how this poor person, this ranch hand with his wife, made the devil lose"

== Radio ==
Mixe-language programming is carried by the CDI's radio station XEGLO, based in Guelatao de Juárez, Oaxaca.

== See also ==
- Agustín Quintana

== Bibliography ==
- Dieterman, Julia Irene, 1995, Participant reference in Isthmus Mixe Narrative Discourse, MA. Thesis in linguistics presented to the Faculty of the Graduate school of the University of Texas at Arlington.
- Hoogshagen, Searle & Hilda Halloran Hoogshagen, 1993, Diccionario Mixe de Coatlán, Serie de Vocabularios Indigénas "Mariano Silva y Aceves" Num. 32. SIL, Mexico, D.F.
- Kroeger, Paul R. 2005. Analyzing grammar: an introduction. Cambridge University Press.
- Schoenhals, Alvin & Louise Schoenhals, 1965, Vocabulario Mixe de Totontepec, Serie de Vocabularios Indigénas "Mariano Silva y Aceves" Num. 14. SIL, Mexico, D.F.
- Wichmann, Søren, 1995, The Relationship Among the Mixe–Zoquean Languages of Mexico. University of Utah Press. Salt Lake City. ISBN 0-87480-487-6
- JANY, C. (2013). Defining Nominal Comp as a P WORD-FORMATION PROCESS IN CHUXNABÁN MIXE. International Journal of American Linguistics, 79(4), 533–553.
