= Vowel length =

Duration of a vowel sound

Long

◌ː
- IPA number: 503

Encoding
- Entity (decimal): &#720;
- Unicode (hex): U+02D0

Half-long

◌ˑ
- IPA number: 504

Encoding
- Entity (decimal): &#721;
- Unicode (hex): U+02D1

Extra-short

◌̆
- IPA number: 505

Encoding
- Entity (decimal): &#774;
- Unicode (hex): U+0306

In linguistics, vowel length is the perceived or actual duration of a vowel sound when pronounced. A vowel sound perceived as shorter is often called a short vowel and one perceived as longer called a long vowel.

On one hand, many languages do not distinguish vowel length phonemically, meaning that vowel length alone does not change the meanings of words. However, the amount of time a vowel is uttered can change based on factors such as the phonetic characteristics of the sounds around it: its phonetic environment. An example is that vowels tend to be pronounced longer before a voiced consonant and shorter before a voiceless consonant in the standard accents of American and British English (a feature called pre-fortis clipping).

On the other hand, vowel length is indeed an important phonemic factor in certain languages, meaning vowel length can change word-meanings, for example in Arabic, Czech, Dravidian languages (such as Tamil), some Finno-Ugric languages (such as Finnish and Estonian), Japanese, Kyrgyz, Samoan, and Xhosa. Some languages in the past likely had the distinction even though their modern descendants do not, with an example being Latin versus its descendent Romance languages like Spanish and French. Length also plays a lesser phonetic role in Cantonese, unlike in other varieties of Chinese, which do not have phonemic vowel length distinctions.

Whether vowel length alone changes word-meanings in English depends on the particular dialect; it is able to do so in a few non-rhotic dialects, such as Australian English, Lunenburg English, New Zealand English, South African English, and possibly some (vernacular) English of Southern England. For instance, vowel length can distinguish park /paːk/ from puck /pak/ in Australian and New Zealand English, or bared /beːd/ from bed /bed/ in any of these dialects. Phonemic vowel length perhaps marginally occurs in a few rhotic dialects too, such as Scottish English and Northern Irish English (see Scottish vowel length rule).

Languages that do distinguish vowel length phonemically usually only distinguish between short vowels and long vowels. Very few languages distinguish three phonemic vowel lengths; some that do so are Estonian, Luiseño, and Mixe. However, languages with two vowel lengths may permit words in which two adjacent vowels are of the same quality: Japanese ほうおう, hōō, "phoenix", or Ancient Greek ἀάατος [a.áː.a.tos], "inviolable". Some languages that do not ordinarily have phonemic vowel length but permit vowel hiatus may similarly exhibit sequences of identical vowel phonemes that yield phonetically long vowels, such as Georgian გააადვილებ, gaaadvileb [ɡa.a.ad.vil.eb], "you will facilitate it".

== Related features ==
Stress is often reinforced by allophonic vowel length, especially when it is lexical. For example, French long vowels are always in stressed syllables. Finnish, a language with two phonemic lengths, indicates the stress by adding allophonic length, which gives four distinctive lengths and five physical lengths: short and long stressed vowels, short and long unstressed vowels, and a half-long vowel, which is a short vowel found in a syllable immediately preceded by a stressed short vowel: i-so.

Among the languages with distinctive vowel length, there are some in which it may occur only in stressed syllables, such as in Alemannic German, Scottish Gaelic and Egyptian Arabic. In languages such as Czech, Finnish, some Irish dialects and Classical Latin, vowel length is distinctive also in unstressed syllables.

In some languages, vowel length is sometimes better analyzed as a sequence of two identical vowels. In Finnic languages, such as Finnish, the simplest example follows from consonant gradation: haka → haan. In some cases, it is caused by a following chroneme, which is etymologically a consonant: jää "ice" ← Proto-Uralic *jäŋe. In non-initial syllables, it is ambiguous if long vowels are vowel clusters; poems written in the Kalevala meter often syllabicate between the vowels, and an (etymologically original) intervocalic -h- is seen in that and some modern dialects (taivaan vs. taivahan "of the sky"). Morphological treatment of diphthongs is essentially similar to long vowels. Some old Finnish long vowels have developed into diphthongs, but successive layers of borrowing have introduced the same long vowels again so the diphthong and the long vowel now again contrast (nuotti "musical note" vs. nootti "diplomatic note").

In Japanese, most long vowels are the results of the phonetic change of diphthongs; au and ou became ō, iu became yū, eu became yō, and now ei is becoming ē. The change also occurred after the loss of intervocalic phoneme /h/. For example, modern Kyōto (Kyoto) has undergone a shift: /kjauto/ → /kjoːto/. Another example is shōnen (boy): /seuneɴ/ → /sjoːneɴ/ [ɕoːneɴ].

== Phonemic vowel length ==
As noted above, only relatively few of the world's languages make a phonemic distinction between long and short vowels. Some families have many such languages, examples being the Dravidian languages and the Finno-Ugric languages. Other languages have fewer relatives with vowel length, including Arabic, Japanese, and Scottish Gaelic. There are also older languages such as Ancient Greek, Biblical Hebrew, and Latin which have phonemic vowel length but no descendants that preserve it.

In Latin and Hungarian, some long vowels are analyzed as separate phonemes from short vowels:

Latin vowels (Note: one possible reconstruction; see Latin phonology and orthography § Vowels for more information)
	Front		Central		Back	
	short	long	short	long	short	long
High	/ɪ/	/iː/			/ʊ/	/uː/
Mid	/ɛ/	/eː/			/ɔ/	/oː/
Low			/a/	/aː/		

Hungarian vowels
	Front				Central	Back	
	unrounded		rounded		Central	Back	
	short	long	short	long	long	short	long
High	/i/	/iː/	/y/	/yː/		/u/	/uː/
Mid	/ɛ/	/eː/	/ø/	/øː/		/o/	/oː/
Low					/aː/	/ɒ/	

Vowel length contrasts with more than two phonemic levels are rare, and several hypothesized cases of three-level vowel length can be analysed without postulating this typologically unusual configuration. Estonian has three distinctive lengths, but the third is suprasegmental, as it has developed from the allophonic variation caused by now-deleted grammatical markers. For example, half-long 'aa' in saada comes from the agglutination *saa+tta+k */sɑːtˑɑk/ "send (saatta-) +(imperative)", and the overlong 'aa' in saada comes from *saa+dak "get+(infinitive)". As for languages that have three lengths, independent of vowel quality or syllable structure, these include Dinka, Mixe, Yavapai and Wichita. An example from Mixe is [poʃ] "guava", [poˑʃ] "spider", [poːʃ] "knot". In Dinka the longest vowels are three moras long, and so are best analyzed as overlong e.g. /oːː/.

Four-way distinctions have been claimed, but these are actually long-short distinctions on adjacent syllables. For example, in Kikamba, there is [ko.ko.na], [kóó.ma̋], [ko.óma̋], [nétónubáné.éetɛ̂] "hit", "dry", "bite", "we have chosen for everyone and are still choosing".

== By language ==
=== In English ===
==== Allophonic vowel length ====
In most varieties of English, for instance Received Pronunciation and General American, there is allophonic variation in vowel length depending on the value of the consonant that follows it: vowels are shorter before voiceless consonants and are longer when they come before voiced consonants. Thus, the vowel in bad /bæd/ is longer than the vowel in bat /bæt/. Also compare neat /niːt/ with need /niːd/. The vowel sound in "beat" is generally pronounced for about 190 milliseconds, but the same vowel in "bead" lasts 350 milliseconds in normal speech, the voiced final consonant influencing vowel length.

==== Contrastive vowel length ====
Whether vowel length alone changes word-meanings in English depends on the particular dialect; it is able to do so in a few non-rhotic dialects, such as Australian English, Lunenburg English, New Zealand English, South African English, and possibly some (vernacular) English of Southern England. For instance, vowel length can distinguish park /paːk/ from puck /pak/ in Australian and New Zealand English, or bared /beːd/ from bed /bed/ in any of these dialects. Phonemic vowel length perhaps marginally occurs in a few rhotic dialects too, such as Scottish English and Northern Irish English (see Scottish vowel length rule).

In Australian English, there is contrastive vowel length in closed syllables between long and short /e/ and /ɐ/. The following are minimal pairs of length:

/ˈfeɹiː/ ferry	/ˈfeːɹiː/ fairy
/ˈkɐt/ cut	/ˈkɐːt/ cart

Cockney English features short and long varieties of the closing diphthong [ɔʊ]. The short [ɔʊ] corresponds to RP /ɔː/ in morphologically closed syllables (see thought split), whereas the long [ɔʊː] corresponds to the non-prevocalic sequence /ɔːl/ (see l-vocalization). The following are minimal pairs of length:

[ˈfɔʊʔ] fort/fought	[ˈfɔʊːʔ] fault
[ˈpɔʊz] pause	[ˈpɔʊːz] Paul's
[ˈwɔʊʔə] water	[ˈwɔʊːʔə] Walter

The difference is lost in running speech, so that fault falls together with fort and fought as [ˈfɔʊʔ] or [ˈfoːʔ]. The contrast between the two diphthongs is phonetic rather than phonemic, as the /l/ can be restored in formal speech: [ˈfoːɫt] etc., which suggests that the underlying form of [ˈfɔʊːʔ] is /ˈfoːlt/ (John Wells says that the vowel is equally correctly transcribed with ⟨ɔʊ⟩ or ⟨oʊ⟩, not to be confused with GOAT /ʌʊ/, [ɐɤ]). Furthermore, a vocalized word-final /l/ is often restored before a word-initial vowel, so that fall out [fɔʊl ˈæəʔ] (cf. thaw out [fɔəɹ ˈæəʔ], with an intrusive /r/) is somewhat more likely to contain the lateral [l] than fall [fɔʊː]. The distinction between [ɔʊ] and [ɔʊː] exists only word-internally before consonants other than intervocalic /l/. In the morpheme-final position only [ɔʊː] occurs (with the THOUGHT vowel being realized as [ɔə ~ ɔː ~ ɔʊə]), so that all [ɔʊː] is always distinct from or [ɔə]. Before the intervocalic /l/ [ɔʊː] is the banned diphthong, though here either of the THOUGHT vowels can occur, depending on morphology (compare falling [ˈfɔʊlɪn] with aweless [ˈɔəlɪs]).

In Cockney, the main difference between /ɪ/ and /ɪə/, /e/ and /eə/ as well as /ɒ/ and /ɔə/ is length, not quality, so that his [ɪz], merry [ˈmɛɹɪi] and Polly [ˈpɒlɪi ~ ˈpɔlɪi] differ from here's [ɪəz ~ ɪːz], Mary [ˈmɛəɹɪi ~ ˈmɛːɹɪi] and poorly [ˈpɔəlɪi ~ ˈpɔːlɪi] (see cure-force merger) mainly in length. In broad Cockney, the contrast between /æ/ and /æʊ/ is also mainly one of length; compare hat [æʔ] with out [æəʔ ~ æːʔ] (cf. the near-RP form [æʊʔ], with a wide closing diphthong).

==== Other linguistic vowel categorizations into "short" and "long" ====
In many varieties of English, vowels contrast with each other both in length and in quality, and descriptions differ in the relative importance given to these two features. Some descriptions of Received Pronunciation and more widely some descriptions of English phonology group all non-diphthongal vowels into the categories "long" and "short", convenient terms for grouping the many vowels of English. Daniel Jones proposed that phonetically similar pairs of long and short vowels could be grouped into single phonemes, distinguished by the presence or absence of phonological length (chroneme). The usual long-short pairings for RP are /iː + ɪ/, /ɑː + æ/, /ɜ: + ə/, /ɔː + ɒ/, /u + ʊ/, but Jones omits /ɑː + æ/. This approach is not found in present-day descriptions of English. Vowels show allophonic variation in length and also in other features according to the context in which they occur. The terms tense (corresponding to long) and lax (corresponding to short) are alternative terms that do not directly refer to length.

==== "Long" and "short" vowel letters in spelling and the classroom teaching of reading ====
In the teaching of English, vowels are commonly said to have a "short" and a "long" version. These correspond to checked and free vowels, respectively. The terms "short" and "long" are not accurate from a linguistic point of view—at least in the case of Modern English—as the vowels are not actually short and long versions of the same sound, and many of the "long vowels" are actually diphthongs; the terminology is a historical holdover due to their arising from proper vowel length in Middle English. The phonemic values of these vowel pairings are shown in the table below.

Grapheme	Checked ("short")		Free ("long")	
Grapheme	Phoneme	Example	Phoneme	Example
⟨a⟩	/æ/	mat /mæt/	/eɪ/	mate /meɪt/
⟨e⟩	/ɛ/	pet /pɛt/	/iː/	Pete /piːt/
⟨i⟩	/ɪ/	twin /twɪn/	/aɪ/	twine /twaɪn/
⟨o⟩	/ɒ/	not /nɒt/	/oʊ/	note /noʊt/
⟨oo⟩	/ʊ/	wood /wʊd/	/uː/	wooed /wuːd/
⟨u⟩	/ʌ/	cub /kʌb/	/juː/	cube /kjuːb/

As can be seen in the table above, the silent e at the end of a word often orthographically indicates the use of one of these "long" vowels, and its absence often indicates the use of a "short" vowel. This is not universal, however; exceptions exist where the phonemic value cannot be determined by a rule of spelling alone (e.g. foot /fʊt/, wood /wʊd/ vs. food /fuːd/, woot /wuːt/; one /wʌn/ vs. gone /ɡɒn/ vs. tone /toʊn/), there are a plethora of other ways for both sets of vowel sounds to be spelled in English, and not all vowel sounds in English fit into a pairing (notably /ə/, /ɑː/, /ɔː/, /aʊ/, /ɔɪ/).

In a phonetic transcription system that uses pronunciation respelling, "long" and "short" vowel letters are written in a form a normal reader of the language would unambiguously know how to pronounce; e.g. "ay" or "ey" are used for /eɪ/ (a long "a"), and "ee" or "iy" are used for /iː/ (a long "i"). Whilst many dictionaries use pronunciation respelling, other dictionaries, notably the Merriam-Webster, use a macron over a vowel to indicate a long vowel; for example, ⟨ā⟩ is be used to represent the IPA sound /eɪ/, or a breve to indicate a short vowel (e.g. ⟨ă⟩ to represent the IPA sound /æ/), as is used in the American Heritage Dictionary. See Pronunciation respelling for English for a comprehensive comparative table of pronunciation respelling systems for English.

== Origin ==
Vowel length may often be traced to assimilation. In Australian English, the second element [ə] of a diphthong [eə] has assimilated to the preceding vowel, giving the pronunciation of bared as [beːd], creating a contrast with the short vowel in bed [bed].

Another common source is the vocalization of a consonant such as the voiced velar fricative [ɣ] or voiced palatal fricative or, in fact, an approximant (such as the typical realisation of the English diaphoneme /r/). A historically important example is the laryngeal theory, which states that long vowels in the Indo-European languages were formed from short vowels, followed by any one of the several "laryngeal" sounds of Proto-Indo-European (conventionally written h_{1}, h_{2} and h_{3}). When a laryngeal sound followed a vowel, it was later lost in most Indo-European languages, and the preceding vowel became long. However, Proto-Indo-European had long vowels of other origins as well, usually as the result of older sound changes, such as Szemerényi's law and Stang's law.

Vowel length may also have arisen as an allophonic quality of a single vowel phoneme, which may have then become split in two phonemes. For example, the Australian English phoneme /æː/ was created by the incomplete application of a rule extending /æ/ before certain voiced consonants, a phenomenon known as the bad–lad split. An alternative pathway to the phonemicization of allophonic vowel length is the shift of a vowel of a formerly-different quality to become the short counterpart of a vowel pair. That too is exemplified by Australian English, whose contrast between /a/ (as in duck) and /aː/ (as in dark) was brought about by a lowering of the earlier /ʌ/.

Estonian, a Finnic language, has a rare phenomenon in which allophonic length variation has become phonemic after the deletion of the suffixes causing the allophony. Estonian had already inherited two vowel lengths from Proto-Finnic, but a third one was then introduced. For example, the Finnic imperative marker *-k caused the preceding vowels to be articulated shorter. After the deletion of the marker, the allophonic length became phonemic, as shown in the example above.

== Notations ==
=== Latin alphabet ===
==== IPA ====
In the International Phonetic Alphabet the sign U+02D0 ː MODIFIER LETTER TRIANGULAR COLON (not a typical double-dot colon, but two triangles facing each other in an hourglass shape) is used for both vowel and consonant length. This may be doubled for an extra-long sound, or the top half (ˑ) may be used to indicate that a sound is "half-long". A breve is used to mark an extra-short vowel or consonant.

Estonian has a three-way phonemic contrast:

saada [saːːda] "to get" (overlong)
saada [saːda] "send!" (long)
sada [sada] "hundred" (short)

Although not phonemic, a half-long distinction can also be illustrated in certain accents of English:

bead [biːd]
beat [biˑt]
bid [bɪˑd]
bit [bɪt]

==== Diacritics ====
- Macron (ā), used to indicate a long vowel in Māori, Hawaiian, Samoan, Latvian and many transcription schemes, including romanizations for Sanskrit and Arabic, the Hepburn romanization for Japanese, and Yale for Korean. While not part of their standard orthography, the macron is used as a teaching aid in modern Latin and Ancient Greek textbooks. Macron is also used in modern official Cyrillic orthographies of some minority languages (Mansi, Kildin Sami, Evenki).
- Breves (ă) are used to mark short vowels in several linguistic transcription systems, as well as in Vietnamese and Alvarez-Hale's orthography for O'odham.
- Acute accent (á), used to indicate a long vowel in Czech, Slovak, Old Norse, Hungarian, Irish, traditional Scottish Gaelic (for long [oː] ó, [eː] é, as opposed to [ɛː] è, [ɔː] ò) and pre-20th-century transcriptions of Sanskrit, Arabic, etc.
  - An apex, which was a light acute accent that was angled lower and aligned with a letter's right, was used in Classical Latin. (However, for I, a taller ꟾ was sometimes used instead.)
- Circumflex (â), used for example in Welsh. The circumflex is occasionally used as a surrogate for the macrons, particularly in Hawaiian and in the Kunrei-shiki romanization of Japanese, or in transcriptions of Old High German. In transcriptions of Middle High German, a system where inherited lengths are marked with the circumflex and new lengths with the macron is occasionally used.
- Grave accent (à) is used in Scottish Gaelic, with a e i o u. (In traditional spelling, [ɛː] is è and [ɔː] is ò as in gnè, pòcaid, Mòr (personal name), while [eː] is é and [oː] is ó, as in dé, mór.)
- Ogonek (ą), used in Lithuanian to indicate long vowels.
- Trema (ä), used in Aymara to indicate long vowels.
- Kroužek (ů), used in Czech for the long U sound, e.g., kůň "horse". (It actually developed from the ligature "uo", which noted the diphthong /uo/ until it shifted to /uː/.)

==== Additional letters ====
- Vowel doubling, used consistently in Estonian, Finnish, Lombard, Navajo and Somali, and in closed syllables in Dutch, Afrikaans, and West Frisian. Example: Finnish tuuli /ˈtuːli/ 'wind' vs. tuli /ˈtuli/ 'fire'.
  - Estonian also has a rare "overlong" vowel length but does not distinguish it from the normal long vowel in writing, as they are distinguishable by context; see the example below.
- Consonant doubling after short vowels is very common in Swedish and other Germanic languages, including English. The system is somewhat inconsistent, especially in loanwords, around consonant clusters and with word-final nasal consonants. Examples:

Consistent use: byta /²byːta/ 'to change' vs bytta /²bʏtːa/ 'tub' and koma /²koːma/ 'coma' vs komma /²kɔma/ 'to come'
Inconsistent use: fält /ˈfɛlt/ 'a field' and kam /ˈkamː/ 'a comb' (but the verb 'to comb' is kamma)

- Classical Milanese orthography uses consonant doubling in closed short syllables, e.g., lenguagg 'language' and pubblegh 'public'.
- ie is used to mark the long /iː/ sound in German because of the preservation and the generalization of a historic ie spelling, which originally represented the sound /iə̯/. In Low German, a following e letter lengthens other vowels as well, e.g., in the name Kues /kuːs/.
- A following h is frequently used in German and older Swedish spelling, e.g., German Zahn [tsaːn] 'tooth'.

==== Other signs ====
- Colon, ⟨꞉⟩, from Americanist phonetic notation, and used in orthographies based on it such as Oʼodham, Mohawk or Seneca. The triangular colon ⟨ː⟩ in the International Phonetic Alphabet derives from this.
- Middot or half-colon, ⟨·⟩, a more common variant in the Americanist tradition, also used in language orthographies.
- Saltillo (straight apostrophe), used in Miꞌkmaq, as evidenced by the name itself. This is the convention of the Listuguj orthography (Miꞌgmaq), and a common substitution for the acute accent (Míkmaq) of the Francis-Smith orthography.

==== No distinction ====
Some languages make no distinction in writing. This is particularly the case with ancient languages such as Old English. Modern edited texts often use macrons with long vowels, however. Australian English does not distinguish the vowels /æ/ from /æː/ in spelling, with words like 'span' or 'can' having different pronunciations depending on meaning. Other modern languages that do not represent vowel length in their standard orthography include Serbo-Croatian, Slovene and Hausa.

=== Other writing systems ===
In non-Latin writing systems, a variety of mechanisms have also evolved.

- In abjads derived from the Aramaic alphabet, notably Arabic and Hebrew, long vowels are written with consonant letters (mostly approximant consonant letters) in a process called mater lectionis e.g. in Modern Arabic the long vowel /aː/ is represented by the letter ا (Alif), the vowels /uː/ and /oː/ are represented by و (wāw), and the vowels /iː/ and /eː/ are represented by ي (yāʼ), while short vowels are typically omitted entirely. Most of these scripts also have optional diacritics that can be used to mark short vowels when needed.
- In South-Asian abugidas, such as Devanagari or the Thai alphabet, there are different vowel signs for short and long vowels.
- Ancient Greek also had distinct vowel signs, but only for some long vowels; the vowel letters η (eta) and ω (omega) originally represented long forms of the vowels represented by the letters ε (epsilon, literally "bare e") and ο (omicron – literally "small o", by contrast with omega or "large o"). The other vowel letters of Ancient Greek, α (alpha), ι (iota) and υ (upsilon), could represent either short or long vowel phones.
- Japanese phonology:
  - In the hiragana syllabary, long vowels are usually indicated by adding a vowel character after. For vowels /aː/, /iː/, and /uː/, the corresponding independent vowel is added. Thus: あ (a), おかあさん, "okaasan", mother; い (i), にいがた "Niigata", city in northern Japan (usually 新潟, in kanji); う (u), りゅう "ryuu" (usu. 竜), dragon. The mid-vowels /eː/ and /oː/ may be written with え (e) (rare) (ねえさん (姉さん), neesan, "elder sister") and お (o) [おおきい (usu 大きい), ookii, big], or with い (i) (めいれい (命令), "meirei", command/order) and う (u) (おうさま (王様), ousama, "king") depending on etymological, morphological, and historic grounds.
  - Most long vowels in the katakana syllabary are written with a special bar symbol ー (vertical in vertical writing), called a chōon, as in メーカー mēkā "maker" instead of メカ meka "mecha". However, some long vowels are written with additional vowel characters, as with hiragana, with the distinction being orthographically significant.
  - Some analyses make a distinction between a long vowel and a succession of two identical vowels, citing pairs such as 砂糖屋 satōya 'sugar shop' [satoːja] vs. 里親, satooya, 'foster parent' [satooja]. They are usually identical in normal speech, but when enunciated a distinction may be made with a pause or a glottal stop inserted between two identical vowels.
  - In transcription: tsuki /tuki/ 'moon' vs. tsūki /tuuki/ 'airflow'.
- In the Korean Hangul alphabet, vowel length is not distinguished in normal writing. Some dictionaries use a double dot, ⟨:⟩, for example 무: "Daikon radish".
- In the Classic Maya script, also based on syllabic characters, long vowels in monosyllabic roots were generally written with word-final syllabic signs ending in the vowel -i rather than an echo-vowel. Hence, chaach "basket", with a long vowel, was written as cha-chi (compare chan "sky", with a short vowel, written as cha-na). If the nucleus of the syllable was itself i, however, the word-final vowel for indicating length was -a: tziik- "to count; to honour, to sanctify" was written as tzi-ka (compare sitz' "appetite", written as si-tz'i).

== See also ==
- Gemination
- Length (phonetics)
- Mora (linguistics)
