= Mixe people =

Mixe (Mije)
Ayüükjä'äy

- The Sierra Mixe within Oaxaca, Mexico

Total population
- ~90,000

Regions with significant populations
- Mexico (Oaxaca), El Salvador (Ahuachapan)

Languages
- Mixe, Spanish

Religion
- Roman Catholic, and Indigenous religion

Related ethnic groups
- Zoques

- People: Ayuujkjä'äy (Mixe)
- Language: Ayöök (Mixe)

The Mixe (Spanish mixe or rarely mije [ˈmixe]) are an Indigenous people of Mexico who live in the eastern highlands of the state of Oaxaca. They speak the Mixe languages, which are classified in the Mixe–Zoque family, and are more culturally conservative than other Indigenous groups of the region, maintaining their language to this day. SIL international estimated that the Mixe language was spoken by 90,000 people in 1993.

The Mixe name for themselves is Ayuujkjä'äy meaning "people who speak the mountain language". The word "Mixe" itself is probably derived from the Nahuatl word for cloud: mīxtli.

== Geography ==
The Mixe live in the Sierra Mixe, which is northeast of the city of Oaxaca. The region borders the Valley of Oaxaca to the southwest, the lowlands of Tehuantepec to the east, and the highlands of Choapam and the state of Veracruz to the north. This rugged and remote area is part the Sierra Madre de Oaxaca. The western Mixe live in a mountainous temperate highland zone with the largest Mixe centers in San Pedro and Pablo Ayutla (in Mixe called Tu'ukyom), Tlahuitoltepec (Xemgɨxp) and Totontepec (Añkɨwam).

At elevations above 2,400 meters, Mixe farmers cultivate maize, beans, potatoes, and squash. The midland Mixe are centered on Zacatepec (Mɨɨygɨxy) and Juquila (Kɨngɨ'ɨm). In this region, they grow coffee and chili peppers. The eastern Mixe live near the city Matías Romero in the tropical lowlands of the Isthmus of Tehuantepec. Here, at elevations from 35 to 1.000 meters, they grow tropical crops such as bananas, plantains, and sugar cane.

The Mixe region borders on regions inhabited by Zapotecs and Chinantecs, with whom the Mixe have some contact. The Mixe region is watered by three large rivers the Papaloapan, the Coatzacoalcos and the Tehuantepec. Three peaks in the Sierra Mixe reach heights above 3300 meters: at Cempoaltepetl (in Mixe Ipxyukp "the Mountain of twenty heads"), Cerro Blanco and Cerro Malinche.

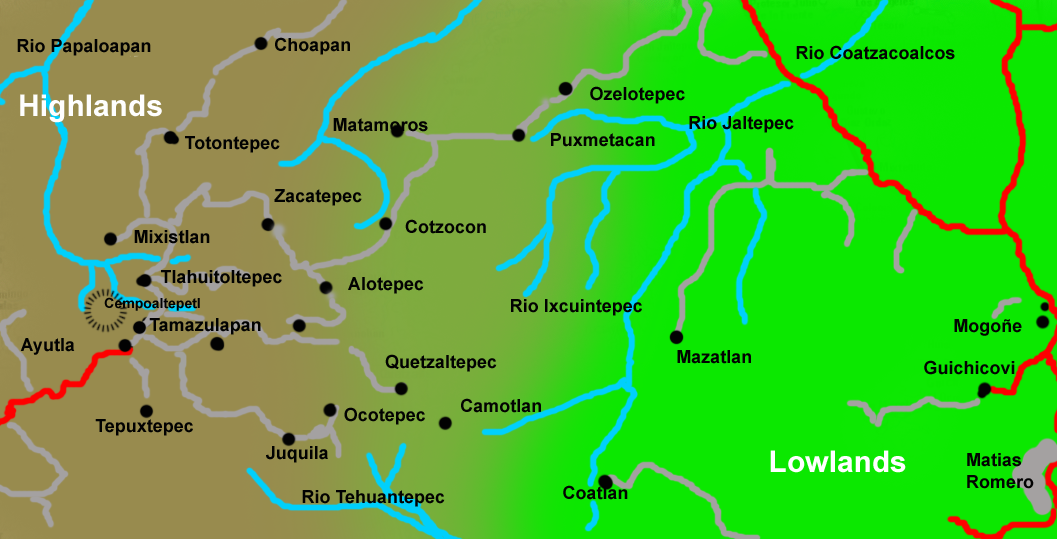
The major towns of the Mixe Region.

== History ==
Linguistic evidence suggests connection with the Olmecs, however there have also been some theories that associate the Mixe with the native cultures of the South American Andes. In the Mixe migration oral history they came to settle at the holy mountain Cempoaltepetl—where led by the legendary king Condoy (also known as Ëy Konk, or Ko’ong Oy) they built a successful kingdom. Almost nothing is known about the Mixes in prehispanic times as there are very few archeological remains in the Mixe area and written sources are equally scarce. It is known that neither the Zapotec kingdom of Zaachila nor the Aztec empire succeeded in subduing the Mixes completely.

After the Spanish conquest of central Mexico and the valley of Oaxaca a Spanish force under the command of Diego Sandoval was sent north to the Sierra Mixe to subdue the Mixes and Chinantecs of that region. The expedition failed and the Mixes remained unconquered. Hernán Cortés even mentions in his letters to the King of Spain that the provinces of the Zapotecs and the Mixes were the only ones to remain unconquered.

"In the whole territory, from one sea to the other, the natives serve without complaint, save for two provinces which lie between those of Teguantepeque, Chinanta, Guaxaca and Guazacualco, in the middle of all four; the people of these two provinces are called Zapotecas and Mixes. Their land is so rocky that it cannot be crossed even on foot, for I have twice sent people to conquer them, who were unable to do so because of the roughness of the terrain, and because the warriors are very fierce and well armed" Hernán Cortés, Fourth Letter to King Charles V

In 1555 the first peaceful contact between Spaniards and Mixes were undertaken when the Dominican order began the spiritual conquest of the Mixes. They built churches and missions in Juquila, Totontepec and Quetzaltepec. The Mixes still pride themselves of never having been conquered.

== Culture ==
The Mixe largely live from subsistence agriculture of corn, beans, squash, and potatoes, complemented by hunting small game and fishing on the smaller rivers and streams. However, in the past century, the midland Mixe have begun to commercialize coffee, usually as small producers who sell their roasted beans to buyers from outside the Mixe area. The Mixe are well known in Oaxaca for their large brass bands. Every Mixe town has a band that performs in their local festivals. In some towns traditional weaving is practiced on backstrap looms whereas other towns mainly produce ceramics.

=== Language ===
The Mixe language is a language of the Mixean branch of the Mixe–Zoque language family. Its closest relatives are Sayula Popoluca and Oluta Popoluca spoken in Veracruz. The language is polysynthetic, ergative and employs a direct–inverse system for participant reference. It can be subdivided into three dialect areas: Highland Mixe (northern Highland spoken around Totontepec and Southern Highland spoken around Tlahuitoltepec, Ayutla, and Tamazulapan), Midland Mixe (spoken around Juquila and Zacatepec) and Lowland Mixe (spoken around Guichicovi). The Mixe languages are poorly documented and many variants are not documented at all. Best documented are the dialects of Totontepec, Ayutla and Coatlán for which dictionaries and small grammars have been published by SIL international.

=== Social structure ===
Besides the nuclear family, an important part of Mixe social structure is the cargo system which is an integrated part of Mixe society. In the cargo system a number of civic and religious offices called "cargos" rotate among the men of each village. Cargoholders assume responsibilities of public interest such as arranging and paying for certain religious celebrations, caring for religious images, or upholding. A cargo is unpaid and held for a year; some cargoes include rather large financial obligations to the cargoholder. Persons who have held many cargoes are respected and the few persons who have held all possible cargoes in the community are part of a council of elders. With the conversion of many Mixes to different Protestant branches the functionality of the cargo system has been challenged in many towns resulting in social tension.

=== Religion ===
Ritual practices include prayers and sacrifice to a non-human entity called ‘The One Who Makes Being Alive (yë’ yïkjujykypyëjkp),’ which gives vitality. Rituals are also performed to entities such as the Rain, the Wind, and the Earth. Ritualistic ceremonies of the Mixe people involved primarily female shamans practicing diverse rituals involving but not limited to 'protection, divination, childbirth, travel, and hunting,' reflecting their connection to and evolution from ceremonial traditions of their Mesoamerican ancestors, the Olmec people. In Life as a Making, Perig Pitrou asserts that humans use technological activities to understand vital processes such as growth, reproduction, aging, and death. For example, the building of the earth in the Mixe origin story is a sequential process similar to that of pottery making. Mixe newborns are given ritual baths to make them strong and hard, similar to the hardening of pottery in a kiln. Human life is seen as being built and shaped by the Creator.

The creation myth of the Mixe people involves how ‘The One Whose Activity is to Have Ideas’ (täätyunpï) molds and shapes the world's beings. In this myth, the world created by ‘The One Whose Activity is to Have Ideas’ is likened to basket weaving or pottery, and the being's creations are described as inanimate objects, with ‘The One Who Makes Being Alive (yë’ yïkjujykypyëjkp)’ being the one who then breathes life into these objects created by ‘The One Whose Activity is to Have Ideas.’ In this way, much like a potter baking a piece of clay, there are two parts to creation and this is evident in their customs, such as birth rituals or rituals for rain to “breathe life into” the earth.

In addition to and in modification of the Catholic system, the Mixe maintain a pantheon of gods representing certain aspects. These include:

- Poj 'Enee ("Thunder wind"), a fertility and rain god who is also the protector of Mixe towns
- Naaxwiiñ ("Earth Surface"), an earth and fertility goddess
- Yuuk, the "owner of the animals" and the deity of wild animals and the hunt
- Hɨgɨñ, a goddess of rivers and springs, venerated by fishermen
- Mɨjku, a god of wealth, luck, hurricanes, death and the underworld, who is often equated with the Catholic devil.

The Mixe are among the few contemporary Indigenous communities of Mesoamerica to still use the 260-day ritual calendar which was in use throughout Mesoamerica in pre-Columbian times. The Mixe use the ritual calendar for divination, planning of rituals and in order to determine the names given to children. Mixes have two names: a calendrical name in the Mixe language given at birth and a Spanish-Catholic name given at baptism.

Nagualism also forms a part of Mixe religious beliefs: the Mixe believe that every person is born simultaneously with an animal which becomes their Tso'ok (Nahual/animal counterpart) – the animal carries part of the human's soul and the two beings will share a common destiny.

== Notable people ==
- Agustín Cruz Tinoco, artisan
- Sandra Domínguez (1987–2024), human rights activist
- Irma Galindo (born 1982), human rights activist
