= Totontepec Villa de Morelos =

Totontepec Villa de Morelos Anyukojm (Totontepec Mixe)
- Municipality and town
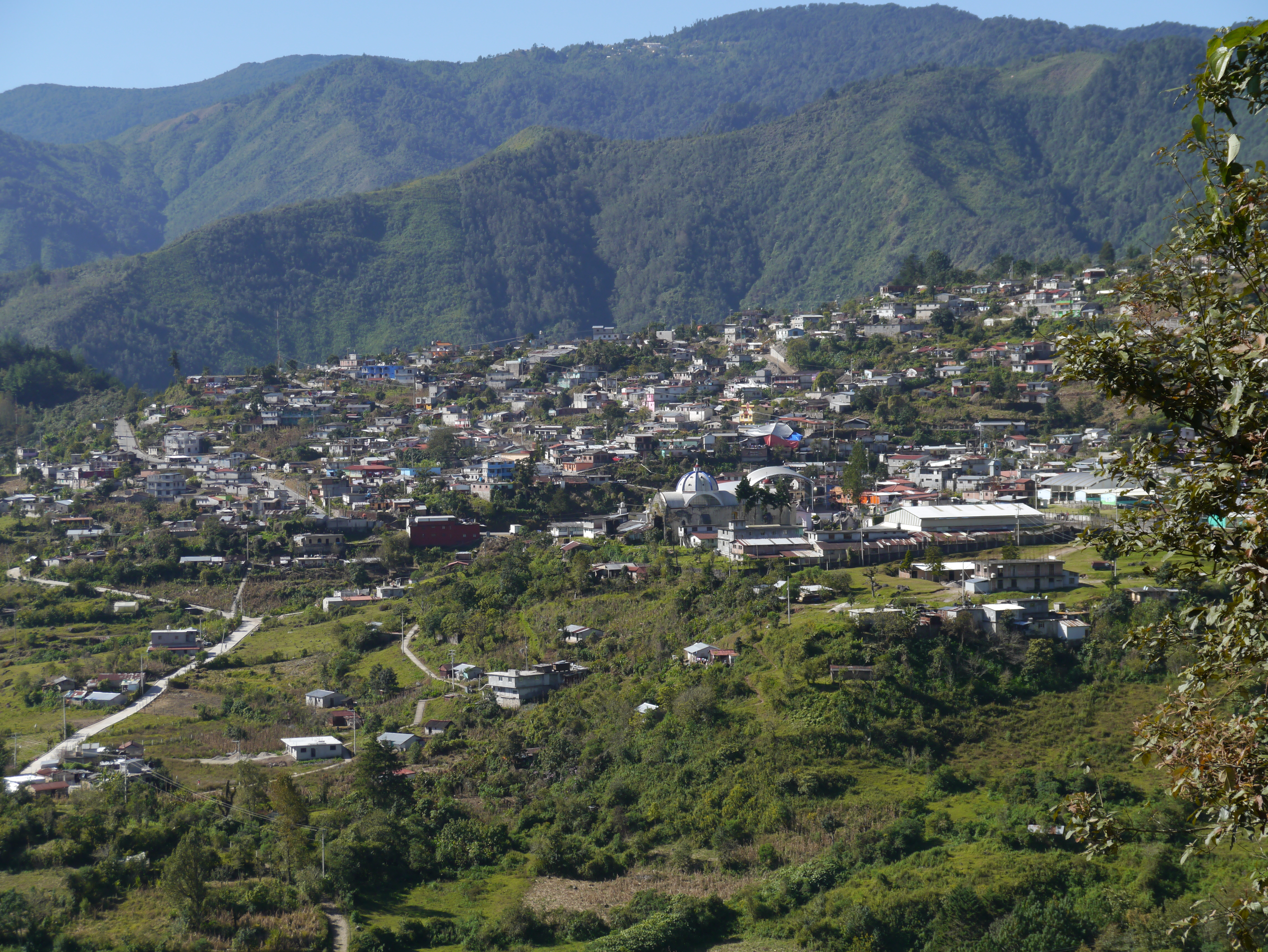

- Location in Mexico
- Coordinates: 17°13′N 95°59′W
- Country: Mexico
- State: Oaxaca

Area
  - Total: 318.95 km^{2} (123.15 sq mi)

Population (2010)
  - Total: 5,598
- Time zone: UTC-6 (Central Standard Time)

Totontepec Villa de Morelos (Totontepec Mixe: Anyukojm) is a town and municipality, in the Sierra Mixe district of the Mexican state of Oaxaca. It is located 1,840 meters above sea level and 146 kilometers from the state capital, Oaxaca de Juárez. The toponym "Totontepec" is of Nahuatl origin, meaning "hot hill". In the local dialect of Mixe the town is called Anyukojm, meaning "place of thunder."

== The town ==
The locals, called Totontepecanos, speak Mexican Spanish and the local dialect of the Mixe language. Each dialect of Mixe is different depending on the community in which it is spoken. According to the 2010 census, the town had a population of 1,801 people.

The town's most notable feature is a rock that can be seen from nearly every location. In Spanish it's called "La Mitra" or "La Peña del Trueno," and in Mixe "Anyukääts." It is located at the top of the mountain on which Totontepec is built. The locals will scale this mountain to light prayer candles and get a great view of their town.

Totontepec is home to an unusual landrace of maize, locally known as "olotón", but more commonly described in the English-speaking world as "Sierra Mixe". This corn grows aerial roots secreting sugary mucus to feed nitrogen-fixing bacteria, fertilizing itself to thrive in the poor local soil in exchange.

== The municipality ==
According to the 2010 Census, the municipality had a total population of 5,598, with 98.3% of the inhabitants older than five years of age speaking an indigenous language. The municipality covers 318.95 km^{2}.

As municipal seat, Totontepec has governing jurisdiction over the following communities:

San José Chinantequilla, El Duraznal, Patio Grande, Rancho Alejandro Villegas, San Francisco Jayacaxtepec, San Marcos Moctum, San Miguel Metepec, Santa María Huitepec, Santa María Ocotepec, Santa María Tiltepec, Santiago Amatepec, Santiago Jareta, Santiago Tepitongo, and Tierra Caliente (Rancho Uno y Rancho Dos)
