= Checked and free vowels =

Concept in phonology, especially of English

In phonetics and phonology, checked vowels are those that commonly stand only in stressed closed syllables, while free vowels are those that can stand in either a stressed closed syllable or a stressed open syllable.

== Terminology ==
The terms checked vowel and free vowel originated in English phonetics and phonology; they are seldom used for the description of other languages, even though a distinction between vowels that usually have to be followed by a consonant and other vowels is common in most Germanic languages.

=== Tenseness ===
The terms checked vowel and free vowel correspond closely to the terms lax vowel and tense vowel, respectively, but linguists often prefer to use the terms checked and free, as there is no clear-cut phonetic definition of vowel tenseness, and, because by most given definitions of tenseness, /ɔː/ and /ɑː/ are considered lax—even though they behave in American and British English as free vowels (see § Examples in English).

=== Spelling ===
The terms are also useful in the description of English spelling. The free written vowels ⟨a, e, i, o, u⟩ correspond to the spoken vowels /eɪ/, /iː/, /aɪ/, /oʊ/, /uː/; while checked ⟨a, e, i, o, u⟩ correspond to /æ/, /ɛ/, /ɪ/, /ɒ/, /ʊ/. In spelling, free and checked vowels are often referred to as long and short, respectively, based on their historical pronunciation and perceived length; however, nowadays some or all of the free vowels are diphthongs, depending on the dialect, not necessarily pure long vowels in the phonetic sense (i.e. lengthened monophthongs).

Written consonant doubling often shows the vowel is checked: the ⟨i⟩ of dinner corresponds to checked /ɪ/, as indicated by the doubled consonants ⟨nn⟩, whereas the ⟨i⟩ of diner corresponds to free /aɪ/, as indicated by the single consonant ⟨n⟩. However, there are some exceptions to this rule due to the differences in doubling rules between American and British styles of spelling, primarily for words ending with ⟨l⟩ modified by a suffix (e.g. traveling, canceled vs. travelling, cancelled). Similarly, an ⟨e⟩ following a single consonant at the end of a word (commonly referred to as a silent e) often indicates that the preceding vowel is free where it would otherwise be checked; for example, the ⟨a⟩ of tap corresponding to /æ/, whereas the ⟨a⟩ in tape corresponds to /eɪ/.

=== Other uses ===
The term checked vowels has been used to refer to the kind of very short glottalized vowels heard in the Zapotecan languages of Oaxaca, Mexico, which contrast with laryngealized vowels. Similarly, the term has also been used to refer to a short vowel followed by a glottal stop in the Mixe languages, which have a distinction between two kinds of glottalized syllable nuclei: checked ones, with the glottal stop after a short vowel for one type, and nuclei with rearticulated vowels, a long vowel with a glottal stop in the middle for the other type.

== In English ==
=== Checked vowels ===
The checked vowels in English are the following:

- KIT /ɪ/ as in pit
- DRESS /ɛ/ as in pet
- TRAP /æ/ as in pat
- LOT /ɒ/ as in pot (in varieties without the cot–caught merger or the father–bother merger)
- FOOT /ʊ/ as in put (in varieties without the foot–goose merger)
- STRUT /ʌ/ as in putt

There are a few exceptions, mostly in interjections: eh and meh with /ɛ/; duh, huh, uh, uh-uh, and uh-huh with /ʌ/; nah with /æ/ or /ɒ/; and yeah with /ɛ/ (in accents that lack the diphthong /ɛə/) or /æ/. There are also the onomatopoeia baa for /æ/ and the loanword pho for /ʌ/ when pronounced in American English, as well as sometimes milieu and pot-au-feu.

=== Free vowels ===
The free vowels in English are the following:

- FLEECE /iː/ as in pea
- FACE /eɪ/ as in pay
- GOOSE /uː/ as in Pooh
- GOAT /oʊ/ as in Poe
- THOUGHT /ɔː/ as in paw
- PALM /ɑː/ as in Pa
- PRICE /aɪ/ as in pie
- MOUTH /aʊ/ as in plow
- CHOICE /ɔɪ/ as in ploy

=== Ambiguous vowels ===
The schwa (commA) /ə/ is usually considered neither free nor checked in English because it typically cannot stand in stressed syllables, but this is complicated by non-rhotic accents. In non-rhotic accents, non-prevocalic instances of /ɜːr/ as in nURse and /ər/ as in lettER are realized as pure vowels, with the former often being considered the stressed counterpart of the latter and little to no difference in quality (other than possibly length): [ˈnə(ː)s] vs. [ˈlɛ.tə]. In rhotic accents, they often surface as rhotacized vowels, and likewise often lack a phonetic distinction, differing only in stress: [ˈnɚs] vs. [ˈlɛ.tɚ] (or in other analyses, syllabic rhotic approximants: [ˈnɹ̩s] vs. [ˈlɛ.tɹ̩]). Thus, from a phonological standpoint /ɜːr/ is free while /ər/ is neither (as it cannot be stressed, like /ə/); but from a phonetic standpoint, as they are often the same vowel separated only by stress, they are both free.

== See also ==
- List of phonetics topics
- Checked tone of Chinese
