= Nicoleño language =

Extinct Uto-Aztecan language

Nicoleño
- Island Takic
- Native to: United States
- Region: San Nicolas Island, California
- Ethnicity: Nicoleño
- Extinct: October 19, 1853, with the death of Juana Maria
- Language family: Uto-Aztecan: Northern; Takic; Cupan?/Serran?; Nicoleño

Language codes
- ISO 639-3: None (mis)
- Glottolog: isla1277

The Nicoleño language is an extinct language formerly spoken on San Nicolas Island by the Nicoleño. It went extinct with Juana Maria's death in 1853. Its extant remnants consist only of four words and two songs attributed to her. Contemporary accounts are clear that no one could be found who could understand Juana Maria.

== Classification ==
Based on this limited evidence, Alfred L. Kroeber in 1907 identified Nicoleño as a "Shoshonean language" – and classified it with the Takic branch of Uto-Aztecan that includes Tongva (Gabrieliño), spoken on Santa Catalina Island and the adjacent coast, and Luiseño, spoken to the south. Most subsequent linguists have followed Kroeber's conclusions.

In 2000, linguist Pamela Munro argued that Nicoleño was part of the Cupan group of Takic languages, and not closely related to Tongva. According to Munro's analysis, Nicoleño had similarities to both the Luiseño–Juaneño and the Cupeño–Cahuilla branches of Cupan, and possibly represented a third distinct branch.

== Vocabulary ==
The four Nicoleño words that were translated were tocah, meaning "animal hide"; nache, meaning "man"; toygwah, meaning "sky"; and puoochay, meaning "body".

== See also ==
- List of extinct Uto-Aztecan languages
