= Kitanemuk =

Indigenous Californian people

Total population
- 50 (2000)

Regions with significant populations
- United States (California)

Languages
- English, formerly Kitanemuk

Religion
- Animism

Related ethnic groups
- Serrano, Tongva, Tataviam, and Vanyume

The Kitanemuk are an Indigenous people of California who historically lived in the Tehachapi Mountains and the Antelope Valley area of the western Mojave Desert of Southern California, United States. The Kitanemuk lived in what is now Kern County, California. Today, some of the Kitanemuk are enrolled in the federally recognized Tejon Indian Tribe of California.

== Language ==
The Kitanemuk historically spoke the Kitanemuk language, a Uto-Aztecan language, probably akin to that of the Takic branch and to the Serrano language in particular, as well as the Tongva and Vanyume languages. Alice Anderton reconstructed the dead language in 1988 from Harrington's notes.

== Culture ==
Nuts and seeds constituted a significant component of the Kitanemuk diet. The tribe relied on acorns, which were harvested in the autumn, to sustain their meals throughout the year. Additionally, piñon nuts were collected and preserved. Seeds from various plants, including chia and wild oats, were obtained by striking the grasses with a seedbeater, a specialized basket crafted from tule reeds. These seeds were then ground into a type of flour. This flour was subsequently combined with water to form small cakes, which were baked in an earth oven. Numerous plants had roots that contributed to the tribe's food resources. Tule roots were dried and crushed into flour for preparing mush. The roots of the brodiaea, or wild hyacinth, were roasted in hot coals and consumed similarly to potatoes. The Kitanemuk also ate the fresh leaves and stems of other plants, such as clover and ferns.

== Population ==
Estimates for the precontact populations of most native groups in California have varied substantially. Alfred L. Kroeber (1925:883) proposed a population of 1,770 for the Kitanemuk, together with the Serrano and Tataviam, as 3,500. Thomas C. Blackburn and Lowell John Bean (1978:564) estimated the Kitanemuk alone as 500 to 1,000.

The combined population of the Kitanemuk, Serrano, and Tataviam in 1910 had fallen to only 150 persons, according to Kroeber.

== History ==
Before European settlement, the Kitanemuk lived in the area that is now Palmdale, California. They were hunters and gatherers who relied mostly on the land’s natural resources. They did not farm or raise animals, but they traded with the Chumash of Santa Barbara and traveled through the foothills of the Antelope Valley near Palmdale.

=== 18th century ===
The Kitanemuk lived in semi-permanent villages. They harvested acorns and vegetables and hunted small game.

The Kitanemuk were first contacted by the Franciscan missionary-explorer Francisco Garcés in 1769. Some Kitanemuk were recruited and relocated for the Spanish missions of Mission San Fernando Rey de España in the San Fernando Valley, Mission San Gabriel Arcángel in the San Gabriel Valley, and perhaps Mission San Buenaventura at the coast in Ventura County. Therefore, they are sometimes grouped with the Mission Indians.

=== 19th century ===
In 1840, a smallpox epidemic hit the Kitanemuk. Beginning in the 1850s, they were associated with the reservations at Fort Tejon and Tule River.

The Kitanemuk moved to the Tejon Ranch Indian community, which never received a reservation.

=== 20th century ===
By 1917, some lived on Tejon Ranch and others lived on the Tule River Reservation, located in Tulare County, California.

=== 21st century ===
One Kitanemuk family still lives on the Tejon Ranch, while others live nearby. Others still live on the Tule River Reservation.

== See also ==
- Kitanemuk traditional narratives
