= Morongo Band of Mission Indians =

Native American tribe in Southern California

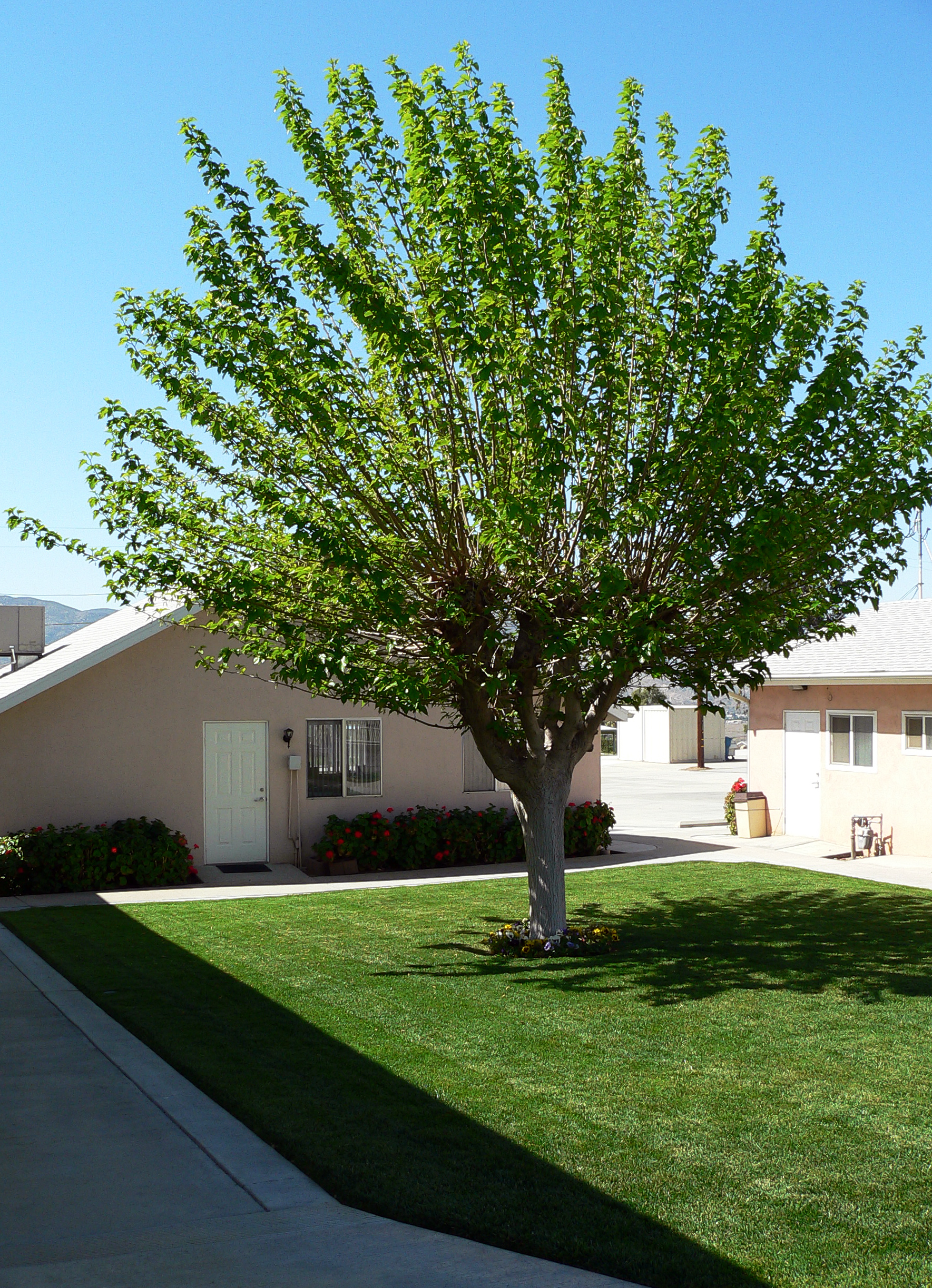
- Moravian Church on the Morongo Reservation

Total population
- 996

Regions with significant populations
- United States (California)

Languages
- English, Pass Cahuilla, and Serrano.

Religion
- traditional tribal religion, Christianity (Roman Catholicism)

Related ethnic groups
- other Cahuilla and Serrano people, as well as Chemehuevi, Cupeño, and Luiseño people

The Morongo Band of Mission Indians is a federally recognized tribe in California, United States. They are mainly Cahuilla and Serrano; however, some tribal citizens are also Chemehuevi, Cupeño, and Luiseño Indians. Although many tribes in California are known as Mission Indians, some, such as those at Morongo, were never a part of the Spanish Missions in California.

The Morongo Reservation is located in Riverside County, California, in the San Gorgonio Pass. Established as the Portrero Reservation by executive order in 1876 under President Ulysses S. Grant, and called Malki by the Native Americans, the Morongo name was adopted by 1908 when the land was patented to the Morongo Band of Mission Indians. The tribe has developed a large casino and hotel resort at Cabazon to support tribal programs and economic development.

== Name ==
The name Morongo is derived from the Serrano clan, Maarrenga.

The main Indigenous people of the San Gorgonio Pass are Pass Cahuilla, who call the area Maalki. The Serrano, who had historically intermarried with the Pass Cahuilla, and who have lived in the area since well before the inception of the reservation, call the area Maarrkinga'.

== Reservation ==
Location of Morongo Reservation

The Morongo Reservation (33°57′10″N 116°48′28″W) is located at the base of the San Gorgonio and San Jacinto Mountains. It is more than 35,000 acres (14,000 ha) in size. On May 15, 1876, President Ulysses S. Grant established this and eight other reservations in the area by executive order. Approximately 954 of the 996 enrolled tribal members live on the reservation.

The first official "Captain" of Potrero Ajenio (aka San Gorgonio Agency), recognized by the Bureau of Indian Affairs, was the hereditary leader of the Maarrenga, known to Americans by his English name, John Morongo. As time went on, the Bureau began to refer to the tribe as the Morongo Band of Mission Indians.

== Government ==
The Morongo Band of Mission Indians is headquartered in Banning, California. They are governed by a democratically elected tribal council. Their current administration is as follows:

- Charles Martin, Chairman
- James Siva, Vice Chairman
- Mary Ann Andreas, Councilmember
- Jeanette Burns, Councilmember
- Teresa Sanchez, Councilmember
- Brian Lugo, Councilmember
- Theresa Mathews, Councilmember

== Education ==
The tribe runs its own education services, including independent college preparatory high schools and pre-K through 8th grade schools. The reservation is planning to add a high school, and Native Americans not living directly on the reservation are zoned to the Banning Unified School District.

== Languages ==
Cahuilla and Serrano are Takic languages, part of the Uto-Aztecan language family. The Cahuilla and Serrano languages are technically considered to be extinct as they are no longer spoken at home, and children are no longer learning them as primary languages. Joe Saubel, a Morongo tribal citizen and the last fluent speaker of Pass Cahuilla, died in 2008. The last fluent speaker of Serrano was Ms. Dorothy Ramon, an enrolled Morongo citizen who died in 2002. Recent generations have found a renewed interest in their Native languages, however.

Many families are working to have their children educated to speak Pass Cahuilla and/or Serrano. In 2012, the Limu Project announced that it had successfully reconstructed Pass Cahuilla, and it is offering an online course. The project also offers online courses in Maarrenga' (Morongo Band "Serrano" dialect) and Yuhaviat (Santos Manuel Band "Serrano" dialect).

== Economic development ==
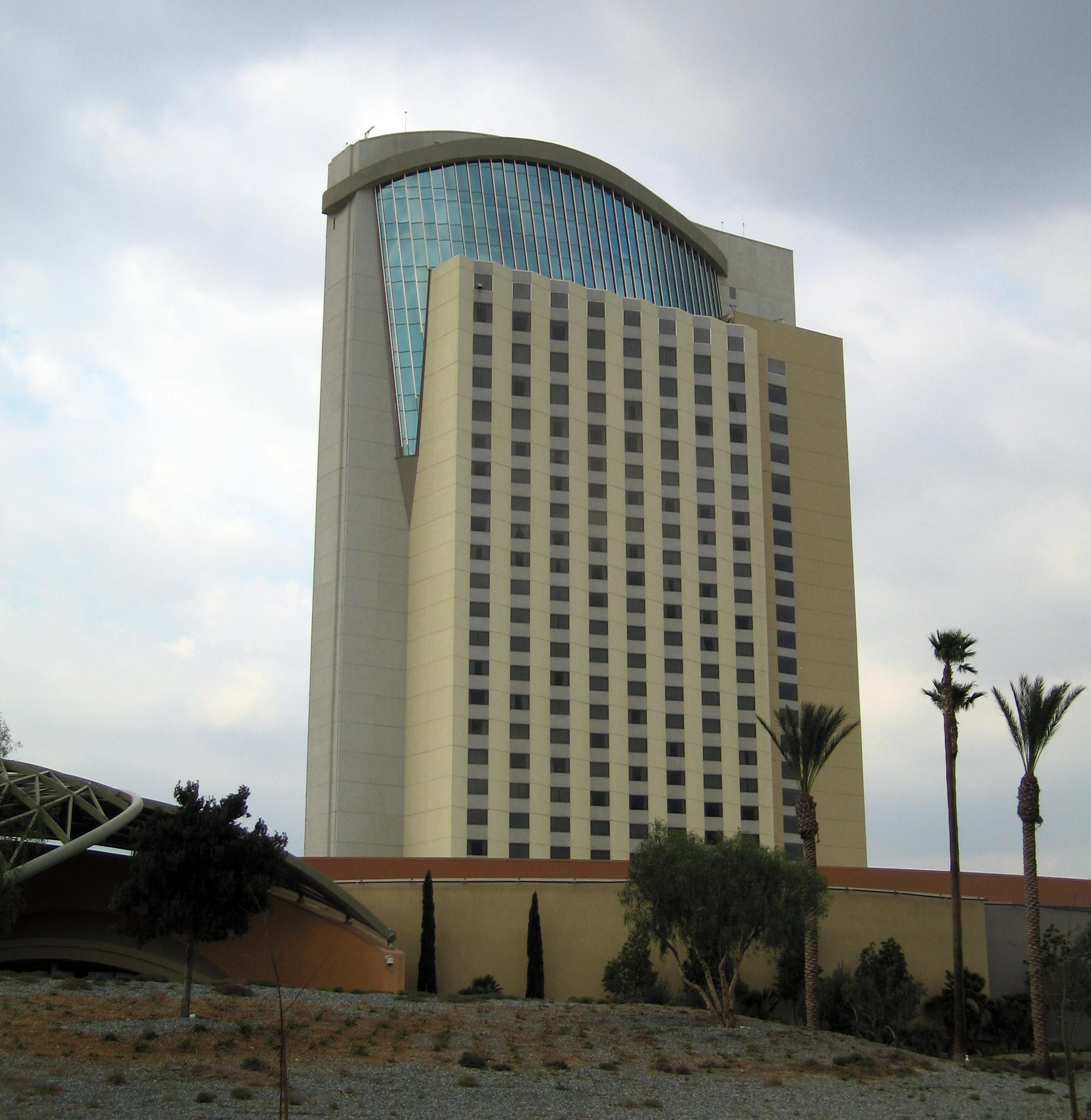
Morongo Casino, Riverside County, California

The tribe opened a small bingo hall in 1983, which became the foundation of what is now one of the oldest Native gaming enterprises in California. The government of Riverside County, California, attempted to shut down the bingo hall. The tribe joined with the Cabazon Band of Mission Indians in suing the local government, a case that eventually was decided by the U.S. Supreme Court. On February 25, 1987, the court upheld the right of sovereign Indian tribes to operate gaming enterprises on their reservations.

The Morongo Casino, Resort & Spa was opened in 2004 in Cabazon, California. It is open seven days a week, 24 hours a day. The hotel has 310 rooms. Several restaurants and bars are part of the complex: Desert Orchid: contemporary Asian cuisine, Potrero Canyon Buffet, Cielo: Pacific Coast Steak and Seafood Restaurant, Serrano, Sunset Bar and Grill, a food court, Mystique Lounge, and the Pit Bar. The club, 360, is open on weekends.

=== Water bottling ===
The tribe participated in development of a water bottling plant on the reservation. It is operated by Nestle Waters North America Inc., which leases the property from the tribe. The plant bottles Arrowhead spring water, as well as purified water sold under the brand Nestle Pure Life. In his 2010 book, Bottled and Sold: The Story Behind Our Obsession with Bottled Water, author Peter H. Gleick said the plant was producing more than 1 billion bottles of Arrowhead spring water per year.

=== Cultural programs ===
The Malki Museum on the Morongo Reservation is open to the public. It maintains the Malki Museum Press, which publishes the Journal of California and Great Basin Anthropology and scholarly books on Native American culture. The reservation is also home to the Limu Project, a tribal community-based nonprofit organization that helps families preserve knowledge of their indigenous languages, history, and cultural traditions.

== Churches ==
Two churches are on the Morongo Reservation. They are the Protestant Morongo Moravian Church and the Catholic St. Mary's Mission, maintained by the Saint Kateri Tekakwitha Catholic Community.

== Notable tribal citizens ==
- Marigold Linton (b. 1936), psychologist, educator, and author
