= Tataviam =

Native American group in Southern California, United States

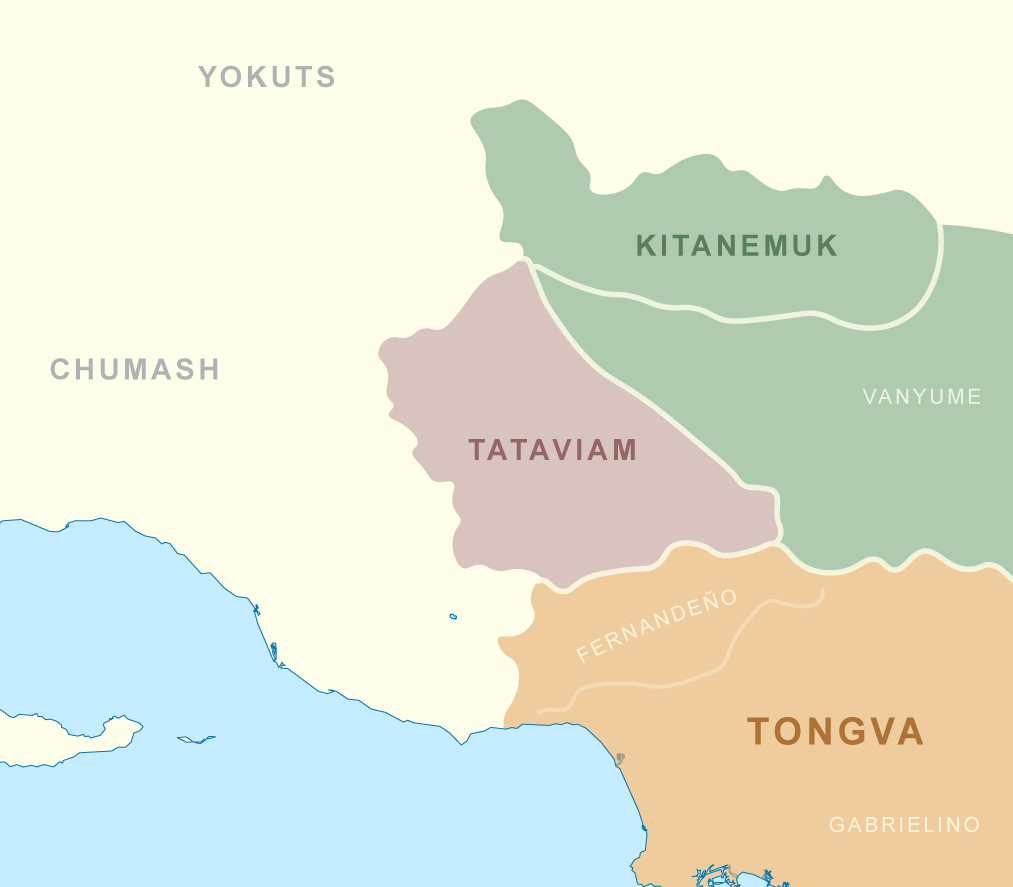
- The general area where the Tataviam language was spoken prior to European colonization (shown in red)

Regions with significant populations
- United States ( California)

Languages
- English, Spanish formerly Tataviam

Religion
- Traditional tribal religion, Christianity

Related ethnic groups
- Tongva, Chumash, Serrano, Kitanemuk, Luiseño, Vanyume

The Tataviam (Kitanemuk: people on the south slope) are a Native American group in Southern California. The ancestral land of the Tataviam people includes northwest present-day Los Angeles County and southern Ventura County, primarily in the upper basin of the Santa Clara River, the Santa Susana Mountains, and the Sierra Pelona Mountains. They are distinct from the Kitanemuk and the Gabrielino-Tongva peoples.

Their tribal government is based in San Fernando, California, and includes the Executive Branch, the Legislative Branch, the Tribal Senate, and the Council of Elders. The current Tribal President of the Fernandeño Tataviam Band of Mission Indians is Rudy Ortega Jr., who is a descendant of the village of Tochonanga.

The Tataviam are not federally recognized, which has prevented the tribe from being seen as sovereign and erased the identity of tribal members. The tribe has established an Acknowledge Rent campaign to acknowledge "the financial hardships placed on non-federally recognized tribes."

== History ==
=== Pre-European settlement ===
The Santa Clarita Valley is believed to be the center of Tataviam territory, north of the Los Angeles metropolitan area. In 1776, they were noted as a distinct linguistic and cultural group, by Padre Francisco Garcés, and have been distinguished from the Kitanemuk and the Fernandeño.

The Tataviam people had summer and winter settlements. They harvested Yucca whipplei and wa'at or juniper berries.

According to settler accounts, the Tataviam were called the Alliklik by their neighbors, the Chumash, meaning grunter or stammerer, probably because of the way their language sounded to Chumash ears.

=== Spanish colonization ===
The Spanish first encountered the Tataviam during their 1769-1770 expeditions. According to Chester King and Thomas C. Blackburn (1978:536), "By 1810, virtually all the Tataviam had been baptized at Mission San Fernando Rey de España." Like many other indigenous groups, they suffered high rates of fatalities from Old World infectious diseases brought by the Spanish, in particular small pox, or by their livestock (which brought influenza, anthrax, leptospirosis, and bovine tuberculosis), resulting in major population declines.

=== Mexican governance ===
The Fernandeño Tataviam Band of Mission Indians claims that when the First Mexican Republic passed the Mexican secularization act of 1833 and seized the California missions, that 50 Tataviam leaders where awarded vast land grants amounting to over 18,000 acres, or around 10% of the San Fernando Valley, including vast swaths of what is today northern Los Angeles County.

=== American governance ===
Fernandeño Tataviam Band of Mission Indians Fernandeños
- Unrecognized
- Seal
- Ethnicity: Tataviam
- Location: Los Angeles County, California, United States
- Population: 900+
- Surnames: Ortega, Garcia, Ortiz

When the United States annexed California following the Mexican American War, these land grants made by the Mexican government became void, and as such when the California Land Act of 1851 passed, and with the Tataviam rejecting American citizenship, their land entered public domain and was auctioned off by the state. Some Tataviam attempted to challenge this seizure in the Los Angeles Superior Court, however, the court found against the Tataviam, as the United States was under no obligation to respect Mexican land grants. By 1900 the Tataviam had lost all their land, and as such where ineligible to receive an Indian Reservation.

The United States Indian Affairs decided to group the Tataviam with other Indian Villages in the same region, which is now Fort Tejon Indian Reservation.

During the California Genocide from 1846 to 1873, California’s Native American population plunged from perhaps 150,000 to 30,000. Many contemporary Tataviam people trace their lineage back to the original Tataviam people through genealogical records.

Alfred L. Kroeber (1925:883) estimated the combined population of the Serrano, Kitanemuk, and Tataviam to be 3,500 people in 1770. By 1910, their population was recorded at 150.

The Fernandeño Tataviam Band of Mission Indians claims that there are over 900 Tataviam, all of which are from one of three families; Ortega, Garcia, and Ortiz.

On January 14, 2024, Land Veritas donated 500 acres of land between the Antelope Valley to the Pacific Ocean to the Tataviam Land Conservancy, a non-profit group founded by the Fernandeño Tataviam Band of Mission Indians. The uninhabited land consists of a few unpaved roads, and a concrete pad that the conservancy hopes to turn into an educational center.

== See also ==
- Chaguayanga
- Tataviam language
