= Serrano traditional narratives =

Serrano traditional narratives include myths, legends, tales, and oral histories preserved by the Serrano people of the San Bernardino Mountains and southern Mojave Desert of southern California, originally in the Serrano language.

Serrano oral literature is closely linked with the traditions of the Serrano's closest linguistic relatives, the Takic-speaking groups to their south, as well as with the traditions of the Yuman–speaking groups. These relationships are particularly evident in the sharing of the distinctive Southern California Creation Myth.

== Examples of Serrano Narratives ==
American anthropologist and folklorist Ruth Benedict published 17 myths narrated by Rosa Morongo in the Journal of American Folklore, including the Serrano creation myth.

== Sources for Serrano narratives ==
- Benedict, Ruth. 1926. "Serrano Tales". Journal of American Folklore 39:1-17. (17 myths narrated by Rosa Morongo.)
- Erdoes, Richard, and Alfonso Ortiz. 1984. American Indian Myths and Legends. Pantheon Books, New York. (Retelling of a narrative from Benedict 1926, pp. 438–439.)
- Gifford, Edward Winslow. 1918. "Clans and Moieties in Southern California". University of California Publications in American Archaeology and Ethnology 14:155-219. Berkeley. (Myths narrated by Benjamin Morongo in 1916–1917, pp. 182–186.)
- Gifford, Edward Winslow, and Gwendoline Harris Block. 1930. California Indian Nights. Arthur H. Clark, Glendale, California. (One previously published narrative, pp. 203–205.)
- Hill, Kenneth C. 1978. "Coyote and the Flood (Serrano)". In Coyote Stories, edited by William Bright, pp. 112–116. International Journal of American Linguistics Native American Texts Series No. 1. University of Chicago Press. (Narrated by Sarah Morongo Martin in 1963.)
- Hill, Kenneth C. 1980. "The Seven Sisters (Serrano)". In Coyote Stories II, edited by Martha B. Kendall, pp. 97–103. International Journal of American Linguistics Native American Texts Series No. 6. University of Chicago Press.
- Kroeber, A. L. 1925. Handbook of the Indians of California. Bureau of American Ethnology Bulletin No. 78. Washington, D.C. (Creation myth, p. 619.)
- Luthin, Herbert W. 2002. Surviving through the Days: A California Indian Reader. University of California Press, Berkeley. (A version of the creation myth collected in 1963 from Sarah Martin by Kenneth C. Hill, pp. 401–410.)
- Margolin, Malcolm. 1993. The Way We Lived: California Indian Stories, Songs, and Reminiscences. First edition 1981. Heyday Books, Berkeley, California. (Orpheus myth, pp. 82–83, from Benedict 1926.)
- Mount, Guy. 1993. Serrano Songs and Stories. Sweetlight Books, Cottonwood, California.

== See also ==
- Serrano language
