= Vanyume =

Native American people of California

Beñemé

Regions with significant populations
- United States (California)

Languages
- Vanyume language

Religion
- Indigenous religion

Related ethnic groups
- Serrano, Tataviam, Kitanemuk, Tongva

The Vanyume or Desert Serrano are an Indigenous people of Southern California. Historical Vanyume territory extended along the Mojave River from the Eastern Mojave Desert to present-day Victorville, and may have included portions of southern Antelope Valley. The major village of Wá’peat was part of this area.

Though the Vanyume were closely related to the neighboring Serrano people linguistically and culturally, the two groups were politically distinct before European contact. Because all documented Vanyume villages had been abandoned before modern ethnographic fieldwork emerged, ethnographic information on the Vanyume is limited.

== Name ==
The first European to mention the Vanyume, Father Francisco Garcés, referred to the group using the Mojave exonym Beñemé. Vanyumé, a variation of the term, was later adopted by ethnographer Alfred Louis Kroeber.

== Language ==
Vanyume
- Beñemé, Vanyumé, Desert Serrano
- Native to: United States
- Region: southern California
- Ethnicity: Vanyume
- Extinct: 20th century
- Language family: Uto-Aztecan: Northern; Takic ?; Serran; Serrano; Vanyume

Language codes
- ISO 639-3: –
- Glottolog: vany1234

The Vanyume historically spoke the Vanyume language, a now-extinct and poorly attested Uto-Aztecan language belonging to the Takic branch. The Vanyume language was likely very closely related to the Serrano language, though it may have shared features with the neighboring Kitanemuk language, and was spoken to the north of Serrano territory. It was documented by Alfred Kroeber in the early 20th century, who reported it to be a dialect of Serrano, part of a dialect continuum with Kitanemuk.

== Population ==
A. L. Kroeber described the Vanyume population as "very small" at the time of European contact. A 2017 analysis found that the group could have comprised as many as 700 people at the time of contact.

== Population decline ==
Between the late 18th and early 20th centuries, the Vanyume population dramatically declined.

=== Missionization ===
Beginning in 1790, a number of Vanyume people were baptized at Mission San Fernando and Mission San Gabriel. The period between 1811 and 1814 saw the most rapid missionization, a process likely aided through military intimidation. An 1811 effort may have attempted to forcefully round up and relocate the Vanyume and Serrano.

Compared to their upriver counterparts, Vanyume villages on the lower Mojave river enjoyed relative freedom from Spanish influence and missionization.

In late 1810s, several Vanyume settlements were depopulated and their residents killed by warring Spanish and Mojave people.

=== Other factors ===
Indigenous Californians interviewed by ethnographers in the late 19th and early 20th centuries describe incidents of trade-related violence with the Mojave as a key factor in the decline and dispersion of Vanyume populations. These conflicts likely occurred around the 1830s.

Some living people have Vanyume ancestry.
