= Tochonanga =

Historical Native American village in Newhall, Santa Clarita, California, U.S.

Tochonanga was a Tataviam village now located at the area of what is now Newhall, Santa Clarita, California, along the Santa Clara River.

People baptized from the village were largely moved to Mission San Fernando Rey de España and referred to in mission records as Tochonabit.

== Early history ==
Tochonanga was likely an important ceremonial center for the Tataviam based on the many chieftly names that came from the village. The terms Mu, Nu, and Nuguit were titles of village leaders. Tochonanga was located to the north of the large village of Pasheeknga.

== Spanish colonial period ==
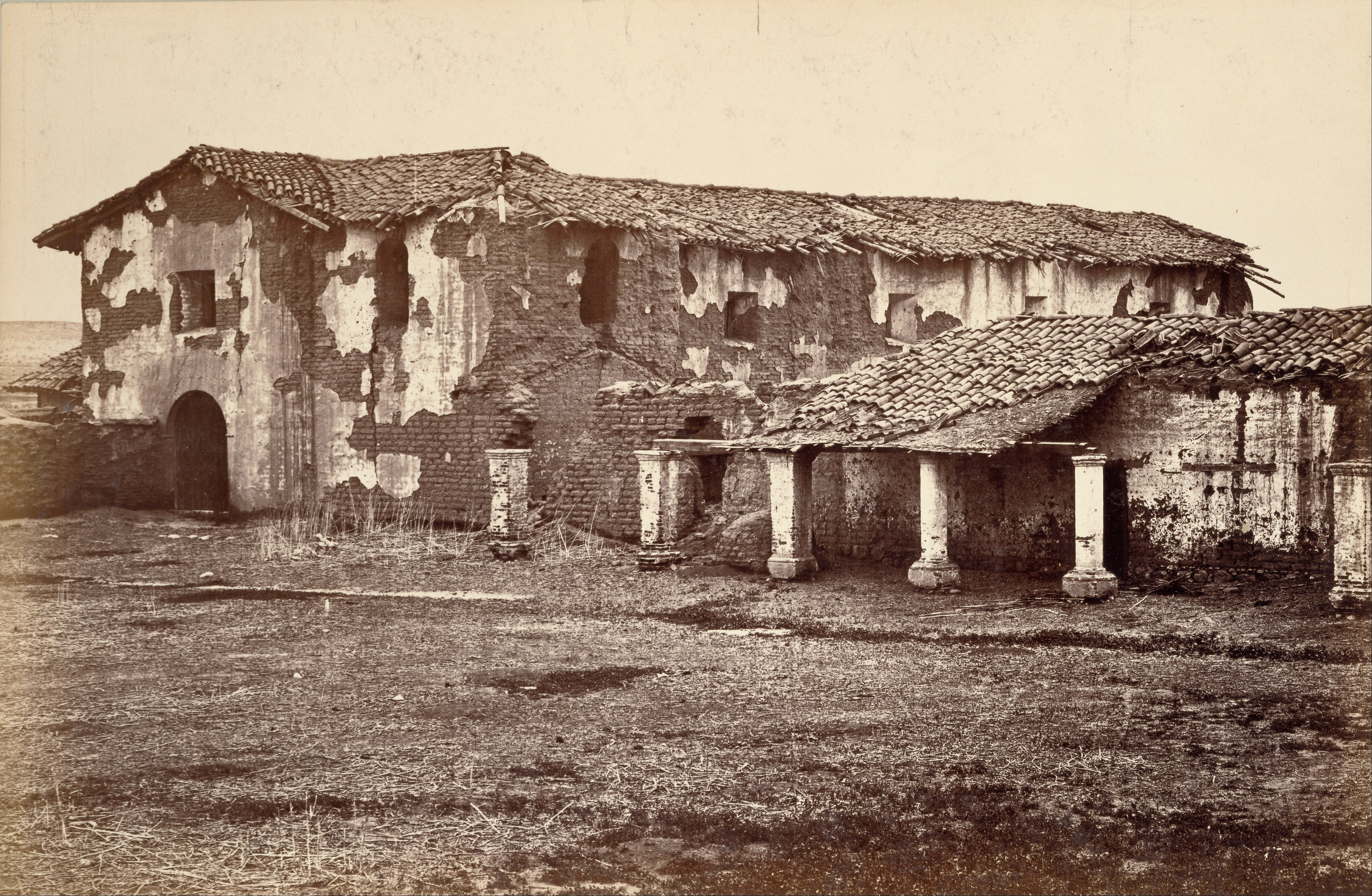
About fifty people from the village were brought to and baptized at Mission San Fernando (pictured in 1880).

With the arrival of Spanish soldiers and missionaries in the region, several villagers who were born in the early 18th century were brought to and baptized at Mission San Fernando. This included captain of the village Seuyeuyeminasu, who was given the name Jose Maria by the Spanish after his baptism in 1799. He married Teuteu (born ca. 1766), also born at Tochonanga, who adopted the name Tomasa after her baptism in 1800.

From 1797 to 1811, 50 people from the village were baptized at Mission San Fernando. The villagers joined a burgeoning Native American population at the mission, which peaked in 1819 at 1,080 people. However, by the time of secularization in 1833, although 1,367 Native children were baptized at the mission, 965 had died in that same period (or over 70% of the children). Historian James Miller Guinn noted in 1907, that "it was not strange that the fearful death rate both of children and adults at the missions sometimes frightened the neophytes into running away."

== Mid to late 19th century ==
California was annexed to the United States in 1848 and became a state in 1850. In the 1850s, U.S. general Edward F. Beale, the Indian superintendent for California and Nevada, commanded the army to round up Indigenous people and forced them to settle on the Sebastian Indian Reservation. The Indians forced to settle the reservation included Tataviam, such as Estanislao Cabuti, also called Stanislaus, who became a caption serving at the reservation. The San Sebastian Reservation was closed in 1854, when some of its residents moved to the Tule River Reservation, while others remained.

== Modern period ==
The village has been identified as being in the Newhall area, although it is unknown when it ceased to exist or where precisely it was located. Descendants of the village continued to live in the area for many generations.

== See also ==
- Achooykomenga
- Chaguayanga
- Mapipinga
- Piru
