= Serrano people =

Native American people of California

Serrano Taaqtam
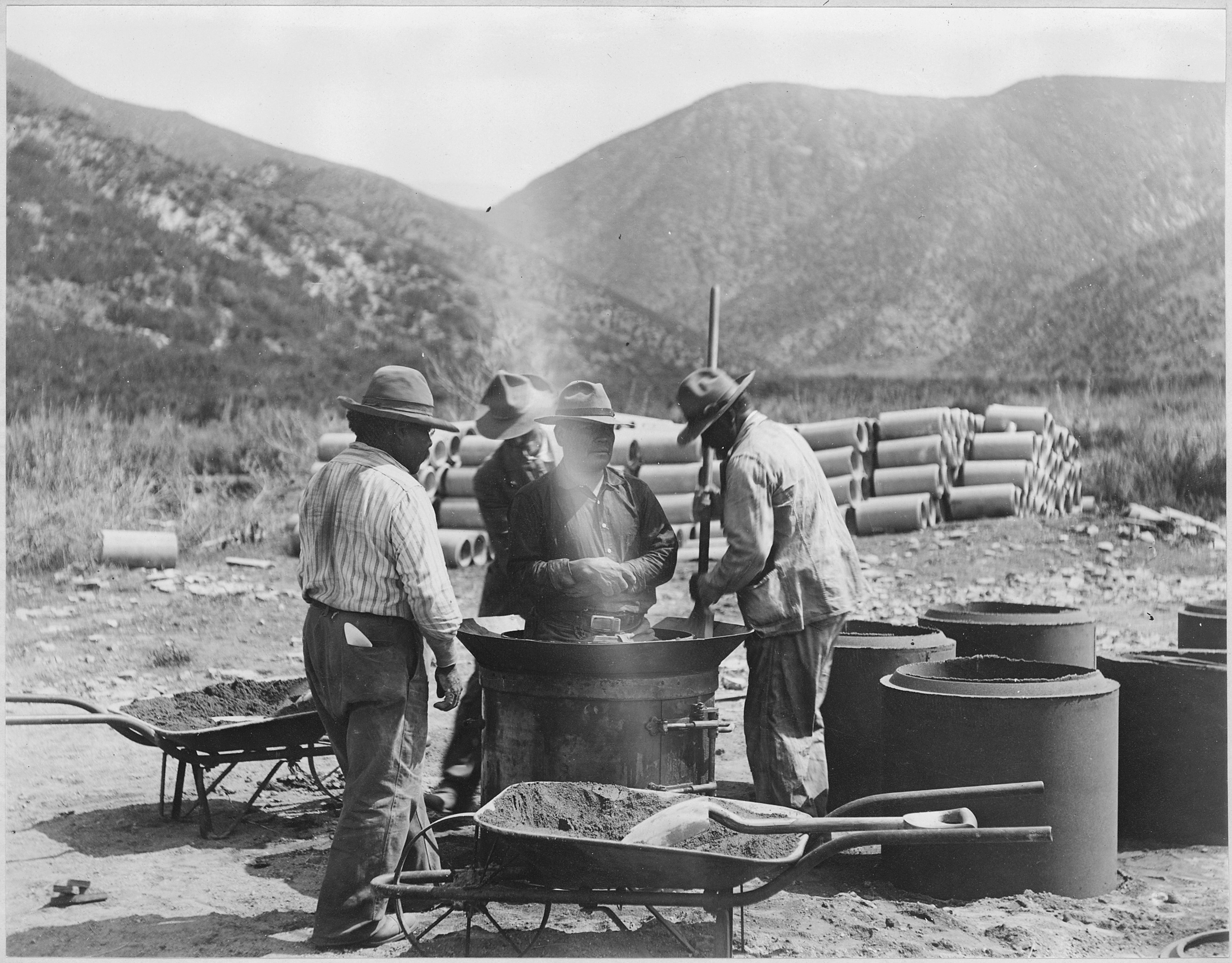
- Workers making pipe turnouts on the Morongo Reservation

Total population
- more than 1,000 (1995 or 1998, est.)

Regions with significant populations
- United States (California)

Languages
- English, formerly Serrano

Religion
- traditional tribal religion

Related ethnic groups
- Cahuilla, Tongva, Kitanemuk, Tataviam, Vanyume

The Serrano are an Indigenous people of California. Their autonyms are Taaqtam meaning "people", Maarrênga'yam meaning "people from Morongo", and Yuhaaviatam meaning "people of the pines."

Today the Maarrênga'yam are enrolled in the Morongo Band of Mission Indians, and the Yuhaviatam are enrolled in the Yuhaaviatam of San Manuel Nation. Some other Serrano people are enrolled in the Soboba Band of Luiseno Indians.

== Territory ==
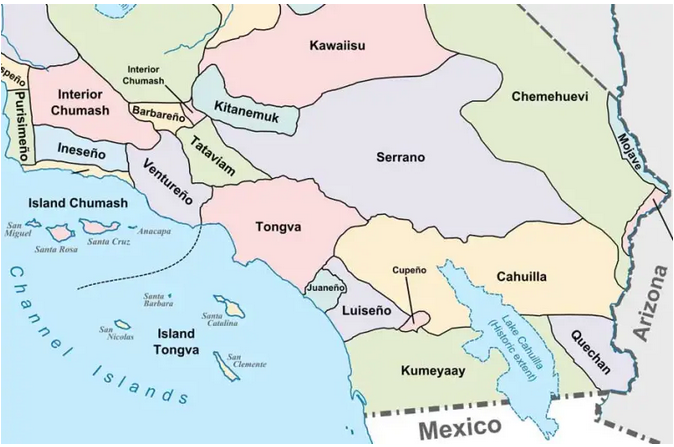
Map of Serrano tribal territory and those of neighboring tribes

The Serrano are typically divided into the Mountain Serrano and the Desert Serrano. The Desert Serrano historically occupied the Western and Central Mojave Desert along the Mojave River. The Mojave River Region begins in the San Bernardino Mountains and provided ease of trading access between the Serrano and other Indigenous groups, including the Mojave. The area of the Mojave Desert now and historically occupied by the Serrano used to have many oases, while it is now much drier and warmer.

== Language ==
Serrano language is part of the Takic subset of the large Uto-Aztecan languages group of Indigenous people of North America. The language family historically extended from Mexico along the West Coast and into the Great Basin, with representation among tribes in Mesoamerica. They were a branch of the Takic languages speaking people who arrived in Southern California around 2,500 years ago.

== Name ==
Serrano means "highlander" or "mountaineer" in Spanish. When the Spanish missionaries came into the region, in the late 18th century they helped create the tribal name Serrano, distinguishing the people from neighboring tribes who were designated as the Tongva (Gabrileño—Fernandeño) to the southwest, and Kitanemuk and Tataviam to the northwest.

== History ==
=== Precontact times ===
Excavations of two precontact quarries in the central Mojave indicate the lifestyles of early Serrano and Serrano-Predecessors. The quarries, dating back to the Pleistocene, indicate a much wetter landscape present in the desert than exists today. The high number of hunting tools suggest that local communities were nomadic hunters during the Pleistocene. Conversely, Holocene artifacts found at these quarries indicate a year-long occupation of single sites and a combination of both foraging and hunting for sustenance. Materials harvested at the sites suggest high use of stone tools such as grinding stones. Lithic artifacts found in the Central Mojave suggest high exploitation of stone quarries.

During the Gypsum period, subsistence strategies shifted to rely more on hunting, and early Desert Serrano adapted the bow and arrow. A much cooler and moister environment meant intensified occupation of the area.

Increased moisture during the "Rose Spring" period, 1700–1000 BP, is closely correlated with continuous Indigenous occupation of the Western Mojave, followed by an abandonment of the area during a subsequent drought.

The first Takic speakers are speculated to have arrived in the area around the Shoshonean Period, around 1100 CE. These are thought to be the ancestors of the modern-day Serrano groups.

=== Spanish Colonization ===
The Spanish founded Mission San Gabriel Arcangel in 1771, south of the San Gabriel Mountains and southwest of the San Bernardino Mountains. With the establishment of the mission, the Serrano lands claimed by the Spanish came under the jurisdiction of the mission and its subsequent outposts, or asistencias, in particular the San Bernardino de Sena Estancia, established in 1819. With the Cahuilla and Quechan tribes, in 1812 the Serrano revolted against it and other local missions practicing Indian reductions.

There is significant historical documentation of trade between Serrano peoples, other, non-Serrano Indigenous groups, and the Spanish in California during the 18th and 19th centuries. Diary accounts of trade from Franciscans and oral accounts from Native Serrano both discuss the Serrano "exploitation" of the Mojave River, and its use to efficiently trade both food and beads. Coastal California groups traded shell beads and asphaltum to Southwestern groups, such as and including the Serrano, for ceramics and textiles. Coastal shell beads and shell jewelry are frequently found in pre-modern Southwestern burial sites. The traded materials are treated as "prestige goods" due to the wealthy contexts in which they are currently found by archaeologists and other researchers, indicating a healthy trade economy. The power of Indigenous trade relations hindered Spanish Colonial forces from regulating [taxing] "neophytes" and hinterland natives. Textiles woven by Southwestern groups were extremely valuable to Coastal groups, and historical accounts describe the long-distance trade of these textiles through Mojave desert traders.

In 1819, Serrano were relocated to estancia throughout southern California, such as the Asistencia in Redlands, California. The Serrano built Mill Creek Zanja here, an irrigation system which provided water for most of the region.

In 1834 the Mexican Alta California government forcibly relocated many Serrano to the missions. They suffered devastating smallpox outbreaks in 1840 and 1860.

Due to the cultural suppression that occurred during the Mission Period, there was one remaining hümtc medicine man who revived religious ceremonies nearly lost to time in the early 1900s, as documented by anthropologist and ethnographer Ruth F. Benedict. Ceremonies such as the tuwituaim [dance] revive not only Serrano religious and spiritual practices, but communal and familial practices as well. Spiritual practices followed by female practitioners are often associated with the pursuit of good health, such as the hot sand pit. Women practiced health rituals to rid themselves of bad energy associated with taboo, such as menstruation periods.

=== American Colonization ===
In 1867 the Yuhaviatam band of Serrano were the victims of a massacre conducted by American settlers of the San Bernardino Valley, during a 32-day campaign at Chimney Rock. The massacre was a response to a raid, probably carried out by Chemehuevi, on a white settlement at Lake Arrowhead, during which buildings were burned. Three American ranch hands were killed at a ranch called Los Flores in Summit Valley, near present-day Hesperia. Tribal leader Santos Manuel led the survivors from the mountains to the valley, where they established permanent residence adjacent to the hot springs near present-day Highland.

In 1891 the United States established the San Manuel Reservation for the Serrano people, which took its name to honor of Chief Santos Manuel.

The Serrano historically lived in the San Bernardino Mountains and into the San Bernardino Valley, and later extended northwest through east into the Mojave Desert, and west into the San Gabriel Mountains, the Sierra Pelona Mountains, and the southern Tehachapi Mountains.

The Serrano populated the San Bernardino Mountains and extended northwest into the Mojave River area of the Mojave Desert and west into the Tejon Creek watershed in the Tehachapi Mountains. The Serrano populations along Tejon Creek were identified as the Cuahajai or Cuabajay, their exonyms by the neighboring Mojave tribe. Mountain camps were used for hunting. One such encampment was accidentally unearthed by the U.S. Forest Service fighting a wildfire in 2003 near Baldwin Lake. Uncovered were artifacts of non-local jasper and obsidian, ash and charcoal, grinding stones, and fire pits possibly dating back 1,000 years.

Serrano villages included Akxawiet, Cucamonga, Homhoabit, Jurumpa, Juyubit, Muscupiabit, Topapaibit (Victorville), Guapiabit (Hesperia), Paso del Cajon, San Benito, San Gorgonio, San Pascual, (Rancho) San Timoteo, Temeku (Rancheria), Tolocabi, and Yucaipa.

== Contemporary use of Traditional Knowledge ==
The modern Yuhaaviatam of San Manuel Nation maintains ancient trade relations with local Californian groups such as the Yurok. San Manuel Public Relations Manager, Jenna Brady, believes that these ancient trade relations should be maintained to both stimulate cultural growth and to stimulate economic security for Indigenous Californian groups. The tribe is currently analyzing prospects of new and ongoing inter-tribal relations, based on historic trade relations.

== Culture ==
The food sources for the Serrano people varied based on their habitat, whether in the foothills or the desert. The desert-dwelling tribe relied on honey mesquite, pine nuts, yucca, and fruits from cacti. In contrast, those residing in the foothills primarily consumed acorns. The foothills and mountainous regions were home to numerous animals that the Serrano utilized for sustenance. Specialized hunting groups were organized to pursue deer, mountain sheep, and antelope. Smaller game, including rabbits and various rodents, were captured using traps or curved throwing sticks. Certain birds were also hunted for food, with quail being the most significant among the game birds for the Serrano. Additionally, chia seeds, played a crucial role in the tribe's food supply.

== Population ==
Estimates have varied as scholars struggle to determine the precontact populations of most Native groups in California. (See Population of Native California.) Alfred L. Kroeber put the combined 1770 population of the Serrano, Kitanemuk, and Tataviam at 3,500 and the Serrano proper (excluding the Vanyume) at 1,500. Lowell John Bean suggested an aboriginal Serrano population of about 2,500.

As noted, smallpox epidemics and social disruption reduced the population. The 1880 census reported only 381 Serranos, a number Helen Hunt Jackson thought was too low as it did not account for those who were living in remote areas. Kroeber estimated the combined population of the Serrano, Kitanemuk, and Tataviam in 1910 as 150.

== Reservations ==
The Morongo Reservation in Banning, California, and the San Manuel Reservation near San Bernardino, California, are both federally recognized Indian reservations belonging to the Serrano people.

== See also ==
- The Eye of God, sacred site in Big Bear City, CA
- Serrano language
- Serrano traditional narratives
- Juyubit, California (Serrano settlement)

== Notes ==
=== References ===
- Bean, Lowell John, and Charles R. Smith. (1978), "Serrano", in California, edited by Robert F. Heizer, pp. 570–574. Handbook of North American Indians, William C. Sturtevant, general editor, vol. 8. Smithsonian Institution, Washington, D.C.
- Kroeber, A. L. (1925), Handbook of the Indians of California. Bureau of American Ethnology Bulletin No. 78. Washington, D.C.
- Pritzker, Barry M. A Native American Encyclopedia: History, Culture, and Peoples. Oxford: Oxford University Press, 2000. ISBN 978-0-19-513877-1
- Sutton, Mark Q. and David D. Earle, 2017, "The Desert Serrano of the Mojave River". Pacific Coast Archaeological Society Quarterly. 53(2&3).
