= Tataviam language =

Extinct Uto-Aztecan language of California

Tataviam
- Tatavium
- Native to: United States
- Region: Southern California
- Ethnicity: Tataviam people
- Extinct: June 30, 1921, with the death of Juan José Fustero
- Language family: Uto-Aztecan: Northern Uto-Aztecan; Takic?; Serran; Tataviam

Language codes
- ISO 639-3: None (mis)
- Linguist List: qc5
- Glottolog: None serr1255 Serrano
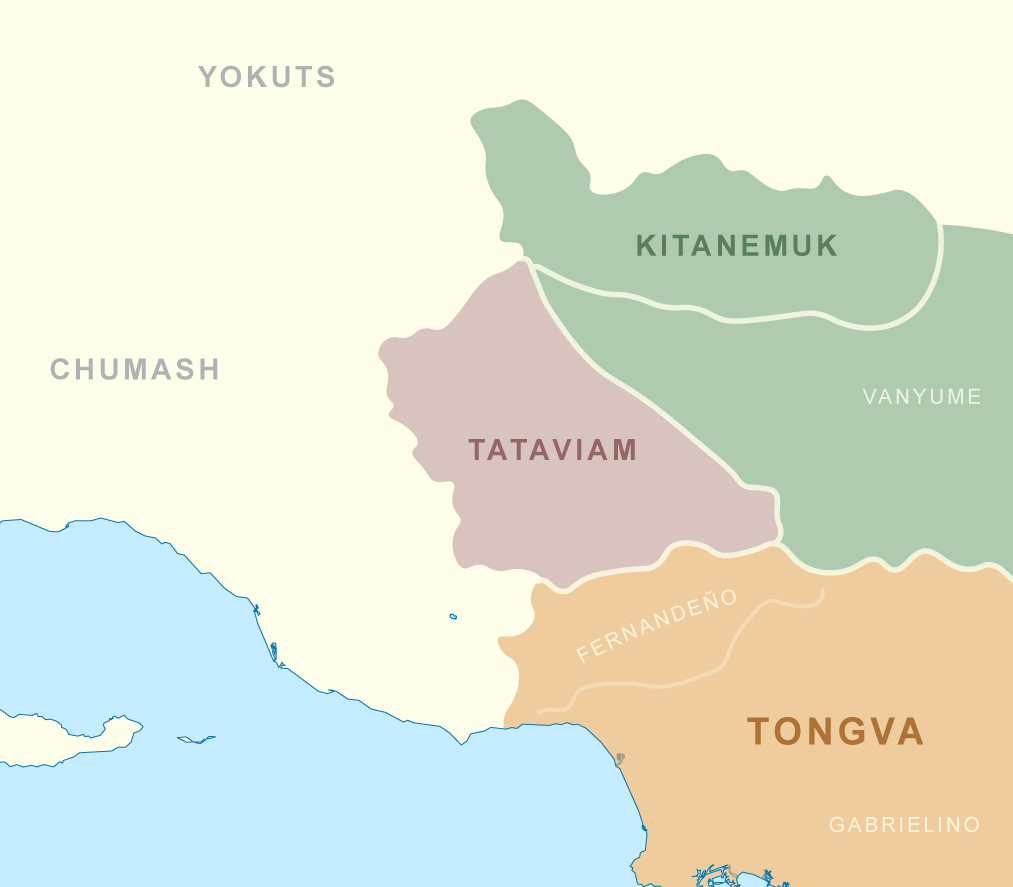
- Tataviam

The Tataviam language is an extinct Uto-Aztecan language formerly spoken by the Tataviam people of the upper Santa Clara River basin, Santa Susana Mountains, and Sierra Pelona Mountains in southern California. It had become extinct by 1916 and is known only from a few early records, notably a few words recorded by Alfred L. Kroeber and John P. Harrington in the early decades of the 20th century. These word lists were not from native speakers, but from the children of the last speakers who remembered a few words and phrases.

== Language family ==
=== Uto-Aztecan ===
Scholars have recognized Tataviam as belonging to the Uto-Aztecan language family, specifically the putative Takic branch. Based on the most thorough and most recent analysis, it is part of the Serran group along with Kitanemuk and Serrano (Munro and Johnson, 2001).

=== Chumashan ===
An earlier alternative suggestion by some scholars is that Tataviam was a Chumashan language, from the Ventureño language and others, of the Chumash-Ventureño and other Chumash groups, that had been influenced by the neighboring Uto-Aztecan speaking peoples (Beeler and Klar 1977). However, the Beeler and Klar proposal is based on a word-list collected by C. Hart Merriam while the Takic proposals are based on different word lists collected by Alfred Kroeber and John P. Harrington. The current opinion is that the Merriam word lists represent a dialect of Ventureño (called Alliklik or Castac Chumash) and the Kroeber and Harrington word list represents a divergent Takic language (Tataviam).

== See also ==
- Indigenous languages of California
- Survey of California and Other Indian Languages
- John Peabody Harrington
- Native American history of California
- Native Americans in California
- Traditional narratives (Native California)
