= Kitanemuk traditional narratives =

Myths, legends, tales, and oral histories of the Kitanemuk

Kitanemuk traditional narratives include myths, legends, tales, and oral histories preserved by the Kitanemuk people of the Tehachapi Mountains, southern Sierra Nevada, and the western Mojave Desert of southern California.

Limited information has been published on Kitanemuk oral literature. More is like to be forthcoming from the papers of John Peabody Harrington. Kitanemuk mythology seems to have shown influences from several of the group's neighbors, including the Kawaiisu, Chumash, and Yokuts. (See also Traditional narratives (Native California).)
