= John Peabody Harrington =

American linguist and ethnologist

John P. Harrington
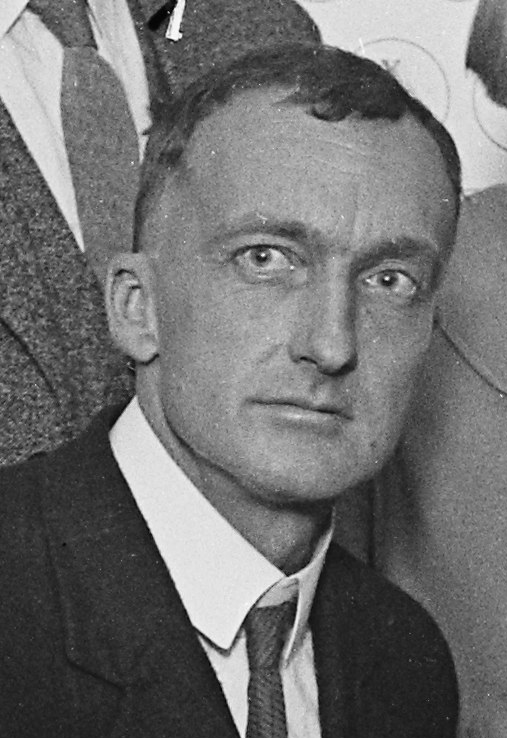
- Harrington in 1924
- Born: April 29, 1884; Waltham, Massachusetts
- Died: October 21, 1961 (aged 77); San Diego, California
- Education: Stanford University, UC Berkeley, University of Leipzig, University of Berlin,
- Occupations: Linguist, Field ethnologist
- Spouse: Carobeth Laird

John Peabody Harrington (April 29, 1884 – October 21, 1961) was an American linguist and ethnologist and a specialist in the indigenous peoples of California.

Harrington is noted for the massive volume of his documentary output, most of which remains unpublished: the shelf space in the National Anthropological Archives dedicated to his work spans nearly 700 feet.

== Early life and education ==
Born in Waltham, Massachusetts, Harrington moved to California as a child. From 1902 to 1905, Harrington studied anthropology and classical languages at Stanford University. Harrington completed his Stanford undergraduate degree with courses at a summer school at the University of California at Berkeley, where he met Alfred Kroeber.

He began graduate studies 1905 at the University of Leipzig in Germany. (Note: The entry recorded from the Leipzig University enrollment records reads: "Name: > Harrington, John Peabody; date of enrollment: 28 Apr 1905; # registration number: #582; place of birth: Waltham, Mass; birthdates or age upon enrollment: 21; religion: Christ.; father’s profession: Advokat; education: Santa Barbara Cal; field of studies: philosophy.") He also studied in Berlin for one semester under Franz Nikolaus Finck. Like Harrington, Finck was a fieldworker who studied a broad range of languages in situ (especially dialects of Irish and Caucasian languages), and Walsh argues that Finck may have been a formative influence on Harrington, who expressed his admiration for Finck in an obituary in the American Anthropologist. Harrington became intensely interested in Native American languages and ethnography.

== Linguistic legacy ==
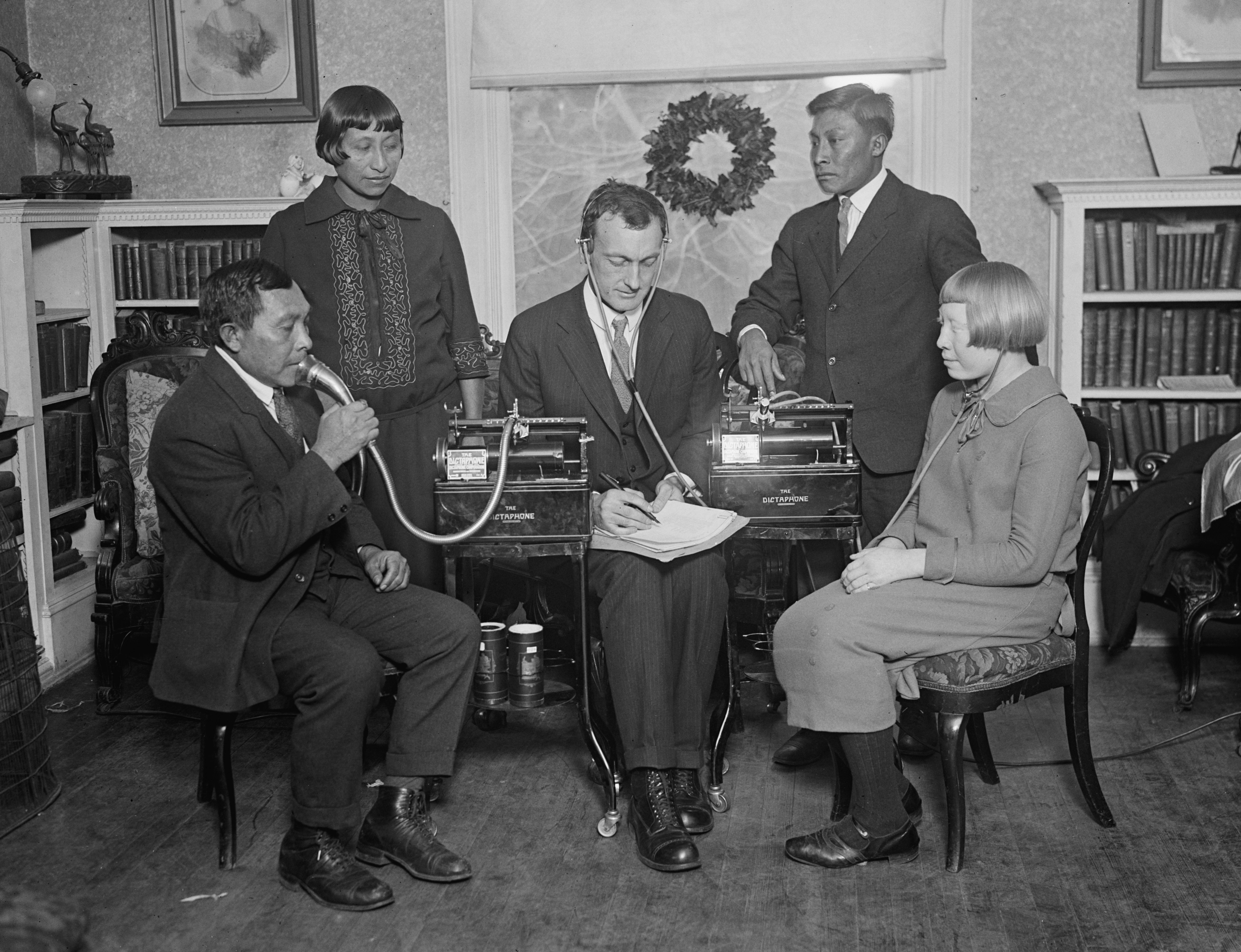
Harrington (center), recording speakers of the Guna language

Rather than completing his doctorate at the Universities of Leipzig and Berlin, Harrington became a high-school language teacher. For three years, he devoted his spare time to an intense examination of the few surviving Chumash people.

His exhaustive work came to the attention of the Smithsonian Museum's Bureau of American Ethnology. Harrington became a permanent field ethnologist for the bureau in 1915. He was to hold this position for 40 years, collecting and compiling several massive caches of raw data on native peoples, including the Chumash, Mutsun, Rumsen, Chochenyo, Kiowa, Chimariko, Yokuts, Gabrielino, Salinan, Yuma, and Mojave, among many others.

Harrington also extended his work into traditional culture, particularly mythology and geography. His field collections include information on placenames and thousands of photographs. The massive collections were disorganized in the extreme, and contained not only linguistic manuscripts and recordings, but also objects and realia of every stripe; a later cataloger described how opening each box of his legacy was "an adventure in itself." He published very little of his work; many of his notes appear to have been deliberately hidden from his colleagues. After his death, Smithsonian curators discovered over six tons of boxes stored in warehouses, garages and even chicken coops throughout the West.

Harrington is virtually the only recorder of some languages, such as Obispeño (Northern) Chumash, Kitanemuk, and Serrano. He gathered more than 1 million pages of phonetic notations on languages spoken by tribes from Alaska to South America. When the technology became available, he supplemented his written record with audio recordings - many recently digitized - first using wax cylinders, then aluminum discs.

He is credited with gathering some of the first recordings of native languages, rituals, and songs, and perfecting the phonetics of several different languages. Harrington's attention to detail, both linguistic and cultural, is well-illustrated in "Tobacco among the Karuk Indians of California," one of his relatively few formally published works.

A more complete listing of the languages he documented includes:

- Abenaki language
- Achumawi language
- Applegate Athabaskan language
- Atsugewi language
- Cahuilla language
- Central Pomo language
- Central Sierra Miwok
- Chemehuevi language
- Chimariko language
- Chochenyo language
- Chumash languages
- Coast Miwok language
- Coast Yuki language
- Cupeño language
- Diegueño language
- Esselen language
- Gabrielino language
- Galice Athabaskan language
- Guna language
- Hupa language
- Juaneño language
- Karuk language
- Kato language
- Kiliwa Ute language
- Kiowa language
- Kitanemuk language
- Klamath language
- Konomihu language
- Lake Miwok language
- Luiseño language
- Mattole language
- Mojave language
- Mutsun language
- Northern Pomo language
- Northern Sierra Miwok language
- Paipai language
- Paiute language
- Quechan language
- Rogue River Athabaskan language
- Rumsen language
- Salinan language
- Serrano language
- Shasta language
- Shoshoni language
- Southeastern Pomo language
- Southern Pomo language
- Takelma language
- Tataviam language (Fernandeño)
- Tübatulabal language
- Upper Umpqua language
- Wappo language
- Nisenan language
- Wintu language
- Yana language
- Yokuts language
- Yurok language

=== Rumsen language and culture preservation ===
In 1933, at age 87, Isabel Meadows was invited to Washington D.C., to assist Harrington with his research on the Rumsen life, language, and culture in the Carmel Valley, California and Big Sur regions. Isabel was the last known speaker of the Rumsen language. They worked together until the end of her life, on May 20, 1939, at age 94, in Washington D.C.

== Personal life ==
Harrington was married to Carobeth Laird (née Tucker) from 1916 to 1923, a relationship that Laird later chronicled in her 1975 memoir Encounter with an Angry God. They had one daughter, Awona Harrington.

== See also ==
- Indigenous languages of California
- Traditional narratives (Native California)
- Native American history of California
- Native Americans in California
- Survey of California and Other Indian Languages
