= Chaguayanga =

Native American tribal village in California

Chaguayanga was a Tataviam village located at what is now Santa Clarita, California, around the Newhall, Valencia, and Castaic areas. Its original site was located approximately fifteen miles north and slightly west of the San Fernando Mission which is in the eastern areas of the San Fernando Valley. Mixed Chumash and Tataviam populations may have resided at the village.

== History ==
The name "Genu" was used to denote the chief of the village. People with lineage to the village were known as Chaguayabit. The village had deep relational ties with the nearby Tongva and Tataviam village of Cahuenga.

With the invasion of Spanish missionaries and settlers in the region in the eighteenth century, the village came under the religious and military influence of the San Fernando Mission. Early mission records indicate several villagers being brought to and baptized at the mission.

In 1851, a man by the name of Samuel, who was born at the village, owned a two-hundred acre ranch northwest of the mission site. This land was known as Sikwanga ("a green place"), as indicated by Setimo Lopez, an Indigenous informant to John Harrington. However, Samuel sold this site shortly after, possibly because of an "inability to pay taxes or fear that he couldn't manage the land claims process necessary to sustain his title" following the U.S. occupation of California shortly prior.

In 1882, (Maria) Josefa Leyva, a woman with ancestral ties to the village, moved from San Fernando to Newhall, which was near the site of the original village.

== See also ==
- History of the San Fernando Valley
