= Cahuilla language =

Endangered Uto-Aztecan language of California

Cahuilla
- 'Ivillu'at
- Pronunciation: [ʔivɪʎʊʔat]
- Native to: United States
- Region: Southern California
- Ethnicity: 3,000–5,000 Cahuilla
- Native speakers: 5 (2024)
- Language family: Uto-Aztecan: Northern; Takic?; Cupan; Cahuilla–Cupeño; Cahuilla
- Dialects: Desert; Mountain; Pass
- Writing system: Latin, NAPA

Language codes
- ISO 639-3: chl
- Glottolog: cahu1264
- ELP: Cahuilla
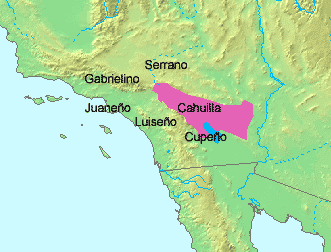

- Cahuilla is classified as Critically Endangered by the UNESCO Atlas of the World's Languages in Danger.

- Person: 'Ivilluqalet
- People: 'Ivilluwenetem
- Language: 'Ivillu'at
- Country: 'Ivilluwenetem Meytemak

Cahuilla (English: /kəˈwiːə/, kə-WEE-ə), or ’Ivillu’at (Cahuilla pronunciation: [Ɂívil̃uɂat] or [ʔivɪʎʊʔat]), is an endangered Uto-Aztecan language, spoken by the various tribes of the Cahuilla Nation, living in the Coachella Valley, San Gorgonio Pass and San Jacinto Mountains region of southern California. The Cahuilla demonyms include ’Ivilluwenetem or ’Ivi’atam – speakers of ’Ivillu’at (’Ivi’a) – or taxliswet meaning "person." A 1990 census revealed 35 speakers in an ethnic population of 800. With such a decline, ’Ivillu’at is classified as "critically endangered" by the UNESCO Atlas of the World's Languages in Danger as most speakers are middle-aged or older with limited transmission rates to children.

Three dialects are known to exist: Desert, Mountain and Pass, as well as some other sub-dialects.

== Classification ==
Cahuilla is a member of the Uto-Aztecan language family. Together with Cupeño it forms the Cupan subdivision of the Californian subgroup, other members of which are Serrano, Kitanemuk, Luiseño and Tongva (Gabrielino). This Californian subgroup consisting of Cupan and Serran languages was once known as the Takic group, a name which has fallen out of use.

=== Exonyms and endonyms ===
One of the indigenous designations for the language is ’Ivillu’at, while Cahuilla could call themselves ’Ivilluqalet (singular) / ’Ivilluwenetem (plural), 'speaker(s) of ’Ivillu’at.' Other variations include ’Ivi’a and Kawiiya. However, both the language and the people are oftentimes called 'Cahuilla.'

== Phonology ==
Cahuilla has the following vowel and consonant phonemes (Bright 1965, Saubel and Munro 1980:1-6, Seiler and Hioki 1979: 8-9):

=== Consonants ===
IPA chart of Cahuilla consonants
		Labial	Dental	Alveolar	Palatal	Velar		Uvular	Glottal
		Labial	Dental	Alveolar	Palatal	plain	labial.	Uvular	Glottal
Nasal		m		n	ɲ	ŋ			
Stop	voiceless	p		t		k	kʷ	q	ʔ
Stop	voiced	(b)							
Affricate					t͡ʃ				
Fricative	voiceless	(f)		s	ʃ	x	xʷ		
Fricative	voiced	v	(ð)			(ɣ)			
Approximant					j		w		h
Lateral				l	ʎ				
Flap				ɾ					

Consonants in parentheses only occur in loans.

=== Vowels ===
	Front		Central		Back	
	short	long	short	long	short	long
Close	i				u	
Near-close	ɪ	ɪː^{1}			ʊ^{1}	ʊː
Mid	e				(o)^{2}	(oː)
Open-mid	ɛ^{3}	ɛː				
Near-open	æ^{3}					
Open			a		ɒ^{4}	ɒː
Diphthongs	i̯e i̯u u̯e u̯i ai̯ ei̯ ui̯ au̯ eu̯ iu̯ i̯a u̯a ɛ̯a^{5}					

1. /ɪ/ and /ʊ/ are allophones of /i/ and /u/, respectively, when in an unstressed or secondary stress position. However, both /ɪ/ and /ʊ/ appear in the stressed position and are preceding any of the following consonants: /k/, /kʷ/, /q/, /p/, /ʔ/. Lengthened version of both result in their opened variant occurring. Finally, word final instances of /i/ and /u/ are always open (/i/ and /u/ are considered word final even when followed by /h/).
2. Both long /oː/ and short /o/ only appear in borrowings.
3. As an allophone of /e/, /ɛ/-distribution is unclear, conforming to the same rules of /i/ and /u/ sometimes. The word final variant of /e/ is always the open [æ].
4. Similar to the high and mid vowels, /a/ sees similar allophonic distribution where /ɒ/ occurs under stress and /a/ falls in unstressed positions. /a/ is found in monosyllabic and polysyllabic words containing only one instance of the /a/.
5. The semivowels, /j/ and /w/, are difficult to distinguish from their counterpart diphthongs: /i̯/ and /u̯/. When the semivowel is following an /i/ or /u/, it is realized as /ɪi̯/ or /ʊu̯/ (/ɪj/ or /ʊw/). When /i/, /u/ or /ɛ/ is followed by /a/, the /a/ usually becomes half-long.

==== Voiceless vowels ====
A salient feature found in ’Ivillu’at is the phenomenon of voiceless vowels (written ’) which occur in word-final positions or around /ʔ/. Word-finally, voiceless vowels occur as -Vh (a vowel followed by /h/).

- muut = [múwtʊ̥h] / /múwt/ 'owl'
- net = [nétɛ̥h] / /nét/ 'ceremonial chief'
- tukumulu'uk = [tùkumúluʔùkʊ̥h] / /tukumúluʔuk/ 'the day before yesterday'
- nepi’ = [népiʔɪ̥h] / /népiʔ/ 'my breast'
- hemu’ = [hémuʔʊ̥h] / /hémuʔ/ 'his nose'
- nesek’a = [nesékḁʔa] / /nesékʔa/ 'my shoulder'

=== Phonotactics ===
Words in ’Ivillu’at may never start with a vowel, and consonant clusters generally indicate the break between morphemic units. Whereas /ʔ/ is treated as a regular consonant in word-initial locations, it occurs in consonant clusters via infixation or insertion and is not representative of a morphemic break.

=== Stress ===
There are three primary types of stress in ’Ivillu’at: primary, secondary and unstressed. Primary is distinguished from an unstressed syllable by loudness and elevation of pitch. Secondary stress carries less volume and the pitch is not as elevated as with primary stress. Generally, stress falls on the first syllable of the root, however there are numerous cases of doubt and ambiguity. The general pattern is: ... CV̀CVCV́CVCV̀CVCV̀ ..., where regular alternation occurs after the primary stress and secondary stress is added to the first syllable if followed by an additional -CV- group without stress. Long vowels function also as a distinct -CV- unit and take stress with the following syllable unit also taking stress: ... CV́VCV̀ ... This process can be seen here:

- CV́VCCV̀CVC : qáankìchem 'palo verde,' plur.
- CV́CVCV̀CVC : tákalìchem 'one-eyed ones'

== Grammar ==
Cahuilla is an agglutinative language. It uses various affixes, both prefixes and suffixes, to change the meaning and grammatical function of words. As well, Cahuilla leans heavily on descriptive properties in the construction of nouns, turning predicates into nouns.

=== Morphology ===
Cahuilla has a rich morphology. For example, the word 'arrow,' húyal, is derived from 'it is straightened' (húya) which has been transformed into 'that which is straightened' or 'the straightened one' (húya + -l), where the verb stem 'to straighten' is immediately recognizable. This phenomenon permeates the language such that some words are examples of a double derivation, such as 'blue/green' (túkvašnekiš). The word for the colour, túkvashnekish, is derived from 'that which comes from heaven' which in turn comes from 'the thing where carrying [of the sun?] takes place,' where túkvash means 'sky' and -nek is from nek-en ('to carry,' with -en being the realized suffix).

==== Nouns and noun phrases ====
Some, but not all, nouns occur in two different states: absolutive and construct. Outside of these two states fall certain other nouns that both refuse to take a P_{1} (see below) nor a construct state form such as ɂáwal ('dog') and almost all additional animal terms which cannot be directly possessed; however, there is indication that some of these nouns show historical ties to both states, and issues present with either state usage tend to be semantic.

Distinguishing a noun from a verb can sometimes be difficult in Cahuilla, however, whereas both verbs and nouns can take P_{1} prefixes, only nouns can take P_{2} ones.

===== Absolutive and construct states =====
Absolutive, also known as non-possessed nouns (NPN), and construct states help in the classification of nouns. For nouns that take either state, the process can either exhibit itself where the noun takes one form, both forms or even more productive derivations. For example, the word for (its) flower/blossom can be: se’ish ('the flower' or 'the blossom'), se’i ('its blossom'), se’ishki ('its flower') where se’- means to blossom and ish is the relativizing and absolutive suffix. Thus, se’ish means 'blossom/flower' or, more literally, 'having completed the act of blossoming.'

The absolutive state occurs when a relational expression is transformed into an absolute expression, or when a predicate becomes an argument that can then be assigned to a particular place in a predicate. This state is constructed using the absolutive suffix, being one of four consonants (-t, -sh, -l, -ll). The suffix often is found in amalgamation with the preceding vowel, mostly -a or -i; however the case may be that there are more complex underlying functions than just that of the absolutive suffix.

The construct state is marked with P_{1} relational constructions and translates very roughly to possession.

constr.

- nepush : 'my eye'
- ne’ash : 'my pet'
- netevingiki : 'my little basket'

absol.

- puchill : 'the eye, seed(s)'
- ’achill : 'the pet'
- tevingill : 'the little basket'

absol. & constr.

- netevingillki : 'my little basket'

===== Inflection =====
====== Prefixes ======
Inflection in Cahuilla is realized through both prefixation and suffixation, where prefixes mark the distinction of persons and suffixes mark plurality and case. Both O and P_{2} may co-occur, which sees O precede P_{2}; P_{2} may precede P_{1}. Never can all three prefixes occur simultaneously. O, for example, cannot combine with P_{1} within nouns (it can within verbs); P_{2} can only occur in nouns.

Verbs	Nouns	Nouns
O + P1	P2 + P1	O + P2

O or object prefixes
	Singular	Plural
1st	ne-	cheme-
2nd	’e-	’eme-
3rd	pe-	me-

P_{2} prefixes
	Singular	Plural
1st	hen-	’esh-, ’ish-
2nd	’et-	’eme-
3rd	-y- or Ø^{2}	Ø

P_{1} prefixes
	Singular	Plural
1st	ne-	chem-
2nd	’e-	’em-
3rd	he- or Ø^{1}	hem-

1. he- is only found alongside monosyllabic noun stems.
2. -y only occurs if an O prefix precedes it.

====== Suffixes ======
Number is marked with the suffixes -m, -em, -im and -am (táxliswetem 'the Indigenous people'), making a simple singular/plural distinction. Some nouns are not pluralizable, such as qwiñill 'acorn(s)' or meñikish 'mesquite bean(s).'

The object is marked with the oblique case suffix (obl) -i, -y and -iy which sometimes includes glottalization either through insertion or infixation:

- taxliswet : 'the Indigenous person' (sing. subject)
- taxliswe't-i : 'id.' (sing. object)
- taxliswet-em : 'the Indigenous people' (plur. subject)
- taxliswet-m-i : 'id.' (plur. object)

The other cases are the: locative -nga' (loc), lative -(i)ka (lat) and abl -ax (abl), marking roughly location/placement, direction/towards and point of departure, respectively. The lative case appears to combine only with construct state nouns only:

- ku-t : 'fire' (-ku- + npn)
- ku-t-nga' / ku-nga' : 'in the fire'
- ku-yka / kut-ika : 'into the fire'

Case and plural endings can combine with one another, especially the locative and ablative:

- taxliswet-m-i : 'the Indigenous people'
- tema-l-nga-x / tema-nga-x : 'from the earth'

===== Pronouns =====
Pronouns in ’Ivillu’at can be broken down into three categories: personal, question/answer – indefinite and non-personal – non-question/answer – non-indefinite.

Independent personal pronouns
		Singular		Plural	
		Accented	Clitic	Accented	Clitic
1st	subj.	ne'	ne'	chemem čém	chem
1st	obj.	ne'iy		chememi	
2nd	subj.	'e'	'e	'emem 'em	'em
2nd	obj.	'e'iy		'ememi	

===== Nominalizers =====
Nominalization, or the creation of nouns from verbs and adverbs as is the case in ’Ivillu’at, occurs fairly frequently.

====== Verbial nominalizers ======
Seiler lists ten nominalizers attached to the verb playing a wide range of functions.

-ka(t) 'inceptive'
Using Seiler's terminology, this nominalizer indicates an oriented relationship in the noun/action, very similar to the nominal suffix -ka(t) (see below). As tense plays little role in the language, this should not be taken to mean 'future.'

me– hish– qwá' –kat –em
O- P2- STEM -SUFF -SUFF
3SG 1PL eat NOM PL
them we eat lit. 'We are one who are going to eat them.';
'We are going to eat them.'

’eme– chem– kí’iw –wen .. ’eme– hish– wáykini –kat –em
O- P1- STEM -SUFF .. O- P2- STEM -SUFF -SUFF
2PL 1PL wait DUR .. 2PL 1PL feed NOM PL
you we wait .. you we feed
'We are waiting for you so that we may be going to feed you.'

-(a)k(t) 'excellence'
This denotes goodness or excellence.

(’e’) .. ’et– mú –ak
PRON .. P2- STEM -SUFF
2SG .. 2SG shoot NOM
you .. you shoot excelling
'You are a good shooter.'

(ne’) .. hen– néh –ak
PRON .. P2- STEM -SUFF
1SG .. 1SG {weave baskets} NOM
I .. I {weave baskets} excelling
'I am a good basket weaver.'

-nax(t) 'supposed to fulfill function'
This denotes where one is supposed to fulfill a specialized function, notably in a socio-cultural context.

pe– y– píi’ –nax
O- P2- STEM -SUFF
3SG 3SG bewitch NOM
'the one supposed to bewitch him.'

táxmu’ –nax
sing NOM
'one who is supposed to sing'

-(i)sh 'completed action or process'
Denotes a completed action or being completed as a process.

támit –i .. pi– y– téw –ish
STEM -SUFF .. O- P2- STEM -SUFF
sun OBL .. 3SG 3SG find NOM
'the one that found the sun'

v-vash 'performing in a special situation'
Denotes performing an act in a specially defined situation. Compare the following examples:

pe– n– páy –ni –qal
O- P1- STEM -SUFF -SUFF
3SG 1SG daylight CAUS DUR
'I'm making it daylight' i.e., 'I'm sitting up all night.'

pe– y– páy –ni –vash
O- P2- STEM -SUFF -SUFF
3SG 3SG daylight CAUS NOM
'the one that makes it daylight' i.e., 'the morning star'

-wet/-et 'habitual or competent performer'
Functioning similarly to -vaš, denotes a competent or habitual performer. When in combination with the durative (dur, -qal/'-wen) or stative (stat, -wen), it takes the form -et. Compare the following examples:

nú’in –qal –et
STEM -SUFF -SUFF
tell DUR NOM
'the one that tells (people) what to do,' 'leader'

nu’in –wen –et –em
STEM -SUFF -SUFF -SUFF
tell DUR NOM PL
'the ones that tell (people) what to do,' leaders'

tax– Ø– nú’in –qal
O- P1- STEM -SUFF
INDEF 3SG tell DUR
'He tells [indef.] what to do.'

tax– Ø– nú’in –qal –et –em
O- P1- STEM -SUFF -SUFF -SUFF
INDEF 3SG tell DUR NOM PL
'Leaders'

híchi –wet
go NOM
'one that habitually goes.'

-ɂ’a & -at/-(’)ill 'abstract nominalizers'
These makes abstract verbs into nouns. Where -at and -ill/-’ill can attach to abstract verbs with few restrictions, -’a is restricted to abstract verbs which are then possessed once nominalized.

’ámin –at
throw NOM
'the throwing,' 'the orphan'

ne– ɂámin –ɂa
1SG throw NOM
'my throwing'

qwá’isni –’il̃
write NOM
'the writing'

ne– qwáisni –’a
1SG write NOM
'my writing'

-pish 'unrealized subordination'
Nominalizes verbs that both indicates subordination and something that has not yet happened.

vúvan– pish
hit NOM
'an insect that stings'

-vel/-ve 'event already occurring or occurred'
Nominalizes verbs in regard to occurrence of the action.

kúp –vel
sleep NOM
'the bed'

ne– kúp –ve
1SG sleep NOM
'my bed'

-va’al 'located event'
A complex of suffixes where the verbal suffix -va’ indicates 'locale, place' such as:

pa .. hem–Ø– chengen –va’
there .. 3PL dance place
'Where they are dancing.'

Combining with -al, the abstract nominalizer, there become forms such as:

pís– iva’ –al
{go out} place NOM
'the place to go out,' 'toilet'

Ø– hem– pís– iva’ –a
3rd 3PL {go out} place NOM
'their toilet'

====== Adverbial nominalizers ======
There is only one adverbial nominalizer according to Seiler's Grammar, which is -vish. It can either affix to adverbs to denote being from a place or time or denote ordering.

Place/Time

kíchan– xwan –vish –em
SOUTH‍ 'toward' NOM PL
'ones who are from the South.'

Place/Time

váani– –nga –x –vish –em
{Banning (place name)} LOC ABL NOM PL
'ones who are from Banning.'

Ordering

múluk(u) –vish
first NOM
'one who is first.'

===== Declension =====
There are three major forms of declension in Cahuilla: oriented relationship, diminutive (DIM) and special marking.

The suffix -ka(t) indicated an oriented relationship which is used most notably in kinship terms, -mal/-mal̃/-ma marks the diminutive and -(V)k(t) indicates someone or something that is marked in a special or notable way.

Oriented Relationship

pe– y– nési –k
O- P2- STEM -SUFF
3SG 3SG niece ORIENT.REL
'She (is) who is related to her, the niece.'

Diminutive

wayi’ –mal –em
{bowl of clay} DIM PL
'(diminutive) bowls of clay'

Special Marking

hen– naqa –k
P2- STEM -SUFF
3PL ears SPEC.MARK
'I am one who is marked with regard to their (e.g. big) ears.'

==== Verbs and verb phrases ====
Cahuilla verbs show agreement with both their subject and object. Person agreement, of which there are three, is shown by prefixes and number agreement, of which there are two, is shown by suffixes. Additionally, verbs take both inflectional and derivational affixes, where derivational are formed in the root. As such, an inflectional affix can follow a derivational affix, but a derivational affix can never follow an inflectional one. To be classed as a verb, the word must include both a subject prefix and at least one non-personal inflectional affix; transitive verbs must include also an object prefix.

Within verbs of the Desert dialect, tense plays almost no role, expressing past on nouns and noun phrases with the suffix -ɂa. Kinship terms, though, are excluded and use a form roughly translated to be 'past existence of kinsperson.' However, while tense plays little role within the verb phrase, aspect and mode are present throughout.

- Aspect
  - Status
    (actuality of event)
    - + Realized
    - – Realized
      - Possible (mode)
      - Expected (mode)
      - Desired (mode)
  - Perspective
    - + Absolute
    - – Absolute

===== Inflection =====
Every verb must take both -2 (subject) and at least on inflectional affix from -1 or +1 alongside the necessary stem. -1 and +1 are incompatible as is -4 and -1, as -4 only occurs in combination with +1's -nem.

Inflection positioning
–4	–3	–2	–1	STEM	+1
hax- / ’ax- expect., absol. (pros)	ne- Obj. 1sing.	ne- Subj. 1sing.	pe_{2}- localis		-’i realized, absol. (perf)
Ø expect., non-absol.	’e- 2 sing.	’e- 2 sing.			-Ø non-realized, non-absol.
	pe- 3 sing.	Ø- 3 sing.			-nem expect.
	cheme- 1 plur.	chem- 1 plur.			-pulu’ / -pu’ / -alu’ possib. (sjv)
	’eme- 2 plur.	’em- 2 plur.			-e injunctive, absol., sing. (imp)
	me- 3 plur.	hem- 3 plur.			-am injunctive, absol., plur. (imp)
					-na injunctive, non-absol. (inj)
	tax- reflex./indef.				-ve subordin., realized
					-pi subordin., non-realized
					-nuk subordin., gerundial
					-pa subord., when

===== Derivation =====
Derivation within the verb phrase takes on a variety of characteristics. Derivational affixes can be classified into one of two categories: endocentric and exocentric, where endocentrically deriving affixes occur about twice as often as exocentric ones. The difference is established upon the change in distribution class which can take the form of a derivation of a verbal stem from a nominal basis or a transitive stem from an intransitive one.

Derivational positioning
	–1	ROOT	+1	+2	position shiftable	+3	+4	+5
Endo.	yu-		-vi- -lu-	-ni- caus	-max-	-wen		
Exo.	che- pe_{3}- (ke-) vuk-	'distrib.': redupl. variant	'distrib.': suff. variant			-puli- -ngi- -ichi- -vaneken -ikaw- -vichu-	-law-	-qal

Definition divergence
Affix	-max- 'benefactive' ben	-wen- 'state'	-púli- 'goal-oriented movement'	-ngi- 'do sth. surpisingly' 'do sth. all ver the place'	-ichi- 'do sth. on one's way'	-ikaw- 'do sth. in different places'	-qal- 'durative' dur
Root	-máx- 'to give'	-wén- 'to be placed'	-púli- 'to fall'	-ngíi- 'to return'	-híchi- 'to go'	-yékaw- 'to collect'	-qál- 'to lie'

=== Syntax ===
Although Cahuilla employs a relatively free word order, its underlying classification is that of a subject–object–verb (or SOV) language. Its verbs show heavy agreement, indicating the subject and object even when not overtly present, and the subject and object may appear after the verb, highlighting specific usage.

=== Classifiers ===
Cahuilla contains about a dozen or so classifiers notably indicating the type of noun being modified or possessed. Classifiers cover nouns ranging from general, inanimate items -’a in ne-m-éxam-’a 'it (is) my thing' lit., 'it (is) somehow doing this way,' to trees, plants, fruits, meats, animals and moieties.

General

- -’a

Trees, plants and their fruits

- ki’iw’a
- ’ay’a
- chi’a
- wes’a
- sex’a

Kinds of meats

- wa’ / wawa
- chaxni
- teneq

Animals

- ’ash

Moieties

- killiw

For all non-animate nouns, the general classifier -’a is used, otherwise classifiers distinguish the nouns themselves. For trees, plants and their fruits, there are five classifiers. ki’iw’a is used for trees and certain plants/fruits found in a naturally occurring group, and this is used to help denote legal claims as members of certain lineages had grouping-specific sites of harvest. The word derives from the verb stem 'to wait' as visible: pe-n-kí’iw-qal 'I am waiting for it' ... ne-kí’iw-’a 'It (is) my waiting' i.e., 'It is the thing that I am waiting for' or 'It is my claim.' Generally, pinyons, mesquites and oaks factor into this usage. ’ay’a is used for fresh fruit and blossoms picked from trees and stems from the verb 'to pluck' or 'to pick' (pe-n-’áy-’a 'I am plucking or picking it' ... ne-’áy-’a 'It (is) my plucking or picking'). Individual beans or acorns are not compatible with this classifier. chi’a is used to describe picking up edible items after they have fallen to the ground such as mesquite beans, acorns, black beans and possibly corn. wes’a applies to plants and their fruits which have been planted (in a row) by individuals. Plants such as corn, watermelon, cacti, wheat and palm trees fall under this classifier. Finally, sex’a indicates food items that are being or have been cooked such as black beans, corn or jerked meat.

Other classifiers include kinds of meat, animals and moieties. Meat breaks down into wa'/wawa, chaxni and teneq (roasted, melted and barbecued, respectively). The most important classifier for animals is the relation to animals as pets, expressed with ’ash, which includes horses (pasukat), cottontail rabbits (tavut), turtles (’ayill), coyotes (’isill), bears (hunwet), snakes (sewet), fish (kiyul) and eagles (’aswet) amongst others; however, this does not include wild cat (tukut). Finally, ’Ivilluwenetem were broken down into two moieties: ’isill (coyote) and tukut (wildcat) where individuals needed to marry outside of their moiety, i.e. a Wildcat man must marry a Coyote woman and vice versa. This was expressed using killiw (nekilliw 'my partner' or tukut/’isill nekilliw 'my partner, the wildcat/coyote').

=== Demonstratives ===
Cahuilla uses a single demonstrative ’i’ ("this/that") that takes the form ’i before sonorants and ’i’ elsewhere.

It can be modified with deictic markers meaning local or distant/remote.

	Proximal		Distal	
	simple	complex	simple	complex
sing. subj.	’et	’evat	pe’	pevat
sing. obj.	’eti	’evati	pe’i	pevati
plur. subj.	’etem	’evatem	pe’em	pevatem
plur. obj.	’etmi	’evatmi	pe’mi	pevatmi

The complex and simple forms have no difference in perceived meaning according to Seiler. The inflection agrees with the sentence itself where the deictic marker co-ordinates with the subject or verb such as in "’i’ pe’ menill" meaning "this over there, the moon," as pe’ is inflected to mark the singular subject menill. Additionally, there are clitic forms of this marker: pe, pee and pey.

== Vocabulary ==
=== Word origins ===
A vast majority of ’Ivillu’at words come from Uto-Aztecan roots and there is a large shared vocabulary between neighbouring languages such as Luiseño or Serrano. Due to language contact, however, many Spanish words have been adopted into the language, such as máys ('corn') and ɂavugáaduɂ ('lawyer') from Spanish maíz and abogado, respectively. Conversely, ’Ivillu’at has taken little to no English loan words.

=== Kinship terms ===
’Ivillu’at can either express kinship terms relationally or through an establishing expression.

Relational

Ø– Ø– nési
P2- P1- STEM
{} {} {sister's daughter}
She (is) her niece (sister's daughter).

Establishing

pe– y– nési –k
O- P2- STEM -SUFF.ORIENT.REL
her she niece {related to}
She is related to her [who is] the niece.

=== Numerals ===
’Ivillu’at uses a base-ten system with unique words for 'five' and 'ten.'

=== Basic sample vocabulary and language comparison ===
English	’Ivillu’at	Cupeño	Luiseño	Gabrieliño/Tongva	Juaneño	Serrano
one	suplle	suplawut	supúl	pukuuɂ	supúl	howpk
two	wih	wi	wéh	weheeɂ	wéx	werh
three	pah	pa	páahay	paheeɂ	páahay	paahiɂ
four	wichiw	wichu	wasá	watsaaɂ	wasá	wacha
five	nemaqwanang	numaqananax	maháar	mahaar	maháar	maharc
man	naxanish	naxanis	yaɂáš	kworooyt	yeɂích	wecershc
woman	ñichill	muwikut	šungáal	tokoor	shongwáala	neerht
sun	tamit	tamyut	timét	taamit	temét	taamit
moon	menill	munil	móoyla	muwaar	móyla	muac
water	pal	pal	páala	paaraɂ	páal	pàt

== Place names ==
Few place names within Cahuilla remained the same over the years with English or Spanish names taking over. Here are several examples:

- Káviñish, Qàwal Héma' and Pàl Síwish – Indian Wells
- Séx – Palm Springs
- Kísh Cháwal – White Water
- Pàl téwet – Indio
- Wìyal 'Ámuyka – Torres Peak
- Yamesével – Mission Creek
- Qáwiš Húlawet (Mtn: Qáwiš yúlawet) – near La Quinta

== Writing systems ==
Cahuilla has been and, to an extent, still is, an unwritten language. Between IPA and NAPA, there are ways to write the language down, but there is no agreed-upon script used Nationwide. That being said, the most employed orthography is that of a modified NAPA found in Seiler and Hioki's "Cahuilla Dictionary". The alphabet has 35 letters with an accent (either ⟨´⟩ or ⟨`⟩) over vowels denoting stress patterns. Words that begin in a vowel can be written without the glottal stop (⟨Ɂ ɂ⟩), but the sound is still present.

Cahuilla alphabet
a	aa	b	č	d	e	ee	g	h	i	ii	k	kʷ	l	l̃	m	n	ñ	ŋ	o	oo	p	q	r	s	š	t	u	uu	v	w	x	xʷ	y	ɂ

=== IPA notation ===
Consonants
Letter	Pronunciation
b	b
č	t͡ʃ
d	ð
g	ɣ
h	h
k	k
kʷ	kʷ
l	l
l̃	ʎ
m	m
n	n
ñ	ɲ
ŋ	ŋ
p	p
q	q
r	ɾ
s	s
š	ʃ
t	t
v	v
w	w
x	x
xʷ	xʷ
y	j
ɂ	ʔ

Vowels
Letter	Pronunciation
a	a ɒ
aa	ɒː
e	e ɛ æ
ee	ɛː
i	i ɪ
ii	ɪː
o	o
oo	oː
u	u ʊ
uu	ʊː

== Use and revitalization efforts ==
Ruby Modesto (Torres Martinez Desert Cahuilla, 1913–1980) taught the Cahuilla language to younger generations.

Alvin Siva of the Los Coyotes Band of Cahuilla and Cupeño Indians, a fluent speaker, died on 26 June 2009. He preserved the tribe's traditional bird songs, sung in the Cahuilla language, by teaching them to younger generations of Cahuilla people. Katherine Siva Saubel (1920–2011) was a native Cahuilla speaker dedicated to preserving the language.

In April 2014, the University of California, Riverside offered free public workshops in the Cahuilla language, later making a full four-class course in the language available to undergraduates and members of the Cahuilla tribal community beginning in the fall of 2020.

== See also ==
- Cahuilla mythology
- Cahuilla traditional narratives
