= Cupan languages =

Uto-Aztecan linguistic subgroup

Cupan
- Geographic distribution: southern California
- Linguistic classification: Uto-Aztecan: Northern; Takic?; Cupan
- Subdivisions: Cupeño–Cahuilla; Luiseño–Juaneño †; ? Nicoleño †

Language codes
- Glottolog: cupa1239
- Historical extent of Cupan languages

The Cupan languages are a branch of the Uto-Aztecan language family that comprises Cupeño, Ivilyuat (Cahuilla), Luiseño-Juaneño, and perhaps Nicoleño, all historically spoken in southern California.

The branch had long been considered to be part of the Takic subgroup, but there is doubt about the validity of Takic as a genetic unit, the similarities between the languages classed as Takic possibly being due primarily to borrowing.

== Languages and dialects ==
- Luiseño-Juaneño †
  - Luiseño dialect cluster
  - Juaneño dialect
- Ivilyuat (also known as Cahuilla)
  - Mountain Cahuilla dialect
  - Pass Cahuilla dialect (also known as Wanikik) †
  - Desert Cahuilla dialect
- Cupeño †
  - Cupa dialect
  - Wilaqalpa dialect
  - Paluqla dialect

(†) – Extinct language
