= Serran languages =

Uto-Aztecan linguistic subgroup

Serran
- Serrano-Gabrielino
- Geographic distribution: Southern California
- Linguistic classification: Uto-Aztecan: Northern; Takic?; Serran
- Subdivisions: Kitanemuk †; Serrano †; Tataviam †; Tongva (†); Vanyume †

Language codes
- Glottolog: serr1254
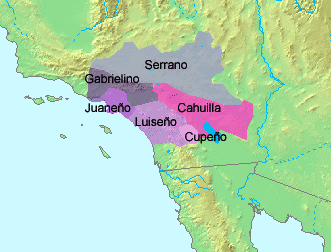
- The Takic languages. The grey languages are Serran.

The Serran or Serrano-Gabrielino languages are a branch of the Uto-Aztecan language family that comprises the extinct Serrano language, Kitanemuk language (Serran proper), and Tongva, all indigenous to southern California. The branch has been considered to be part of the Takic subgroup, but there is doubt about the validity of Takic as a genetic unit, the similarities between the languages classed as Takic possibly being due primarily to borrowing.
