= Tongva language =

Dormant and revitalizing Uto-Aztecan language

Tongva
- Gabrielino, Gabrieleño, Kizh
- eyooshiraaw
- Native to: Southern California, United States
- Region: Los Angeles, Santa Catalina Island
- Ethnicity: Tongva
- Extinct: 1940s
- Revival: since 2000s
- Language family: Uto-Aztecan: Northern; Takic; Serran; Tongva
- Dialects: Gabrieleño; Fernandeño

Language codes
- ISO 639-3: xgf
- Glottolog: tong1329
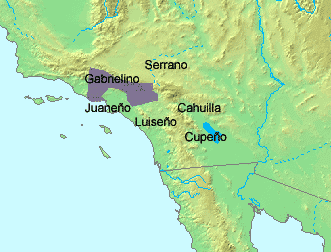

The Tongva language (also known as Gabrielino, Gabrieleño, or Kizh) is a dormant and reawakening Uto-Aztecan language spoken by the Tongva, a Native American people who have lived in and around modern-day Los Angeles for thousands of years. It has not been a language of everyday conversation since the 1940s. The Tongva people now speak English but a few are attempting to revive their language by using it in everyday conversation and ceremonial contexts. Presently, Tongva is also being used in language revitalization classes and in some public discussion regarding religious and environmental issues. Tongva is closely related to Serrano. The names of several cities and neighborhoods in Southern California are of Tongva origin, and include Pacoima, Tujunga, Topanga, Azusa, Cahuenga in Cahuenga Pass and Cucamonga in Rancho Cucamonga.

The last fluent native speakers of Tongva lived in the early 20th century. The language is primarily documented in the unpublished field notes of John Peabody Harrington made during that time. The "J.P. Harrington Project", developed by The Smithsonian through University of California, Davis, approximately 6,000 pages of his notes on the Tongva language, were coded for documentation by a Tongva member, who took three years to accomplish the task. Alleged native speakers of Tongva who have died as late as the 1970s have not been verified as having been fluent speakers.

The dwarf planet 50000 Quaoar was named after the Tongva creator god, also called Chinigchinix.

== Language revitalization ==
The Gabrielino language is a subgroup of Takic, a subfamily of Uto-Aztecan, which is usually divided into three subgoups: Serrano-Kitanemuk, Gabrielino (including the Fernandeño dialect) and Cupan. As of 2012, members of the contemporary Tongva (Gabrieleño) tribal council are attempting to revive the language, by making use of written vocabularies, by comparison to better attested members of the Takic group to which Tongva belonged, and by offering classes.

In 2004, Pamela Munro, now UCLA emeritus professor of linguistics, was asked to serve as a linguistic mentor to Tongva people who wanted to learn about their language at the Breath of Life Workshop, a biennial event in Berkeley staged by the Advocates for Indigenous California Language Survival. Since then, she has taught monthly Tongva language classes in which adults and children practice pronunciation, master the use of grammatical particles, sing songs and play word games. She calls her work "a reclamation effort" for the language. Munro has compiled a Tongva dictionary of over 1,000 words, and also maintains a Tongva language Facebook page to which she posts Tongva words, phrases and songs. According to Munro, there are no audio recordings of people speaking the Tongva language, but that there are a few scratched wax cylinder recordings of Tongva songs.

== Phonology ==
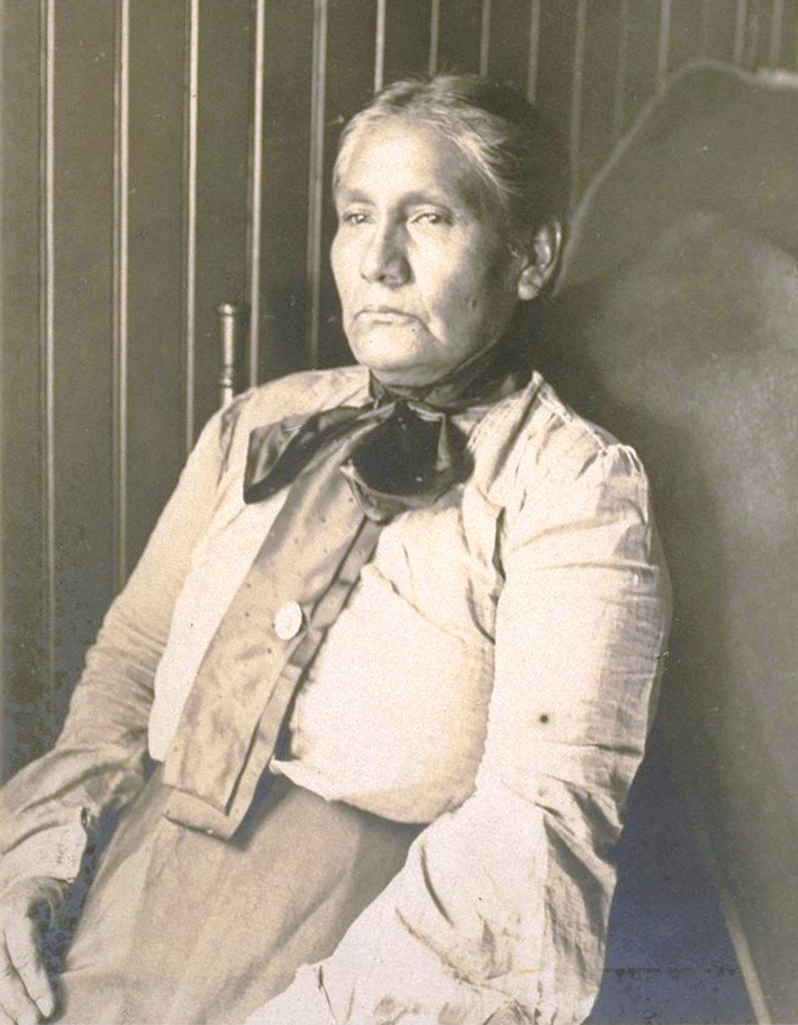
Mrs. James Rosemeyre (née Narcisa Higuera), photographed here in 1905, was one of the last fluent Tongva speakers. An informant for the ethnographer C. Hart Merriam, she was the source of the widely used endonym Tongva.

=== Consonants ===
The following is a list of the consonants and vowels of the Tongva language as used by the Tongva Language Committee, based on linguist Pamela Munro's interpretation of the fieldnotes of J. P. Harrington. In parentheses is the spelling of the specific sound. There are multiple orthographies for the Tongva language.

		Labial	Alveolar	Palatal	Velar	Labio -velar	Glottal
Nasal		m /m/	n /n/		ng /ŋ/		
Stop	voiced	(b /b/)	(d /d/)		(g /ɡ/)		
Stop	voiceless	p /p/	t /t/	ch /tʃ/	k /k/	kw /kʷ/	ʼ /ʔ/
Fricative		(f /f/)	s /s/	sh /ʃ/	x /x/		h /h/
Approximant		v /v/	l /l/	y /j/		w /w/	
Tap			r /ɾ/				

Consonants /b d f ɡ/ are used in loanwords.

=== Vowels ===
	Front		Central		Back	
	short	long	short	long	short	long
Close	i /i/	ii /iː/			u /u/	uu /uː/
Mid	e /e/	ee /eː/			o /o/	oo /oː/
Open			a /a/	aa /aː/		

== Morphology ==
Tongva is an agglutinative language, where words use suffixes and multiple morphemes for a variety of purposes.

== Vocabulary ==
=== Collected by C. Hart Merriam (1903) ===
(Merriam refers to them as the Tongvā)

Numbers

1. Po-koo
2. Wěh-hā
3. Pah-hā
4. Wah-chah
5. Mah-har
6. Pah-vah-hā
7. Wah-chah-kav-e-ah
8. Wa-ha's-wah-chah
9. Mah-ha'hr-kav-e-ah
10. Wa-hās-mah-hah'r
11. Wa-hā's-mah-hah'r-koi-po-koo
12. Wa-hā's-mah-hah'r-koi-wěh-hā

grizzly bear
hoó-nahr
hoon-nah (subject)
hoon-rah (object)

black bear
pí-yah-hó-naht

=== Collected by Dr. Oscar Loew (1875) ===
Numbers

1. pu-guʼ
2. ve-heʼ
3. paʼ-hi
4. va-tchaʼ
5. mahaʼr
6. pa-vaʼhe
7. vatchaʼ-kabyaʼ
8. vehesh-vatchaʼ
9. mahar-kabyaʼ
10. vehes-mahar
11. puku-hurura
12. vehe-hurura

bear
unar

=== Collected by Alexander Taylor (1860) ===
Numbers

1. po-koo
2. wa-hay
3. pa-hey
4. wat-sa
5. mahar
6. pawahe
7. wat-sa-kabiya
8. wa-hish-watchsa
9. mahar-cabearka
10. wa-hish-mar

Taylor claims "they do not count farther than ten"

=== Collected by Charles Wilkes, USN (1838–1842) ===
Numbers

1. pukū
2. wehē
3. pāhe
4. watsā

bear
hundr

=== Other sources ===
- desert fox: erow
- Pacoima = from the root word Pako enter, meaning the entrance
- Tujunga = from the root word old woman tux'uu Tujunga means Mountains of Health according to long-time residents.
- Azusa = from the word -shuuk 'Ashuuksanga = his grandmother

=== The Lord's Prayer ===
The Lord's Prayer is called ʼEyoonak in Tongva. The following text was derived from old Mission records.

ʼEyoonak

ʼEyoonak, ʼeyooken tokuupangaʼe xaa;
hoyuuykoy motwaanyan;
moxariin mokiimen tokuupra;
maay moʼwiishme meyii ʼooxor ʼeyaa tokuupar.

Hamaare, ʼeyooneʼ maxaareʼ ʼwee taamet,
koy ʼoovonreʼ ʼeyoomamaayntar momoohaysh, miyii ʼeyaare
'oovonax 'eyoohiino 'eyooyha';
koy xaareʼ maayn ʼiitam momoohaysh,
koy xaa mohuuʼesh.
ʼWee meneeʼ xaaʼe.

=== Toponymy ===
The table below gives the names of various missions in the Tongva language.

English	Tongva
Los Angeles	Yaa
San Bernardino	Wa'aach
San Gabriel	Shevaa
San Pedro	Chaaw
Santa Ana	Hotuuk
Santa Monica	Kecheek
Santa Catalina	Pemu

== See also ==
- Cahuilla language
- Chumashan languages
