= Serrano language =

Uto-Aztecan language of southern California

Serrano
- Serrano–Vanyume
- Maarrênga'twich
- Native to: United States
- Region: Southern California
- Ethnicity: Serrano people
- Extinct: 2002, with the death of Dorothy Ramon
- Revival: 6 (2009–2013)
- Language family: Uto-Aztecan: Northern Uto-Aztecan; Takic; Serran; Serrano
- Dialects: Serrano; Vanyume

Language codes
- ISO 639-3: ser
- Glottolog: serr1255
- ELP: Serrano
- Historical extent of Serran languages

- Serrano is classified as Extinct by the UNESCO Atlas of the World's Languages in Danger.

Serrano (Serrano: Maarrênga'twich) is a language in the Serran branch of the Uto-Aztecan family spoken by the Serrano people of Southern California. The language is closely related to Tongva, Tataviam, Kitanemuk and Vanyume, which may be a dialect of Serrano. Serrano has free word order with the only rule being that verbs usually come last.

== Speakers ==
According to Ethnologue, there was 1 speaker in 1994. The last fully fluent speaker was Dorothy Ramon, who died in 2002. During the last years of Ramon's life, she worked with linguist Eric Elliot. Together they wrote a book named Wayta' Yawa' (Always Believe). This book was written in Serrano and English, and talks about the Serrano culture and the life of Ramon, which in turn saved the Serrano language from complete extinction. After Ramon's death, the language is now considered dormant, as revitalization efforts have allowed the language to survive in some form.

Traditionally referring to themselves as Maarrênga'yam meaning "people of Maarra" (Maarra' is considered to be modern day Twentynine Palms) or Yuhaaviatam meaning "people of the pines", the Serrano people originally occupied the area near the Mojave River and San Bernardino Mountains of Southern California. In 1891 the United States established the San Manuel Reservation for the Serrano people where many of its last speakers lived. In 1967, Researcher Kenneth Cushman Hill noted that about 6 people still spoke the now dormant language. As of today, the nephew of Dorothy Ramon is seen as the last person who is able to speak the language at a fluent level.

== Language revitalization ==
The language was at a time considered to be extinct, but there are attempts at reviving it. Both at the San Manuel Band of Mission Indians, and Morongo Band of Mission Indians reservations there are efforts now underway to teach the language and the history and culture of the Serrano people. Language teacher Pauline Murillo helped develop an interactive CD ROM for learning Serrano. As of 2013, apps and games have been developed, and the San Manuel Band's Serrano Language Revitalization Project (SLRP) seeks to develop further multimedia resources for language learners. In May 2013, Cal State San Bernardino announced it would offer Serrano language classes to its students.

The Limu project offers online courses in Maarrênga' (Morongo Band "Serrano" dialect) and Yuhaviat (San Manuel Band "Serrano" dialect).

The Serrano language was traditionally a spoken language; an alphabet was not used until the 1990s. A new alphabet, with 47 letters, including the glottal stop, was developed starting in 2005.

The Endangered Languages Project lists Serrano as in the "awakening" stage, meaning that the language has lost its native and fluent speakers and can be considered "extinct" but has revitalization projects underway to preserve knowledge of the language and the Serrano people.

The University of California, Los Angeles provides a recording of a Serrano speaker reading a word list.

== Phonology ==
The charts of consonants and vowels below indicate phonemes used in the Serrano language:

In 1967, Serrano was described as having 33 consonants and 9 vowels.

=== Consonants ===
		Bilabial	Alveolar	Retroflex	Palatal	Velar		Uvular		Glottal	
		Bilabial	Alveolar	Retroflex	Palatal	plain	lab.	plain	lab.	plain	lab.
Nasal		m	n	ɳ	ɲ	ŋ	ŋʷ				
Plosive	voiceless	p	t	ʈ		k	kʷ	q	qʷ	ʔ	
Plosive	voiced	b	d		d͡ʒ	ɡ					
Plosive	affricate			t͡ʂ	t͡ʃ						
Fricative	voiceless	ɸ	s	ʂ	ʃ	x	xʷ	χ	χʷ	h	hʷ
Fricative	voiced	β									
Rhotic			ɾ~r								
Lateral			l		ʎ						
Sonorant					j		w				

=== Vowels ===
	Front	Central		Back	
	Front	oral	rhotic	oral	rhotic
High	i	ɨ	ɨ˞	u	
Mid	e			o	o˞
Low		a	a˞		

Vowels /ɨ/, /a/, /o/, can be rhoticized as /ɨ˞/, /a˞/, /o˞/.

== Morphology ==
Serrano is an agglutinative language, where words use suffix complexes for a variety of purposes with several morphemes strung together.
