= Kitanemuk language =

Northern Uto-Aztecan language of California, US

Kitanemuk
- Native to: United States
- Region: Southern California
- Ethnicity: Kitanemuk
- Extinct: 1940s
- Language family: Uto-Aztecan: Northern Uto-Aztecan; Takic; Serran; Kitanemuk

Language codes
- ISO 639-3: None (mis)
- Glottolog: kita1252
- Map of Takic languages. Kitanemuk is to the northwest of Serrano.

Kitanemuk is an extinct Northern Uto-Aztecan language of the Serran branch. It is very closely related to Serrano, and may have been a dialect. Before its extinction, it was spoken in the San Gabriel Mountains and foothill environs of Southern California. The last speakers, Marcelino Rivera, Isabella Gonzales, and Refugia Duran, lived some time in the 1940s, though the last fieldwork was carried out in 1937. J. P. Harrington took copious notes in 1916 and 1917, however, which allowed for a fairly detailed knowledge of the language.

== Morphology ==
Kitanemuk is an agglutinative language, where words use suffix complexes for a variety of purposes with several morphemes strung together.

== Phonology ==
=== Consonants ===
The consonant phonemes of Kitanemuk, as reconstructed by Anderton (1988) based on Harrington's field notes, were (with some standard Americanist phonetic notation in ⟨angle brackets⟩:

| | Labial | Alveolar | Palatal | Velar | | Glottal |
| | Labial | Alveolar | Palatal | plain | labio. | Glottal |
|---|---|---|---|---|---|---|
| Nasal | m | n | | ŋ | | |
| Plosive | p | t | | k | kʷ | ʔ |
| Affricate | | ts ⟨c⟩ | tʃ ⟨č⟩ | | | |
| Fricative | v | s | ʃ ⟨š⟩ | | | h |
| Rhotic | | r | | | | |
| Approximant | | l | j ⟨y⟩ | | w | |

Word-finally, h becomes [r], and all voiced consonants become voiceless before other voiceless consonants or word-finally.

=== Vowels ===
| | Front | Central | Back |
|---|---|---|---|
| Close | i | ɨ | u |
| Mid | e | | o |
| Open | | a | |

== See also ==
- Population of Native California
- Native American history of California
- Classification of Native Americans in California
