= Takic languages =

Putative branch of Uto-Aztecan

Takic
- (putative)
- Geographic distribution: Southern California
- Linguistic classification: Uto-Aztecan: Northern; Takic
- Subdivisions: Serran; Tongva; Cupan; Tübatulabal?

Language codes
- Glottolog: cali1246 Takic + Tübatulabal
- Takic languages and dialects as classified by Victor Golla

The Takic languages are a putative group of Uto-Aztecan languages historically spoken by a number of Indigenous peoples of Southern California. Takic is grouped with the Tubatulabal, Hopi, and Numic languages in the northern branch of the Uto-Aztecan family.

== Distribution ==
Prior to European contact, the Takic languages were spoken along coastal California between modern Malibu and Carlsbad and on the Southern Channel Islands. The Takic languages also were spoken in the Southern California interior, in portions of the Coachella Valley, Mojave Desert and Tehachapi Mountains.

== List of Takic languages ==
- Cahuilla language
- Cupeño language
- Luiseño language
- Serrano language
- Tongva language
- Kitanemuk language
- Tataviam language ?
- Nicoleño language ?

== Classification ==
As classified by Victor Golla.

- Takic
  - Serrano-Kitanemuk group
    - Serrano-Vanyume †
      - Serrano dialect
      - Vanyume (Desert Serrano) dialect
    - Kitanemuk †
  - Tataviam (?) †
  - Tongva †
    - Gabrielino dialect cluster
    - Fernandeño dialect
  - Cupan group
    - Luiseño-Juaneño
      - Luiseño dialect cluster
      - Juaneño (Ajachemem) dialect †
    - Cahuilla
      - Mountain Cahuilla dialect
      - Pass (Wanikik) Cahuilla dialect †
      - Desert Cahuilla dialect
    - Cupeño †

== Morphology ==
Takic languages are agglutinative languages, where words use suffix complexes for a variety of purposes with several morphemes strung together.

== History ==
Historians have long recognized that Takic-speaking peoples arrived in their current placement following a southward migration from a desert homeland. This migration is termed the Takic expansion.

According to the model developed by anthropologist Mark Q. Sutton, proto-Gabrielino-Cupan speakers of the western Mojave Desert and Southern San Joaquin Valley were pushed southwards around 3,500 BP by expanding and migrating Chumash and Penutian peoples. Displaced, this population moved into coastal Southern California, replacing existing Millingstone peoples. By 3,200 BP, the group had further expanded to the Southern Channel Islands.

Around 1,500 BP, the proto-Gabrielino language diffused southwards and was adopted by a Yuman population, forming proto-Cupan. By 1000, this language had diverged into Luiseño and proto-Cahuilla-Cupeño. The latter diffused eastwards.

Contemporaneously, Kitanemuk, which had remained in the pre-expansion Takic homeland, diverged and diffused eastwards to two Millingstone, Yuman populations. These populations would later become the Vanyume and Serrano.
