= Uto-Aztecan languages =

North American language family

Uto-Aztecan
- Uto-Nahuatl
- Geographic distribution: Western United States, Mexico
- Native speakers: 1,900,412 (2014)
- Linguistic classification: One of the world's primary language families
- Proto-language: Proto-Uto-Aztecan
- Subdivisions: Cahitan; Corachol; Cupan; Hopi; Nahuan; Numic; Opata †; Piman; Serran †; Tarahumaran; Tübatulabal †

Language codes
- ISO 639-5: azc
- Glottolog: utoa1244
- Pre-contact distribution of Uto-Aztecan languages

- Current extent of Uto-Aztecan languages in Mexico

The Uto-Aztecan languages, (Note: /ˌjuːtoʊ.æzˈtɛkən/ YOO-toh az-TEK-ən) also known as the Uto-Aztekan or Uto-Nahuatl languages, are a family of Native American languages, consisting of over thirty languages. Uto-Aztecan languages are found almost entirely in the Western United States and Mexico. The name of the language family reflects the common ancestry of the Ute language of Utah and the Nahuan languages (also known as Aztecan) of Mexico.

The Uto-Aztecan language family is one of the largest linguistic families in the Americas in terms of number of speakers, number of languages, and geographic extension. The northernmost Uto-Aztecan language is Shoshoni, which is spoken as far north as Salmon, Idaho, while the southernmost is the Nawat language of El Salvador and Nicaragua. Ethnologue gives the total number of languages in the family as 61, and the total number of speakers as 1,900,412. Speakers of Nahuatl languages account for over 85% of these.

The internal classification of the family often divides it into two branches: a northern branch including all the languages of the US and a southern branch including all the languages of Mexico, although it is still being discussed whether this is best understood as a genetic classification or as a geographical one. Below this level of classification the main branches are well accepted: Numic (including languages such as Comanche and Shoshoni) and the Takic languages (including Cahuilla and Luiseño) account for most of the Northern languages. Hopi and Tübatulabal are languages outside those groups. The Southern languages are divided into the Tepiman languages (including Oʼodham and Tepehuán), the Tarahumaran languages (including Raramuri and Guarijio), the Cahitan languages (including Yaqui and Mayo), the Coracholan languages (including Cora and Huichol), and the Nahuan languages.

The homeland of the Uto-Aztecan languages is generally considered to have been in the Southwestern United States or possibly Northwestern Mexico. An alternative theory has proposed the possibility that the language family originated in southern Mexico, within the Mesoamerican language area, but this has not been generally considered convincing.

== Geographic distribution ==
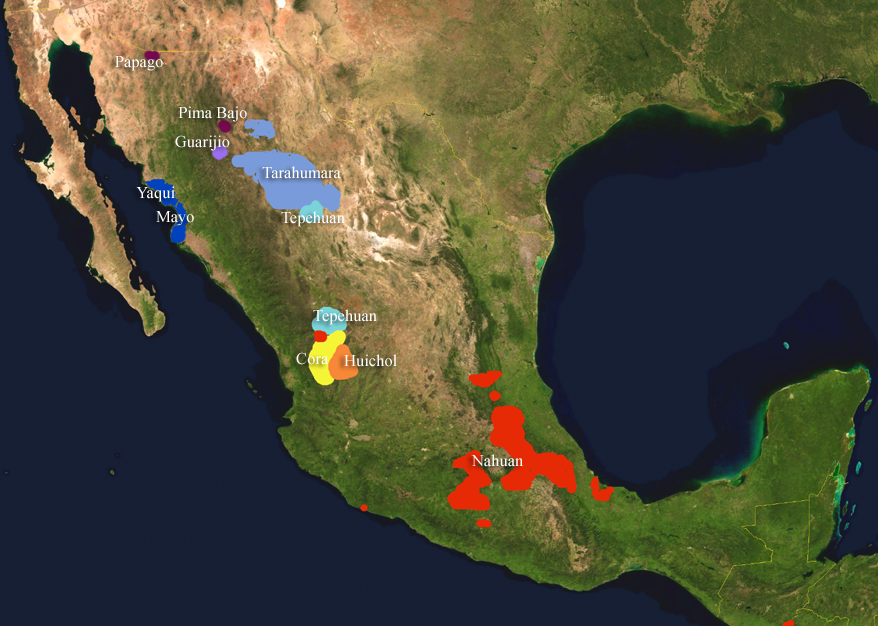
Uto-Aztecan-speaking communities in Mexico and Central America

Uto-Aztecan languages are spoken in the North American mountain ranges and adjacent lowlands of the western United States in the states of Oregon, Idaho, Montana, Utah, California, Nevada, Wyoming, and Arizona. In Mexico, they are spoken in the states of Sonora, Sinaloa, Chihuahua, Nayarit, Durango, Zacatecas, Jalisco, Michoacán, Guerrero, San Luis Potosí, Hidalgo, Puebla, Veracruz, Morelos, State of Mexico, and in Mexico City. Classical Nahuatl (the language of the Aztecs) and its modern relatives, the Nahuan languages, are part of the Uto-Aztecan family. The Nawat language, a Nahuan language, spread to Central America in a wave of migration in the Pre-Columbian era and had many speakers there. It was extinct in Guatemala, Honduras, and Nicaragua and is nearly extinct in western El Salvador, but it has undergone a recent language revitalization.

== Writing systems ==
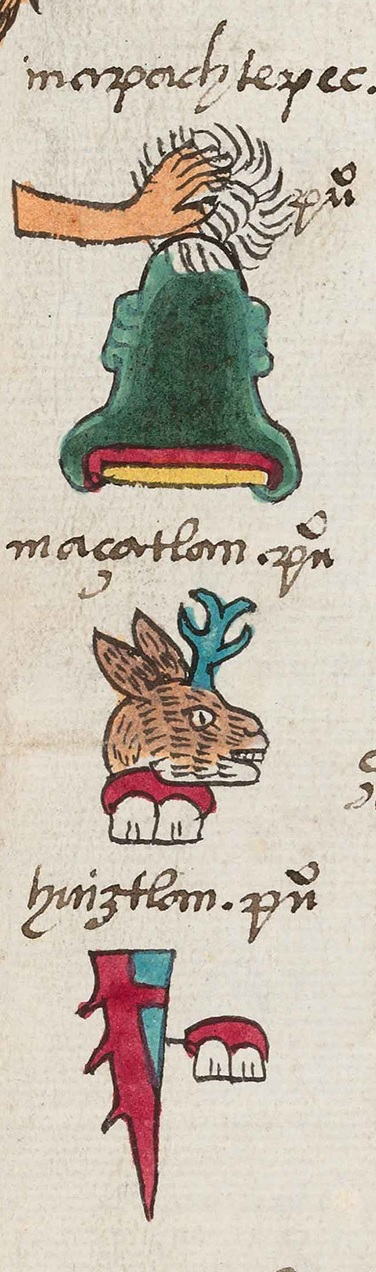
Nahuatl text

The Aztec script, also known as the Nahuatl script, is the most well known pre-Columbian Uto-Aztecan writing system. It combines ideographic writing with Nahuatl specific phonetic logograms and syllabic signs which was used in central Mexico by the Nahua people in the Epiclassic and Post-classic periods. It was originally thought that its use was reserved for elites; however, the topographical codices and early colonial catechisms, recently deciphered, were used by tlacuilos (scribes), macehuallis (peasants), and pochtecas (merchants).

== Classification ==
=== History of classification ===
Uto-Aztecan has been accepted by linguists as a language family since the early 1900s, and six subgroups are generally accepted as valid: Numic, Takic, Pimic, Taracahitic, Corachol, and Aztecan. That leaves two ungrouped languages: Tübatulabal and Hopi (sometimes termed "isolates within the family"). Some recent studies have begun to question the unity of Taracahitic and Takic and computer-assisted statistical studies have begun to question some of the long-held assumptions and consensuses. As to higher-level groupings, disagreement has persisted since the 19th century. Presently scholars also disagree as to where to draw language boundaries within the dialect continua.

The similarities among the Uto-Aztecan languages were noted as early as 1859 by J. C. E. Buschmann, but he failed to recognize the genetic affiliation between the Aztecan branch and the rest. He ascribed the similarities between the two groups to diffusion. Daniel Garrison Brinton added the Aztecan languages to the family in 1891 and coined the term Uto-Aztecan. John Wesley Powell, however, rejected the claim in his own classification of North American indigenous languages (also published in 1891). Powell recognized two language families: "Shoshonean" (encompassing Takic, Numic, Hopi, and Tübatulabal) and "Sonoran" (encompassing Pimic, Taracahitan, and Corachol). In the early 1900s Alfred L. Kroeber filled in the picture of the Shoshonean group, while Edward Sapir proved the unity among Aztecan, "Sonoran", and "Shoshonean". Sapir's applications of the comparative method to unwritten Native American languages are regarded as groundbreaking. Voegelin, Voegelin & Hale (1962) argued for a three-way division of Shoshonean, Sonoran and Aztecan, following Powell.

As of about 2011, there is still debate about whether to accept the proposed basic split between "Northern Uto-Aztecan" and "Southern Uto-Aztecan" languages. Northern Uto-Aztecan corresponds to Powell's "Shoshonean", and the latter is all the rest: Powell's "Sonoran" plus Aztecan. Northern Uto-Aztecan was proposed as a genetic grouping by Jeffrey Heath in Heath (1978) based on morphological evidence, and Alexis Manaster Ramer in Manaster Ramer (1992) adduced phonological evidence in the form of a sound law. Terrence Kaufman in Kaufman (1981) accepted the basic division into Northern and Southern branches as valid. Other scholars have rejected the genealogical unity of either both nodes or the Northern node alone. Wick R. Miller's argument was statistical, arguing that Northern Uto-Aztecan languages displayed too few cognates to be considered a unit. On the other hands he found the number of cognates among Southern Uto-Aztecan languages to suggest a genetic relation. This position was supported by subsequent lexicostatistic analyses by Cortina-Borja & Valiñas-Coalla (1989) and Cortina-Borja, Stuart-Smith & Valiñas-Coalla (2002). Reviewing the debate, Haugen (2008) considers the evidence in favor of the genetic unity of Northern Uto-Aztecan to be convincing, but remains agnostic on the validity of Southern Uto-Aztecan as a genetic grouping. Hill (2011) also considered the north–south split to be valid based on phonological evidence, confirming both groupings. Merrill (2013) adduced further evidence for the unity of Southern Uto-Aztecan as a valid grouping.

Hill (2011) also rejected the validity of the Takic grouping decomposing it into a Californian areal grouping together with Tubatulabal.

Some classifications have posited a genetic relation between Corachol and Nahuan (e.g. Merrill (2013)). Kaufman recognizes similarities between Corachol and Aztecan, but explains them by diffusion instead of genetic evolution. Most scholars view the breakup of Proto-Uto-Aztecan as a case of the gradual disintegration of a dialect continuum.

=== Present scheme ===
Below is a representation of the internal classification of the language family based on Shaul (2014). The classification reflects the decision to split up the previous Taracahitic and Takic groups, that are no longer considered to be valid genetic units. Whether the division between Northern and Southern languages is best understood as geographical or phylogenetic is under discussion. The table contains demographic information about number of speakers and their locations based on data from The Ethnologue. The table also contains links to a selected bibliography of grammars, dictionaries on many of the individual languages.(^{†} = extinct)

Genealogical classification of Uto-Aztecan languages
| Family | Groups | | | Languages | Where spoken and approximate number of speakers | Works |
| Uto-Aztecan languages | Northern Uto-Aztecan (possibly an areal grouping) | Numic | Western Numic | Paviotso, Bannock, Northern Paiute | 700 speakers in California, Oregon, Idaho and Nevada | Nichols (1973) |
| Uto-Aztecan languages | Northern Uto-Aztecan (possibly an areal grouping) | Numic | Western Numic | Mono | About 40 speakers in California | Lamb (1958) |
| Uto-Aztecan languages | Northern Uto-Aztecan (possibly an areal grouping) | Numic | Central Numic | Shoshoni, Goshiute | 1000 fluent speakers and 1000 learners in Wyoming, Utah, Nevada, Idaho | McLaughlin (2012) |
| Uto-Aztecan languages | Northern Uto-Aztecan (possibly an areal grouping) | Numic | Central Numic | Comanche | Less than 9 native speakers | Robinson & Armagost (1990) |
| Uto-Aztecan languages | Northern Uto-Aztecan (possibly an areal grouping) | Numic | Central Numic | Timbisha (Panamint) | 20 speakers in California and Nevada | Dayley (1989) |
| Uto-Aztecan languages | Northern Uto-Aztecan (possibly an areal grouping) | Numic | Southern Numic | Colorado River dialect chain: Ute, Southern Paiute, Chemehuevi | 920 speakers of all dialects, in Colorado, Nevada, California, Utah, Arizona | Givón (2011), Press (1979), Sapir (1992) |
| Uto-Aztecan languages | Northern Uto-Aztecan (possibly an areal grouping) | Numic | Southern Numic | Kawaiisu | 1 speaker in California | Zigmond, Booth & Munro (1991) |
| Uto-Aztecan languages | Northern Uto-Aztecan (possibly an areal grouping) | Californian language area | Serran | †Serrano, †Kitanemuk, †Tataviam | No native speakers | Hill (1967) |
| Uto-Aztecan languages | Northern Uto-Aztecan (possibly an areal grouping) | Californian language area | Cupan | Cahuilla, †Cupeño | 5 native speakers in California | Seiler (1977), Hill (2005) |
| Uto-Aztecan languages | Northern Uto-Aztecan (possibly an areal grouping) | Californian language area | | †Luiseño-Juaneño | No native speakers | Kroeber & Grace (1960) |
| Uto-Aztecan languages | Northern Uto-Aztecan (possibly an areal grouping) | Californian language area | | †Tongva (Gabrielino-Fernandeño) | Last native speakers died in early 1900s, in 21st century undergoing revival efforts, Southern California | Munro & Gabrielino/Tongva Language Committee (2008) |
| Uto-Aztecan languages | Northern Uto-Aztecan (possibly an areal grouping) | Hopi | | Hopi | 6,800 speakers in northeastern Arizona | Hopi Dictionary Project (1998), Jeanne (1978) |
| Uto-Aztecan languages | Northern Uto-Aztecan (possibly an areal grouping) | Tübatulabal | | †Tübatulabal | Last native speaker died in July 2008, undergoing revival efforts. Spoken in Kern Valley | Voegelin (1935), Voegelin (1958) |
| Uto-Aztecan languages | Southern Uto-Aztecan (possibly an areal grouping) | Tepiman | Pimic | O'odham (Pima-Papago) | 14,000 speakers in southern Arizona, US and northern Sonora, Mexico | Zepeda (1983) |
| Uto-Aztecan languages | Southern Uto-Aztecan (possibly an areal grouping) | Tepiman | Pimic | Pima Bajo (O'ob No'ok) | 650 speakers in Chihuahua and Sonora, Mexico | Estrada-Fernández (1998) |
| Uto-Aztecan languages | Southern Uto-Aztecan (possibly an areal grouping) | Tepiman | Tepehuan | Northern Tepehuan | 6,200 speakers in Chihuahua, Mexico | Bascom (1982) |
| Uto-Aztecan languages | Southern Uto-Aztecan (possibly an areal grouping) | Tepiman | Tepehuan | Southern Tepehuan | 10,600 speakers in Southeastern Durango | Willett (1991) |
| Uto-Aztecan languages | Southern Uto-Aztecan (possibly an areal grouping) | Tepiman | Tepehuan | †Tepecano | Extinct since approx. 1985, spoken in Northern Jalisco | Mason (1916) |
| Uto-Aztecan languages | Southern Uto-Aztecan (possibly an areal grouping) | Tarahumaran | | Tarahumara (several varieties) | 45,500 speakers of all varieties, all spoken in Chihuahua | Caballero (2008) |
| Uto-Aztecan languages | Southern Uto-Aztecan (possibly an areal grouping) | Tarahumaran | | Upriver Guarijio, Downriver Guarijio | 2,840 speakers in Chihuahua and Sonora | Miller (1996) |
| Uto-Aztecan languages | Southern Uto-Aztecan (possibly an areal grouping) | Tarahumaran | | †Tubar | Spoken in Sinaloa and Sonora | Lionnet (1978) |
| Uto-Aztecan languages | Southern Uto-Aztecan (possibly an areal grouping) | Cahita | | Yaqui (Hiaki) | 11,800 in Sonora and Arizona | Dedrick & Casad (1999) |
| Uto-Aztecan languages | Southern Uto-Aztecan (possibly an areal grouping) | Cahita | | Mayo | 33,000 in Sinaloa and Sonora | Freeze (1989) |
| Uto-Aztecan languages | Southern Uto-Aztecan (possibly an areal grouping) | Opatan | | †Ópata | Extinct since approx. 1930. Spoken in Sonora. | Shaul (2001) |
| Uto-Aztecan languages | Southern Uto-Aztecan (possibly an areal grouping) | Opatan | | †Eudeve | Spoken in Sonora, but extinct since 1940 | Lionnet (1986) |
| Uto-Aztecan languages | Southern Uto-Aztecan (possibly an areal grouping) | Corachol | | Cora | 13,600 speakers in northern Nayarit | Casad (1984) |
| Uto-Aztecan languages | Southern Uto-Aztecan (possibly an areal grouping) | Corachol | | Huichol | 17,800 speakers in Nayarit, Jalisco, and western Zacatecas. | Iturrioz Leza & Ramírez de la Cruz (2001) |
| Uto-Aztecan languages | Southern Uto-Aztecan (possibly an areal grouping) | Aztecan (Nahuan) | | †Pochutec | Extinct since 1970s, spoken on the coast of Oaxaca | Boas (1917) |
| Uto-Aztecan languages | Southern Uto-Aztecan (possibly an areal grouping) | Aztecan (Nahuan) | Core Nahuan | Pipil | 20–40 speakers in El Salvador | Campbell (1985) |
| Uto-Aztecan languages | Southern Uto-Aztecan (possibly an areal grouping) | Aztecan (Nahuan) | Core Nahuan | Nahuatl | 1,500,000 speakers in Central Mexico | Launey (1986), Langacker (1979) |

In addition to the above languages for which linguistic evidence exists, it is suspected that among dozens of now extinct, undocumented or poorly known languages of northern Mexico, many were Uto-Aztecan.

=== Extinct languages ===
A large number of languages known only from brief mentions are thought to have been Uto-Aztecan languages that became extinct before being documented after 1500.

=== Proposed external relations ===
An "Aztec–Tanoan" macrofamily that unites the Uto-Aztecan languages with the Tanoan languages of the southwestern United States was first proposed by Edward Sapir in the early 20th century, and later supported with potential lexical evidence by other scholars. This proposal has received much criticism about the validity of the proposed cognate sets and has been largely abandoned since the end of the last century as unproven.

== Sources ==
- Brown, Cecil H. (2010). "Lack of linguistic support for Proto-Uto-Aztecan at 8900 BP (letter)". Proceedings of the National Academy of Sciences. 107 (15): E34, author reply E35–6. doi:10.1073/pnas.0914859107. PMC 2841887. PMID 20231478.
- Caballero, G. (2011). "Behind the Mexican Mountains: Recent Developments and New Directions in Research on Uto-Aztecan Languages". Language and Linguistics Compass. 5 (7): 485–504. doi:10.1111/j.1749-818x.2011.00287.x.
- Campbell, Lyle (1997). American Indian Languages: The Historical Linguistics of Native America. Oxford University Press. ISBN 0195094271.
- Campbell, Lyle (2003). "What drives linguistic diversification and language spread?". In Bellwood, Peter; Renfrew, Colin (eds.). Examining the farming/language dispersal hypothesis. Cambridge(U.K.): McDonald Institute for Archaeological Research. pp. 49–63.
- Campbell, Lyle; Poser, William J. (2008). Language classification, history and method. Cambridge University Press. ISBN 9780521880053. OL 10438309M.
- Cortina-Borja, M; Valiñas-Coalla, L (1989). "Some remarks on Uto-Aztecan Classification". International Journal of American Linguistics. 55 (2): 214–239. doi:10.1086/466114. S2CID 145309871.
- Cortina-Borja, M.; Stuart-Smith, J.; Valiñas-Coalla, L. (2002). "Multivariate classification methods for lexical and phonological dissimilarities and their application to the Uto-Aztecan family". Journal of Quantitative Linguistics. 9 (2): 97–124. doi:10.1076/jqul.9.2.97.8485. S2CID 205390627.
- Dakin, Karen (1996). "Long vowels and morpheme boundaries in Nahuatl and Uto-Aztecan: comments on historical developments" (PDF). Amerindia. 21. Archived from the original (PDF) on 2018-11-13.
- Fowler, Catherine S. (1983). "Some lexical clues to Uto-Aztecan prehistory". International Journal of American Linguistics. 49 (3): 224–257. doi:10.1086/465789. S2CID 143511895.
- Goddard, Ives (1996). "Introduction". In Goddard, Ives (ed.). Handbook of North American Indians. Vol. 17. Washington, D.C.: Smithsonian Institution. pp. 1–16.
- Haugen, J. D. (2008). Morphology at the interfaces: reduplication and noun incorporation in Uto-Aztecan. Vol. 117. John Benjamins Publishing.
- Heath, J. (1978). "Uto-Aztecan* na-class verbs". International Journal of American Linguistics. 44 (3): 211–222. doi:10.1086/465546. S2CID 16989534.
- Hill, Jane H. (December 2001). "Proto-Uto-Aztecan". American Anthropologist. New Series. 103 (4): 913–934. doi:10.1525/aa.2001.103.4.913. JSTOR 684121.
- Hill, Jane H. (2010). "New evidence for a Mesoamerican homeland for Proto-Uto-Aztecan". PNAS. 107 (11): E33, author reply E35–6. Bibcode:2010PNAS..107E..33H. doi:10.1073/pnas.0914473107. PMC 2841890. PMID 20231477.
- Hill, J. H. (2011). "Subgrouping in Uto-Aztecan". Language Dynamics and Change. 1 (2): 241–278. doi:10.1163/221058212x643978.
- Iannucci, David (1972). Numic historical phonology. Cornell University PhD dissertation.
- Kaufman, Terrence (2001). Nawa linguistic prehistory. Mesoamerican Language Documentation Project. Archived from the original on 2016-03-03.
- Kaufman, Terrence (1981). Lyle Campbell (ed.). Comparative Uto-Aztecan Phonology. Unpublished manuscript.
- Kemp; González-Oliver; Malhi; Monroe; Schroeder; McDonough; Rhett; Resendéz; Peñalosa-Espinoza; Buentello-Malo; Gorodetsky; Smith (2010). "Evaluating the farming/language dispersal hypothesis with genetic variation exhibited by populations in the Southwest and Mesoamerica". Proceedings of the National Academy of Sciences. 107 (15): 6759–6764. Bibcode:2010PNAS..107.6759K. doi:10.1073/pnas.0905753107. PMC 2872417. PMID 20351276.
- Kroeber, Alfred Louis (1907). Shoshonean dialects of California. The University Press.
- Kroeber, Alfred Louis (1934). Uto-Aztecan Languages of Mexico. Vol. 8. University of California Press.
- Langacker, Ronald W. (1970). "The Vowels of Proto Uto-Aztecan". International Journal of American Linguistics. 36 (3): 169–180. doi:10.1086/465108. S2CID 144762214.
- Langacker, R. W. (1977). An overview of Uto-Aztecan grammar. Summer Institute of Linguistics.
- Langacker, R. W. (1976). Non-distinct arguments in Uto-Aztecan. Berkeley: University of California Press.
- Manaster Ramer, Alexis (1992). "A Northern Uto-Aztecan Sound Law: *-c- → -y-¹". International Journal of American Linguistics. 58 (3): 251–268. doi:10.1086/ijal.58.3.3519784. JSTOR 3519784. S2CID 148412173.
- Merrill, William L.; Hard, Robert J.; Mabry, Jonathan B.; Fritz; Adams; Roney; MacWilliams (2010). "Reply to Hill and Brown: Maize and Uto-Aztecan cultural history". Proceedings of the National Academy of Sciences. 107 (11): E35–E36. Bibcode:2010PNAS..107E..35M. doi:10.1073/pnas.1000923107. PMC 2841871.
- Merrill, W (2013). "The genetic unity of southern Uto-Aztecan". Language Dynamics and Change. 3: 68–104. doi:10.1163/22105832-13030102.
- Merrill, William L. (2012). "The Historical Linguistics of Uto-Aztecan Agriculture". Anthropological Linguistics. 54 (3): 203–260. doi:10.1353/anl.2012.0017. hdl:10088/21580. S2CID 144089923.
- Miller, Wick R. (1986). "Numic Languages". In Warren L. d’Azevedo (ed.). Handbook of North American Indians, Volume 11, Great Basin. Washington: Smithsonian Institution. pp. 98–106.
- Miller, Wick R. (1983a). "A note on extinct languages of northwest Mexico of supposed Uto-Aztecan affiliation". International Journal of American Linguistics. 49 (3): 328–333. doi:10.1086/465793. S2CID 144510097.
- Miller, Wick R. (1983). "Uto-Aztecan languages". In Ortiz, Alfonso (ed.). Handbook of North American Indians. Vol. 10. Washington, D.C.: Smithsonian Institution. pp. 113–124.
- Miller, Wick R. (1984). "The classification of the Uto-Aztecan languages based on lexical evidence". International Journal of American Linguistics. 50 (1): 1–24. doi:10.1086/465813. S2CID 144398421.
- Mithun, Marianne (1999). The languages of Native America. Cambridge University Press.
- Sapir, E. (1913). "Southern Paiute and Nahuatl, a study in Uto-Aztekan". Journal de la Société des Américanistes. 10 (2): 379–425. doi:10.3406/jsa.1913.2866.
- Shaul, David L. (2014). A Prehistory of Western North America: The Impact of Uto-Aztecan Languages. University of New Mexico Press.
- Shaul, David L.; Hill, Jane H. (1998). "Tepimans, Yumans, and other Hohokam". American Antiquity. 63 (3): 375–396. doi:10.2307/2694626. JSTOR 2694626. S2CID 162215129.
- Steele, Susan (1979). "Uto-Aztecan: An assessment for historical and comparative linguistics". In Campbell, Lyle; Mithun, Marianne (eds.). The Languages of Native America: Historical and Comparative Assessment. Austin: University of Texas Press. pp. 444–544.
- Voegelin, C. F.; Voegelin, F.; Hale, K. (1962). Typological and Comparative Grammar of Uto-Aztecan: Phonology. Memoirs of the International Journal of American Linguistics. Vol. 17. Waverly Press.
- Wheeler, Ward C.; Whiteley, Peter M. (2014). "Historical Linguistics as a Sequence Optimization Problem: the Evolution and Biogeography of Uto-Aztecan Languages". Cladistics: 1–13. doi:10.1111/cla.12078.
- Whorf, B. L. (1935). "The Comparative Linguistics of Uto-Aztecan". American Anthropologist. 37 (4): 600–608. doi:10.1525/aa.1935.37.4.02a00050.

=== Individual languages ===
- Boas, Franz (1917). "El dialecto mexicano de Pochutla, Oaxaca". International Journal of American Linguistics (in Spanish). 1 (1): 9–44. doi:10.1086/463709. OCLC 56221629. S2CID 145443094.
- Hopi Dictionary Project (1998). Hopi Dictionary: Hopìikwa Lavàytutuveni: A Hopi–English Dictionary of the Third Mesa Dialect With an English–Hopi Finder List and a Sketch of Hopi Grammar. Tucson: University of Arizona Press.
- Campbell, Lyle (1985). The Pipil Language of El Salvador. Mouton Grammar Library, no. 1. Berlin: Mouton de Gruyter. ISBN 978-3-11-010344-1. OCLC 13433705. Archived from the original on 2014-06-06.
- Dayley, Jon P. (1989). "Tümpisa (Panamint) Shoshone Grammar". University of California Publications in Linguistics. 115.
- Givón, Talmy (2011). Ute Reference Grammar. Culture and Language Use Volume 3. Amsterdam: John Benjamins Publishing Company.
- Jeanne, LaVerne Masayesva (1978). Aspects of Hopi grammar. MIT, dissertation.
- Voegelin, Charles F. (1935). "Tübatulabal Grammar". University of California Publications in American Archaeology and Ethnology. 34: 55–190.
- Voegelin, Charles F. (1958). "Working Dictionary of Tübatulabal". International Journal of American Linguistics. 24 (3): 221–228. doi:10.1086/464459. S2CID 145758965.
- Robinson, Lila Wistrand; Armagost, James (1990). Comanche dictionary and grammar. publications in linguistics (No. 92). Dallas, Texas: The Summer Institute of Linguistics and The University of Texas at Arlington.
- Lamb, Sydney M (1958). A Grammar of Mono (PDF). PhD Dissertation, University of California, Berkeley.
- Zigmond, Maurice L.; Booth, Curtis G.; Munro, Pamela (1991). Pamela Munro (ed.). Kawaiisu, A Grammar and Dictionary with Texts. University of California Publications in Linguistics. Vol. 119. Berkeley, California: University of California Press.
- Nichols, Michael (1973). Northern Paiute historical grammar. University of California, Berkeley PhD dissertation.
- McLaughlin, John E. (2012). Shoshoni Grammar. Languages of the World/Meterials 488. Muenchen: LINCOM Europa.
- Press, Margaret L. (1979). Chemehuevi, A Grammar and Lexicon. University of California Publications in Linguistics. Vol. 92. Berkeley, California: University of California Press.
- Sapir, Edward (1992) [1930]. "Southern Paiute, a Shoshonean Language". In William Bright (ed.). The Collected Works of Edward Sapir, X, Southern Paiute and Ute Linguistics and Ethnography. Berlin: Mouton deGruyter.
- Seiler, Hans-Jakob (1977). Cahuilla Grammar. Banning, California: Malki Museum Press.
- Hill, Kenneth C. (1967). A Grammar of the Serrano Language. University of California, Los Angeles, PhD dissertation.
- Hill, Jane H. (2005). A Grammar of Cupeño. University of California Publications in Linguistics. Berkeley: University of California Press.
- Caballero, Gabriela (2008). Choguita Rarámuri (Tarahumara) Phonology and Morphology (PDF) (PhD Dissertation). University of California at Berkeley.
- Thornes, Tim (2003). A Northern Paiute Grammar with Texts. PhD Dissertation: University of Oregon at Eugene.
- Kroeber, Alfred L.; Grace, George William (1960). The Sparkman Grammar of Luiseño. University of California Publications in Linguistics 16. Berkeley: The University of California Press.
- Zepeda, Ofelia (1983). A Tohono O'odham Grammar. Tucson, Arizona: The University of Arizona Press.
- Willett, T. (1991). A reference grammar of southeastern Tepehuan (PDF). Dallas: Summer Institute of Linguistics and University of Texas at Arlington.
- Miller, Wick R. (1996). La lengua guarijio: gramatica, vocabulario y textos. Mexico City: Instituto de Investigaciones Antropologicas, UNAM.
- Bascom, Burton W. (1982). "Northern Tepehuan". In Ronald W. Langacker (ed.). Studies in Uto-Aztecan Grammar, Volume 3, Uto-Aztecan Grammatical Sketches. Dallas: Summer Institute of Linguistics and the University of Texas at Arlington. pp. 267–393.
- Lionnet, Andrés (1978). El idioma tubar y los tubares. Segun documentos ineditos de C. S. Lumholtz y C. V. Hartman. Mexico, D. F: Universidad Iberoamericana.
- Casad, Eugene H. (1984). "Cora". In Ronald W. Langacker (ed.). Studies in Uto-Aztecan grammar 4: Southern Uto-Aztecan grammatical sketches. Summer Institute of Linguistics Publications in Linguistics 56. Dallas: Summer Institute of Linguistics and the University of Texas at Arlington. pp. 153–149.
- Dedrick, John; Casad, Eugene H. (1999). Sonora Yaqui Language Structures. Tucson, AZ: University of Arizona Press. ISBN 9780816519811.
- Freeze, Ray A. (1989). Mayo de Los Capomos, Sinaloa. Archivo de Lenguas Indígenas del Estado de Oaxaca, 14. 14. 166. México, D.F.: Instituto de Investigación e Integración Social del Estado de Oaxaca.
- Lionnet, Andrés (1986). Un idioma extinto de sonora: El eudeve. México: UNAM. ISBN 978-968-837-915-8.
- Estrada-Fernández, Zarina (1998). Pima bajo de Yepachi, Chihuahua. Archivo de Lenguas Indigenas de Mexico. Colegio de México.
- Munro, Pamela; Gabrielino/Tongva Language Committee (2008). Yaara' Shiraaw'ax 'Eyooshiraaw'a. Now You're Speaking Our Language: Gabrielino/Tongva/Fernandeño. Lulu.com.
- Launey, Michel (1986). Categories et operations dans la grammaire Nahuatl. Ph. D. dissertation, Paris IV.
- Langacker, Ronald W., ed. (1979). Studies in Uto-Aztecan Grammar 2: Modern Aztec Grammatical Sketches. Summer Institute of Linguistics Publications in Linguistics, 56. Dallas, TX: Summer Institute of Linguistics and the University of Texas at Arlington. ISBN 978-0-88312-072-9.
- Mason, J. Alden (1916). "Tepecano, A Piman language of western Mexico". Annals of the New York Academy of Sciences. 25 (1): 309–416. Bibcode:1916NYASA..25..309M. doi:10.1111/j.1749-6632.1916.tb55171.x. hdl:2027/uc1.c077921598. S2CID 86778121.
- Shaul, D. L. (2001). The Opatan Languages, Plus Jova. Festschrift. INAH.
- Iturrioz Leza, José Luis; Ramírez de la Cruz, Julio (2001). Gramática Didáctica del Huichol: Vol. I. Estructura Fonológica y Sistema de Escritura. Departamento de Estudios en Lenguas Indígenas–Universidad de Guadalajara – Secretaria de Educación Pública.
