= List of extinct Uto-Aztecan languages =

A large number of languages known only from brief mentions are thought to have been Uto-Aztecan languages, but became extinct without being documented. The following list is based on Campbell (1997:133–135).

- Acaxee (Aiage): closely related to Tahue, a Cahitan language, linked with Tebaca and Sabaibo.
- Amotomanco (Otomoaco): uncertain classification, possibly Uto-Aztecan. (See Troike (1988) for more details.)
- Auteco: a Nahua language spoken in Ayutla, Jalisco.
- Baciroa: closely connected to Tepahue
- Basopa
- Batuc: possibly an Opata dialect
- Cahuameto (Cahuimeto, Cahuemeto): probably belongs with Oguera and Nio
- Cazcan (Caxcan): sometimes considered to be the same as Zacateca, although Miller (1983) would only consider these to be geographical classifications.
- Chínipa: may be a Tarahumaran language close to Ocoroni, since colonial sources claim the two are mutually intelligible. It may also instead be a local name for a variety of Guarijío.
- Coca: spoken near Lake Chapala.
- Colotlan: a Pimic language closely related to Tepehuan, or Teul and Tepecano
- Comanito: a Taracahitic language closely related to Tahue
- Concho/Conchi: probably a Taracahitic language (Troike 1988). Subdivisions include Chinarra (Note: Alternate spellings include Chimarra, Chinara, Chinasa, Chinaso, Chinaza, Chinazo, Chinnara, Chivarra.), Abasopalme, Chizo; Toboso is possibly related to Concho as well.
- Conicari: (Note: Alternate spellings include Concuari or Conicare.) a Taracahitic language closely related to Tahue
- Giamina/Omomil: Kroeber (1907) and Lamb (1964) believe Giamina may constitute a separate branch of Northern Uto-Aztecan, although Miller (1983) is uncertain about this. It was spoken in Southern California.
- Guachichil: possibly a variant or close relative of Huichol (Note: There are few hypotheses, the language is really dead (only 2 words survived!), see Rosales, Rosa H. Yáñez (2017-06-17). "Nahuatl L2 texts from Northern Nueva Galicia". Language Contact and Change in Mesoamerica and Beyond p. 238 and Gursky, Karl-Heinz (1966). "On the Historical Position of Waikuri". International Journal of American Linguistics. 32 (1) p. 45)
- Guasave: possibly a Taracahitic language, or may instead be non-Uto-Aztecan language possibly related to Seri due to the speakers' maritime economy (Miller 1983). Dialects include Compopori, Ahome, Vacoregue, and Achire.
- Guazapar (Guasapar): probably a Tarahumara dialect, or it may be more closely related to Guarijío and Chínipa. Guazapar, Jova, Pachera, and Juhine may possibly all be dialects of Tarahumara.
- Guisca (Coisa)
- Hio: possibly a Taracahitic language
- Huite: closely related to Ocoroni, and may be Taracahitic
- Irritila: a Lagunero band
- Jova (Jobal, Ova): most often linked with Opata, although some scholars classify it as a Tarahumara dialect. Miller (1983) considers it to be "probably Taracahitan."
- Jumano; also Humano, Jumana, Xumana, Chouman (from a French source), Zumana, Zuma, Suma, and Yuma. Suma is probably the same language, while Jumano is possibly Uto-Aztecan. (Not to be confused with the Jumana language of Colombia.)
- Lagunero: may be the same as Irritila, and may also be closely related to Zacateco or Huichol.
- Macoyahui: probably related to Cahita.
- Mocorito: a Tahue language, which is Taracahitic.
- Naarinuquia (Themurete?): Uto-Aztecan affiliation is likely, although it may instead be non-Uto-Aztecan language possibly related to Seri due to the speakers' maritime economy.
- Nacosura: an Opata dialect
- San Nicolás (Nicoleño): spoken on San Nicolas Island in California, thought to be a Takic language.
- Nio: completely undocumented, although it is perhaps related to Ocoroni.
- Ocoroni: most likely a Taracahitic language, and is reported to be mutually intelligible with Chínipa, and similar to Opata. Related languages may include Huite and Nio.
- Oguera (Ohuera)
- Patarabuey: unknown affiliation (Purépecha region near Lake Chapala), and is possibly a Nahuatl dialect.
- Sayultec: possibly a Nahua dialect, spoken in Sayula, Jalisco, Zapotlan and Jiquilpan.
- Tahue: may also include Comanito, Mocorito, Tubar, and Zoe. It is possibly a Taracahitic language, and is definitely not Nahuan.
- Tanpachoa: unknown affiliation, and was once spoken along the Río Grande. Only one word is known, which is ocae 'arrow'.
- Tecuexe: speakers were possibly part of a "Mexicano" (Nahua) colony.
- Teco-Tecoxquin: an Aztecan language
- Tecual: closely related to Huichol. According to Sauer (1934:14), the "Xamaca, by another name called Hueitzolme [Huichol], all ... speak the Thequalme language, though they differ in vowels."
- Témori: may be a Tarahumara dialect.
- Tepahue: possibly a Taracahitic language. Closely related languages or dialects include Macoyahui, Conicari, and Baciroa.
- Tepanec: an Aztecan language.
- Tepecano : closely related to Southern Tepehuán.
- Teul (Teul-Chichimeca): a Pimic language, possibly of the Tepecano subgroup.
- Toboso: grouped with Concho.
- Topia: perhaps the same as Xixime (Jijime).
- Topiame: possibly a Taracahitic language.
- Totorame: grouped with Cora.
- Vanyume: a Takic language, closely related to Serrano, of California
- Xilotlantzinca: possibly a Nahua dialect, spoken around Jilotlán de los Dolores.
- Xixime (Jijime): spoken by the Xiximes, possibly a Taracahitic language. Subdivisions are Hine and Hume. Its links with Acaxee are uncertain.
- Zacateco: often considered the same as Caxcan, although this is uncertain. One vocabulary list labelled as Zacatec shows clear similarities to Huichol, but Miller (1983) doubts this is the same as the historical Zacatec language.
- Zoe: possibly a Taracahitic language, with Baimena as a subdivision. It is possibly affiliated with Comanito.

== Bibliography ==
- Miller, Wick R. (1983). "Uto-Aztecan languages". In Ortiz, Alfonso (ed.). Handbook of North American Indians. Vol. 10. Washington, D.C.: Smithsonian Institution. pp. 113–124.
- Campbell, Lyle (1997). American Indian Languages: The Historical Linguistics of Native America. Oxford Studies in Anthropological Linguistics, 4. London and New York: Oxford University Press. ISBN 0-19-509427-1. OCLC 32923907.
- Troike, Rudolf C. (1988). "Amotomanco (Otomoaca) and Tanpachoa as Uto-Aztecan languages". International Journal of American Linguistics. 54: 235–241. doi:10.1086/466084.
