= Eudeve language =

Southern Uto-Aztecan language

Eudeve
- Dóhmenerít
- Buckingham Smith's translated account of the Heve Language
- Native to: Mexico
- Region: Sonora
- Ethnicity: Eudeve
- Extinct: 1930s
- Language family: Uto-Aztecan: Opatan (Opata–Eudeve); Eudeve
- Dialects: Heve; Dohema

Language codes
- ISO 639-3: eud
- Glottolog: eude1234
- ELP: Eudeve

Eudeve (also known as Heve, Hegue and Dohema) is a Southern Uto-Aztecan language formerly spoken in Mexico, in the north of Sonora. The language, which is part of the Taracahitic branch, is known from colonial-era manuscripts. It is closely related to the Opata language, to the point that they are sometimes considered to be varieties of the same language. It has been extinct since the 1930s.

== Classification ==
Eudeve is an Uto-Aztecan language (sometimes classified under Taracahitic) most closely related to Opata. Some scholars consider the two to be dialects of the same language. It is likely that Eudeve was next most closely related to the language spoken by the Jova, and more distantly to Tarahumara.

== History ==
The known vocabulary of Eudeve was recorded in several works, the primary being Arte de la lengua hegue ("Art of the Hegue Language") written by Balthasar Loaysa around 1662. In 1861, Buckingham Smith translated an anonymous unpublished manuscript about Eudeve as A Grammatical Sketch of the Heve Language. Smith used a different orthographical system which reflects some of the phonological differences between the variety that Loaysa studied. In 1851, J. R. Bartlett collected a vocabulary from Ures that consisted of some 160 words. He considered the language he documented to be a variety of Opata, but it was in fact Eudeve. Some time afterwards, Roberto Escalante published a vocabulary compiled by Jean B. Johnson in 1940 in Tonichi, proving that the local language was not Opata as Johnson had believed but rather Eudeve. The fact that the recorded documents span almost three centuries allows demonstration of some changes that the language went through in recent history.

== Phonology ==
=== Consonants ===
The following is the consonant inventory of Eudeve, with allophones and sounds of uncertain phonemic status in parentheses.

		Bilabial	Dental	Lateral	Palatal	Velar		Glottal
		Bilabial	Dental	Lateral	Palatal	plain	labialized	Glottal
Occlusive	voiceless	p ⟨p⟩	t ⟨t⟩			k ⟨k⟩	(bʷ) ⟨bw⟩	ʔ ⟨'⟩ (Note: Occurs between vowels of two mora and before a word-initial vowel.)
Occlusive	voiced	b ⟨b⟩	d ⟨d⟩					
Fricative		(v ⟨v⟩) (Note: Possibly phonemic, but only attested in the minimal pair bikát "I sing" and vikát "knife".)	s ⟨s⟩ (Note: [ʃ] is a variant of /s/.)					h ⟨h⟩
Affricate			ts ⟨c⟩ (Note: [tʃ] is an allophone of /ts/ before high vowels.)					
Nasal		m ⟨m⟩	n ⟨n⟩					
Liquid			r ⟨r⟩	l ⟨l⟩				
Semivowel					(j ⟨y⟩) (Note: Only in Spanish loanwords.)		w ⟨w⟩	

=== Vowels ===
The following shows the vowels of Eudeve.

	Front	Central	Back
High	i ⟨i⟩		u ⟨u⟩
Mid	e ⟨e⟩		o ⟨o⟩
Low		a ⟨a⟩	

- [ɨ] is an allophone of /i/ and /u/ in certain environments.

== Grammar ==
Eudeve has morphological characteristics similar to other Uto-Aztecan languages of northern Mexico:

- The noun has relatively simple inflection, distinguishing possessed and non-possessed forms. The non-possessed forms of the noun are frequently different depending on their function as a subject, object, or nominal complement. The plural is often indicated by partial reduplication of the first syllable.
- The verb has a clearly agglutinative structure that agrees for the person and number of both the subject and object.

Nominal inflection allows words to be organized into three paradigms, or declinations, that can be visualized in the following table:

Cases	1st declination	2nd declination	3rd declination
Subject (nominative)	___	-t	___
Object (accusative)	-k	-ta	-i
Nominal Complement	-ke	-te	-e

Many nouns of the second declination whose root has stress on the last syllable shift the stress to the preceding syllable, and because the unstressed syllable is then dropped, patterns like the following arise: arí-t "ant" (subject) / *árita > ár-ta (object); mecá-t "moon" (subject) / *méca-ta > *méc-ta > mé-ta "moon" (object)

From a syntactical viewpoint, Eudeve has a preference for SOV word order and head-finality. Following this, adjectives in Eudeve precede the noun that they modify, and it uses postpositions rather than prepositions, among other things.

== Sample text ==
The following text is a translation of Our Father into Eudeve that was presented in the anonymous work Arte y vocabulario de la lengua dohema, heve o eudeva, edited by Campbell Pennington in 1981. Smith also published it in his Grammatical sketch of the Heve language. Francisco Pimentel also presented an analayzed version in 2005.

Tamo Nóno

Tamo nóno, tevíctze catzí,
amo canne teguá véhva vitzuateradauh.
Tame kanne vená hásem amo quéidagua.
Amo canne hinádocauh iuhtépatz éndauh,
tevíctze endahtevén.
Quécovi tamo bádagua óqui tame mic.
Tame náventziuh tame pívidedo tamo canáde émca.
Eín tamo ovi tamo náventziuhdahteven.
Cana tótze diablo tatacóritze tame huétudenta.
Nassa tame hipúr cadénitzevai.
Amén.

Translation:
Our Father

Our Father in heaven,
hallowed be thy name,
your kingdom come,
your will be done, on earth as it is in heaven.
Give us today our daily bread.
And forgive us our debts, as we also have forgiven our debtors.
And lead us not into temptation, but deliver us from evil.
Amen.

== See also ==
- Opata people

== Bibliography ==
- Lionnet, Andrés (1986). Un idioma extinto de sonora: El eudeve [An extinct language of Sonora: Eudeve] (in Spanish). Mexico: Universidad Nacionál Autónoma de México. ISBN 968-837-915-8.
- Pennington, Campbell W., ed. (1981). Arte y vocabulario de la lengua dohema, heve o eudeva: anónimo, siglo xvii [Art and Vocabulary of Dohema, Heve, or Eudeve: Anonymous, 17th century] (in Spanish). Mexico: Institute of Philologic Investigations, UNAM. ISBN 968-58-0237-8. OCLC 9051249.
- Pimentel, Francisco (2005). "El eudeve, heve o dohema" [Eudeve, Heve or Dohema]. Cuadro descriptivo y comparativo de las lenguas indígenas de México: O tratado de filología mexicana (in Spanish). 1 (2 ed.). Mexico: Alicante, Biblioteca Virtual Miguel de Cervates: 137–150.
- Shaul, David L. (1983-01-01). "The Position of Opata and Eudeve In Uto-Aztecan". Kansas Working Papers in Linguistics. doi:10.17161/KWPL.1808.480. hdl:1808/480. ISSN 1043-3805.
- Smith, Buckingham (1861). A Grammatical Sketch of the Heve Language. Vol. 3. New York: Shea's Library of American Linguistics.
