= La Pintada (archaeological site) =

- Interactive map of La Pintada
- 28.5875°N 110.9656°W
- Periods: Mesoamerican Preclassical
- Cultures: Seri – Pima – Yaqui
- Location: Hermosillo, Sonora, Mexico

La Pintada is an archaeological site located some 60 kilometers south of the city of Hermosillo, Sonora, Mexico, within the "La Pintada" canyon, part of the "Sierra Libre", a small mountain massif of the coastal plains that extends throughout the Sonoran Desert.

La Pintada, a forgotten archaeological treasure, is an important archaeological zone of its kind in the state of Sonora. It offers visitors a glimpse of the ancestral cultural legacy as well as a view of its natural flora, fauna and orography.

The groups that lived here depended for survival on both; their knowledge of the territory and the availability of resources, and especially water. Their scarcity in a desert environment makes the places where water abounds in nodal points of territory. Hence, the "Sierra Libre"stands as an authentic oasis, it contains many natural water deposits, and the liquid abundance is reflected in the quantity and quality of available resources. Several containers in the La Pintada Canyon are filled during the summer rains and refilled with winter rains.

It was a spot where, according to some experts, native groups, such as Seris, Pimas or Yaquis, during their last years would hide from the Spaniards conquering weapons. It is also known as "Macizo del Cerro Prieto", "Sierra Libre" or "Sierra Prieta". Caves, hollows and rocks from this area were used by ancient natives as dwellings, funerary events and sanctuaries.

The site is located within regional areas defined as Aridoamerica and Oasisamerica. Both are defined as independent of Mesoamerica and in turn are apparently differentiated from one another by cultural traits. One group is said to be composed of hunter-gatherers and the other to be in possession of agricultural techniques.

No information is available as to what the chronological periods are for each "region" was, as both cover about the same territories, nor their relation with other Mesoamerican native cultures in Mexico.

== Background ==
Evidence of human existence in the state dates back over 10,000 years, with some of the best known remains at the San Dieguito complex in the El Pinacate Desert. The first humans were nomadic hunter gatherers and used stone, seashell and wooden tools. In much of the prehistoric period, the environmental conditions were less severe than they are today. Vegetation was similar, but its distribution was wider and denser.

Agriculture first appears around 400 BCE and 200 CE in the river valleys. Ceramics developed after 750 CE and would diversity between 800 CE and 1350 CE. Between 1100 and 1350, the region had small but somewhat socially complex villages, which were involved in well-developed trade networks. One exception to this was the lowland central coast which never truly adopted agriculture. As noted, Sonora and much of the northwest is not considered to be part of Mesoamerica, with Guasave in Sinaloa the most northwestern Mesoamerican settlement known, but there is evidence of trade between the peoples of Sonora and Mesoamerica.

Three cultures developed in the low flat areas of the state near the coast called the Trincheras tradition, the Huatabampo tradition and the Central Coast tradition.

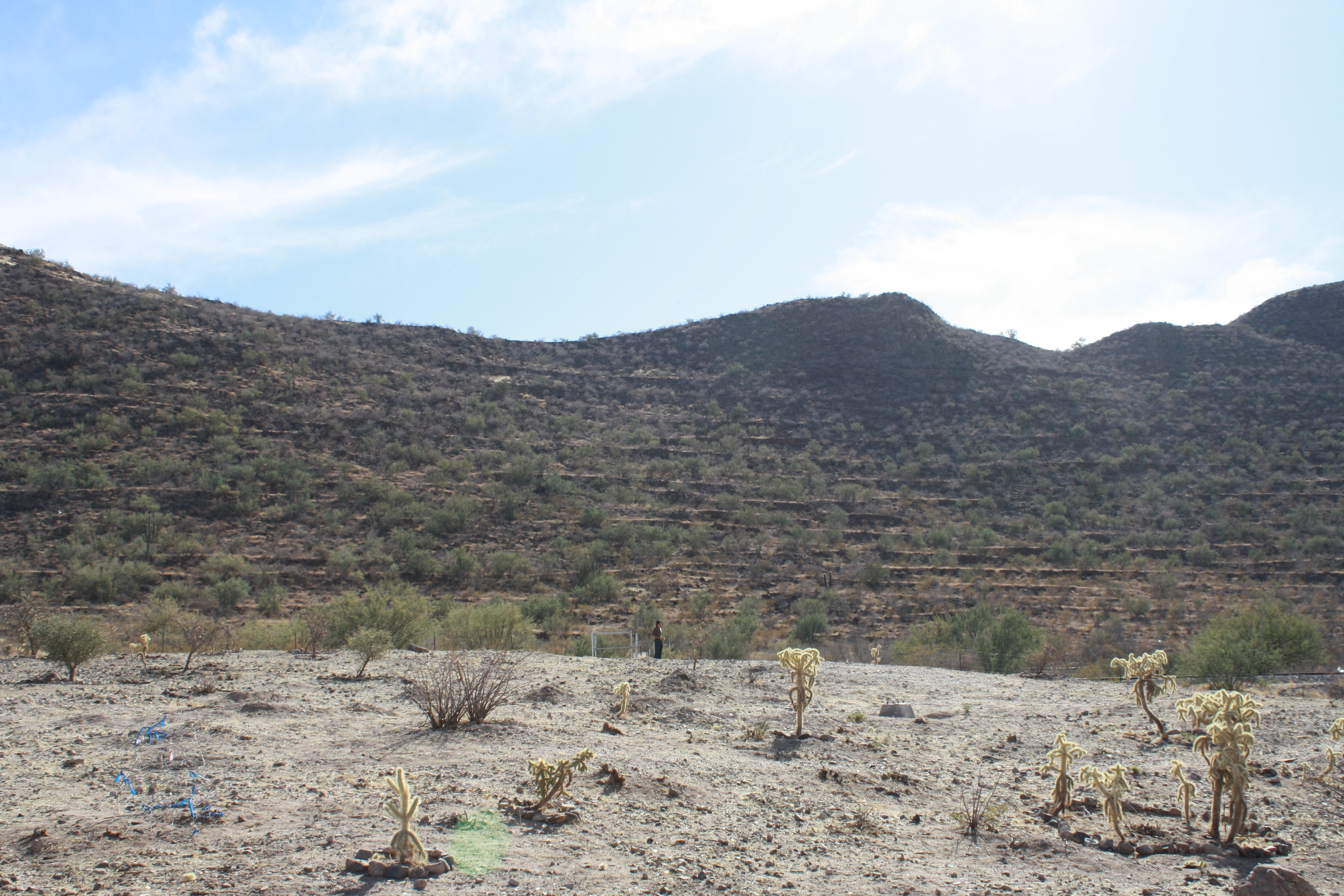
Cerro de Trincheras, in northwest Sonora.

The Trincheras tradition is dated to between 750 and 1450 CE and mostly known from sites in the Altar, Magdalena and Concepción valleys, but their range extended from the Gulf of California into northern Sonora.

The tradition is named after trenches found in a number of sites, the best known of which is the Cerro de Trincheras.

The Huatabampo tradition is centered south of the Trincheras on the coast, with sites along extinct lagoons, estuaries and river valleys. The pottery is distinctive. The culture shows similarities with the Chametla to the south and the Hohokam to the north. It probably disappeared around 1000 CE. Unlike the other two tradition, the Central Coast remained a hunter-gatherer culture, as the area lacks the resources for agriculture.

The higher elevations of the state were dominated by the Río Sonora and Casas Grandes traditions. The Río Sonora culture is located in central Sonora from the border area to modern Sinaloa. A beginning date for this culture has not been determined but it probably disappeared by the early 1300s. The Casas Grandes tradition in Sonora was an extension of that based in the modern state of Chihuahua, and these people exerted their influence down to parts of the Sonoran coast.

Climatic changes in the middle of the 15th century resulted in the increased desertification of Sonora and northwest Mexico in general. This is the probable cause for the drastic decrease in the number and size of settlements starting around this time. Those peoples who remained in the area reverted to a less complex social organization and lifestyle. Whatever socially complex organization which existed in Sonora before the Spanish, was long gone by the 16th century.

The story of the origins of the cultural super area of Mesoamerica takes place some 2000 years after the separation of Mesoamerica and Aridoamerica. Some of the Aridoamerican communities farmed as a complement to their hunter-gatherer economy. Those communities, among whom one finds adherents to the Desert Tradition, later would become more truly agricultural and form Oasisamerica. The process of introducing agriculture in the desert-like land of northern Mexico and the southern United States was gradual and extensive: by the year 600 CE (a time which coincides with the twilight of Teotihuacan), several groups had already acquired agricultural techniques.

=== Ancient Cultural Groups ===
Ancient native cultural groups inhabiting the region are the Mayos, the Yaquis and the Seris; however there are a number of other groups which have maintained much of their way of life in territory in which they have lived for centuries.

The Mayos, also called the Yoreme, are descendants from the ancient Huatabampo culture. They call themselves "people of the riverbank" as they are concentrated along the Mayo River.

The Yaquis are the ancestral cultural group mostly associated with the state of Sonora.

The Seris call themselves the Conca'ac, which means "the people" in the Seri language. The name Seri comes from the Opata language and means "men of sand."

Generally, the Seris are the tallest of the indigenous peoples of the region, and the first Spanish to encounter them described them as "giants."

The Tohono O'odham, still referred to as the Pápago, inhabited the most arid areas of the state, mostly in Caborca, Puerto Peñasco, Sáric, Altar and Plutarco Elías Calles in the north of the state. This group had ethnic relations with groups in Arizona. The Tohono O'odham have as a principle deity the "Older Brother," who dominates the forces of nature.

The Opatas inhabited regions in the center and northwest of the state. This group name means "hostile people" and was given to them by the Pimas, as the Opatas were generally in conflict with their neighbors. They were especially hostile to the Tohono O'odham, who they depreciatingly refer to as the Papawi O'otham, or "bean people."

The Pimas occupy the mountains of the Sierra Madre Occidental in eastern Sonora and western Chihuahua state. The Pimas call themselves the O'oh, which means "the people." The name Pima was given to them by Spaniards because the word "pima" would be said in response to most questions asked to them in Spanish. This word roughly means "I don't know" or "I don't understand." The traditional territory of this ethnicity is known as the Pimería, and it is divided into two regions: the Pimería Alta and the Pimería Baja.

The Guarijíos are one of the least understood groups in the state, and are mostly restricted to an area called the Mesa del Matapaco in the southeast. The Guarijíos are related to the Tarahumaras and the Cáhitas.

The Cocopah is the smallest native indigenous group to Sonora with only about 170 members, who live mostly in San Luis Río Colorado, along the U.S. border. Their original name Kuapak, means "which comes" and possibly refers to the frequent changes in the course of the Colorado River. There have been efforts to preserve what is left of the Cocopah culture, but only 47 individuals speak the Cocopah language.

The Kickapoos are not native to Sonora, but migrated here from the United States over a century ago. Today, they are found in the communities of El Nacimiento, Coahuila and Tamichopa in the municipality of Bacerac. Their ancestral language was part of the Algonquin family.

The Anasazi culture flourished in the region currently known as the Four Corners. The territory was covered by juniper forests which the ancient peoples learned to exploit for their own needs. The Anasazi society is one of the most complex to be found in Oasisamerica, and they are assumed to be the ancestors of the modern Pueblo people (including the Zuñi and Hopi). (The word "Anasazi" is a Navajo term meaning "enemy ancestors"; its neutrality should thus not be blindly assumed.) In contrast to their Anasazi neighbors to the north, the nomadic communities of the Hohokam culture are poorly understood. They occupied the desert-like lands of Arizona and Sonora. The Hohokam territory is bounded by two large rivers, the Colorado and Gila Rivers, that outline the heart of the Sonora Desert. The principal settlements of the Hohokam culture were Snaketown, Casa Grande, Red Mountain, and Pueblo de los Muertos, all of which are to be found in modern-day Arizona. A slightly different branch of the Hohokam people is known as the Trincheras, named after their most well-known site in the Sonora Desert. The Hohokam lived in small communities of several hundred people.

The development of the Hohokam culture is divided into four periods: Pioneer (300 BCE - 550 CE), Colonial (550-900 CE), Sedentary (900-1100 CE), and Classical (1100-1450 CE). The Pioneer period commenced with the construction of the canal works, and the Hohokam constructed semi subterranean dwellings in order to protect themselves from the blistering heat of the Sonoran Desert. In the Colonial period, ties were strengthened with Mesoamerica. Proof of this can be found in the recovery of copper bells, pyrite mirrors, and the construction of ballgame courts juego de pelota, all of which display a very Hohokam touch. The relations with Mesoamerica and the presence of such traded goods indicate that by the Colonial period the Hohokam had already become organized into chiefdoms and centers of power. Relations with Mesoamerica would diminish in the following period, and the Hohokam turned to construct multi-story buildings like Casa Grande, which had four levels.

By the time the Europeans arrived in the Arizona and Sonora Deserts, a region which they named Pimería Alta, the urban centers of the Hohokam had already become abandoned presumably due to the health and ecological disasters that befell the indigenous social system. The inhabitants of the region were called Pápagos, a group which spoke an Uto-Aztecan language.

The Mogollon was a cultural area of Mesoamerica that extended from the foothills of the Sierra Madre Occidental, northward to Arizona and New Mexico in the southwestern United States. Some scholars prefer to distinguish between two broad cultural traditions in this area: the Mogollon itself and the Paquime culture that were derived from it. Either way, the peoples who inhabited the area in question adapted well to a landscape that was marked by the presence of pine forests and steep mountains and ravines.

=== The Region ===
The region has been widely studied by archeologists, anthropologists and historians, who have worked on ruins and fossilized bones. However, much of the research in this area is still in its initial descriptive stage with many basic questions still unanswered. As previously noted Sonora is considered to be a cultural zone separate from Mesoamerica, although there may have been some Mesoamerican influence. The major differences between Sonoran cultures and Mesoamerica include dry climate farming, although the same basics of corn, squash and beans are produced. There is also a heavier reliance on wild resources. More important was the lack of true cities during this area's prehispanic history, with small settlements clustered around water sources and weak hierarchical systems. These cultures share some traits with those of the U.S. Southwest, however distinct.

The Cerro de Trincheras is an archeological site, with petroglyphs, plazas and astronomical observatories. The exact purpose of the area has been disputed, but the area reached its height between 1300 and 1450 CE, when it had population of about 1,000, which made its living growing corn, squash, cotton and agave. Its largest structure is called "La Cancha" (The Ballcourt), which is at the base of the north side of the hill. It is a rectangular patio marked by rocks piled on its edges, measuring 51 by 13 metres (167 by 43 ft). Some researchers believe it was some kind of ball court and others believe it was a kind of open air theater. On the hill itself is an observatory, which gives views of the area. Most of the area's artifacts of stone and shell were found here. The Plaza de Caracol is marked by a meter and a half high stone wall in an open spiral, most likely used for ceremonies.

== The site ==
La Pintada comprises two different archaeological components; within the Canyon are cave paintings and rock engravings, while outside, on the alluvial plain of the Canyon are vestiges of various seasonal camping grounds in an extensive area, characterized by a concentration of archaeological material: ceramic, stone tools, sea shells and grinding artifacts.

=== Camping Grounds ===
Most of the archaeological materials found in these grounds, are within the archaeological tradition known as Central Coast, and are particularly similar to those found by Edward Mosler and Thomas Bowen at sites in the region of Tastiota and Punta San Antonio in the southern part of the Central Coast area. So far, La Pintada is the site associated with that archaeological tradition farther away from the coastline.

Occupation of the camping grounds reached its peak between 700 and 1600 CE, judging from the abundance of ceramic smooth shark type; the presence of this ceramic as well other corresponding to historical and modern Seri types shows a cultural continuity which allows to infer the presence of Central Coast tradition groups as well as historical seris or concaác, without implying that they were the only inhabitants of the place or the cave painting component being their exclusive art work.

=== Cave Paintings ===
The place is considered a ceremonial center, and one of the most important cave painting areas in the northwest of the country. There are no buildings or structures.

The Sonora and La Pintada archaeological wealth are characterized basically by the painting designs, and archaeological vestiges related to occasional settlements. The paintings depict over 400 different style or design types, that were drawn by different ethnical groups at different times, and was probably used as a ceremonial center.

It is believed to have been an open camping place, where people gathered as part of a collectors and hunters group circuit.

During 1960-1970 the first meticulous investigation work was made, since then there has been a few incidental works but not any more formal investigation.

The paintings are an artistic manifestation of what was around; describes the native view of the environment back then, their thought, as well as the way and forms of life.

The site was occupied by several groups in diverse times; in addition it was maintained as a sacred place, ceremonial and emblematic.

It is estimated that in the site there are over 2,500 of these graphical manifestations, of which around 70 percent has been digitally registered.

The paintings are distributed in a natural canyon as part of the Archaeological Zone. These designs are believed to be cosmo-vision representations of the ancient groups that occupied this area about 1,200 years ago, as well as during the Spanish invasion.

Since 2007, a group of technicians performs the meticulous analysis and digital registry of these ancient manifestations, distributed in 33 hectares. This work has provided knowledge of the fact that La Pintada was an important space for diverse human groups, as much for hunting-collector groups that inhabited it during the 12th and 13th centuries, as well as for native seris, yaquis and pimas that probably used it as a ritual center between the 17th and 18th centuries.

The rock represented images; made 1,200 years ago, represent local fauna such as deer, reptiles and birds, depicted by the first hunting-collector groups, when shaping them in stone, possibly as part of ancient rituals.

La Pintada Archaeological Zone emblematic representation is the painting called "the deer", it is one of the largest of the site, measuring 1 by 1.20 meters high, in which a native boy mounting a deer is depicted, and this scene matches the seri myth of the powerful boy.

== La Pintada Friends ==
There are independent voices interested, although are not absolutely in agreement with available information.

Héctor Domínguez, president of the Association "Amigos de la Pintada", indicated that the resource talked about for site restoration, 1.5 million is insufficient. He talked about what has been done and of what remains to be done, for the sake of the patrimony.

The idea to integrate the Association was made on March 21, 2000. Formed by friends of ecology, meditation and nature contact, willing to work a little bit "more consciously".

INAH believes that the work has been affected by political problems, reflected by two very abrupt director changes, it is difficult to consider that a director confronts power struggle situations, that "are embarrassing"; apparently caused by a highway location disagreements.

== See also ==
- Anasazi
- Aridoamerica
- History of Mesoamerica (Paleo-Indian)
- Hohokam
- La Proveedora
- Mesoamerica
- Mogollon
- Oasisamerica
- Paleo-Indians
- Pima
- Prehistoric Southwestern cultural divisions
- Seri
- Yaqui
