= Guarijio =

Guarijio, Huarijio, Warihío, Varihío or Varohío may refer to:

- Guarijio people, an ethnic group of Mexico
- Huarijio language, a Uto-Aztecan language of Mexico
