= Huásabas =

City in Sonora, Mexico

Coordinates: 29°54′N 109°18′W

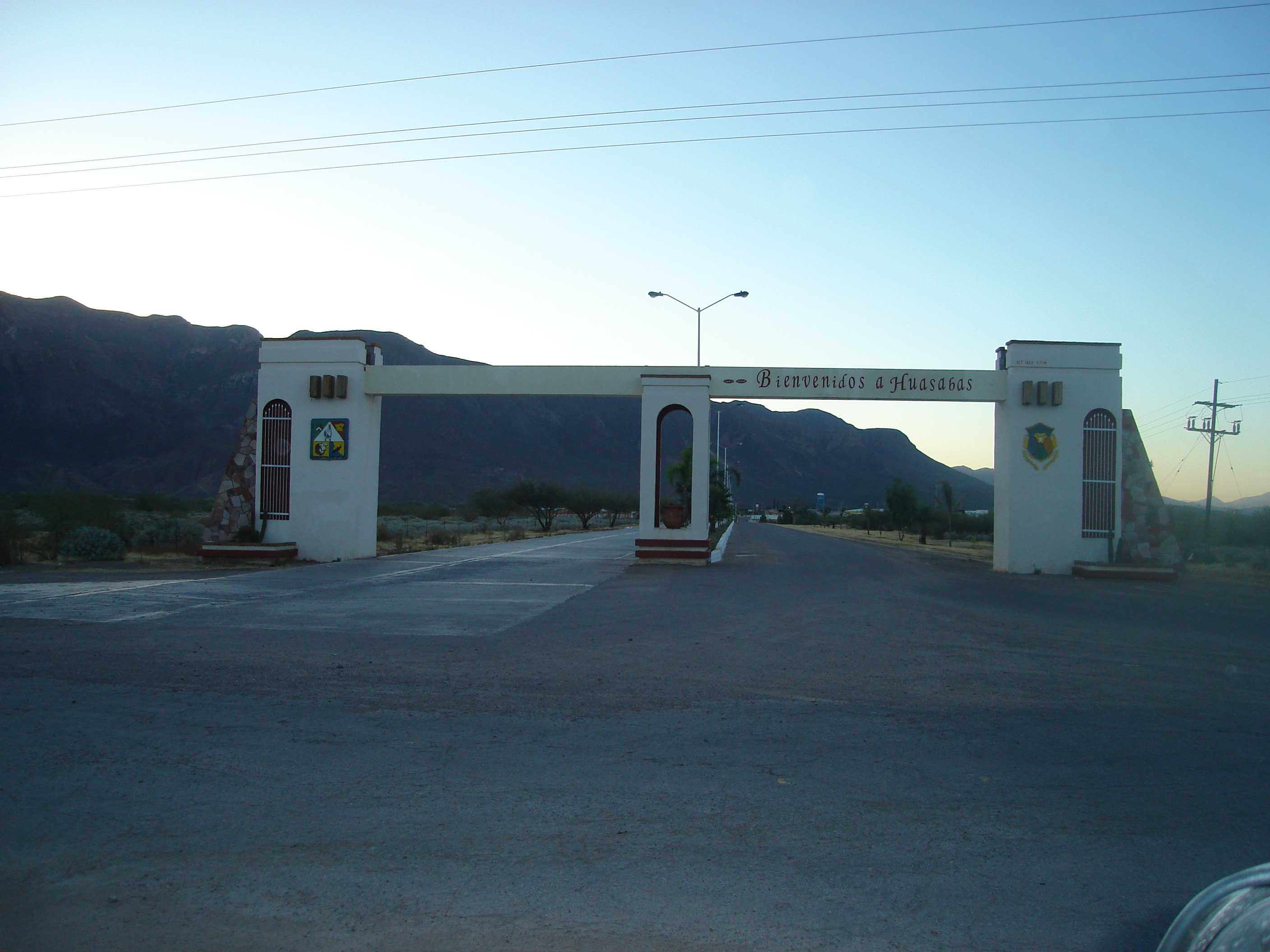
Huasabass entrance

Huásabas is the municipal seat of Huásabas Municipality in the northeast of the Mexican state of Sonora. The municipal area is 711.17 km² (274.58 mi²) with a population of 966 registered in 2000. Most of the inhabitants live in the municipal seat.

Huásabas is connected to Moctezuma by a paved road; the distance being 47 km. The state capital, Hermosillo, lies at a distance of 215 km.

It was founded in 1645 by the Jesuit missionary Marcos del Río, with the name of San Francisco de Huásaca. The land was occupied at the time by the Ópata Indians. In the Ópata language, Huásaca has two meanings: place of grassy lands or place of lands full of trash carried by the river.

The land is mountainous and the main settlement lies at an elevation of 850 meters (2,790 ft). The average annual temperature is 20.3 °C (68.5 °F) and the average annual rainfall is 490.8 mm (19.32 in).

The region is crossed by the Río Bavispe, which is a tributary of the Río Yaqui.

Agriculture and cattle raising are the two main economic activities. Corn and beans are raised for subsistence while grasses are grown for cattle fodder. The cattle herd was 10,120 head in 2000. The economically active population in 2000 was only 347 workers in 2000. Important communities from Huásabas now live in Hermosillo, the capital city of Sonora, Tucson, Arizona and Santa Ana, California. Still, they maintain strong ties to "El Pueblo" (the Town) and most of them come back once or twice a year, since both cities (Tucson and Hermosillo) are located at a distance no longer than a four-hour drive, however, Santa Ana, California is a 12-14 hour drive.

Special celebrations take place on August 15, when the "Fiesta Patronal" occurs to commemorate the Assumption of Mary, the patron saint of Huásabas, including dances in the main square, rodeos, horse races, and music bands on the streets. Holy Week is extensively celebrated with solemn Catholic rites and a vivid performance of the Via Crucis on Good Friday.

In Huásabas cowboy culture is historically and profoundly rooted, which can still be observed in men's clothing, specially the extensive use of Texan style hats (sombreros) and boots, rodeos (jaripeos), and the extended usage of horse riding among cattle tenders.
