= Corima (restaurant) =

Restaurant in New York City

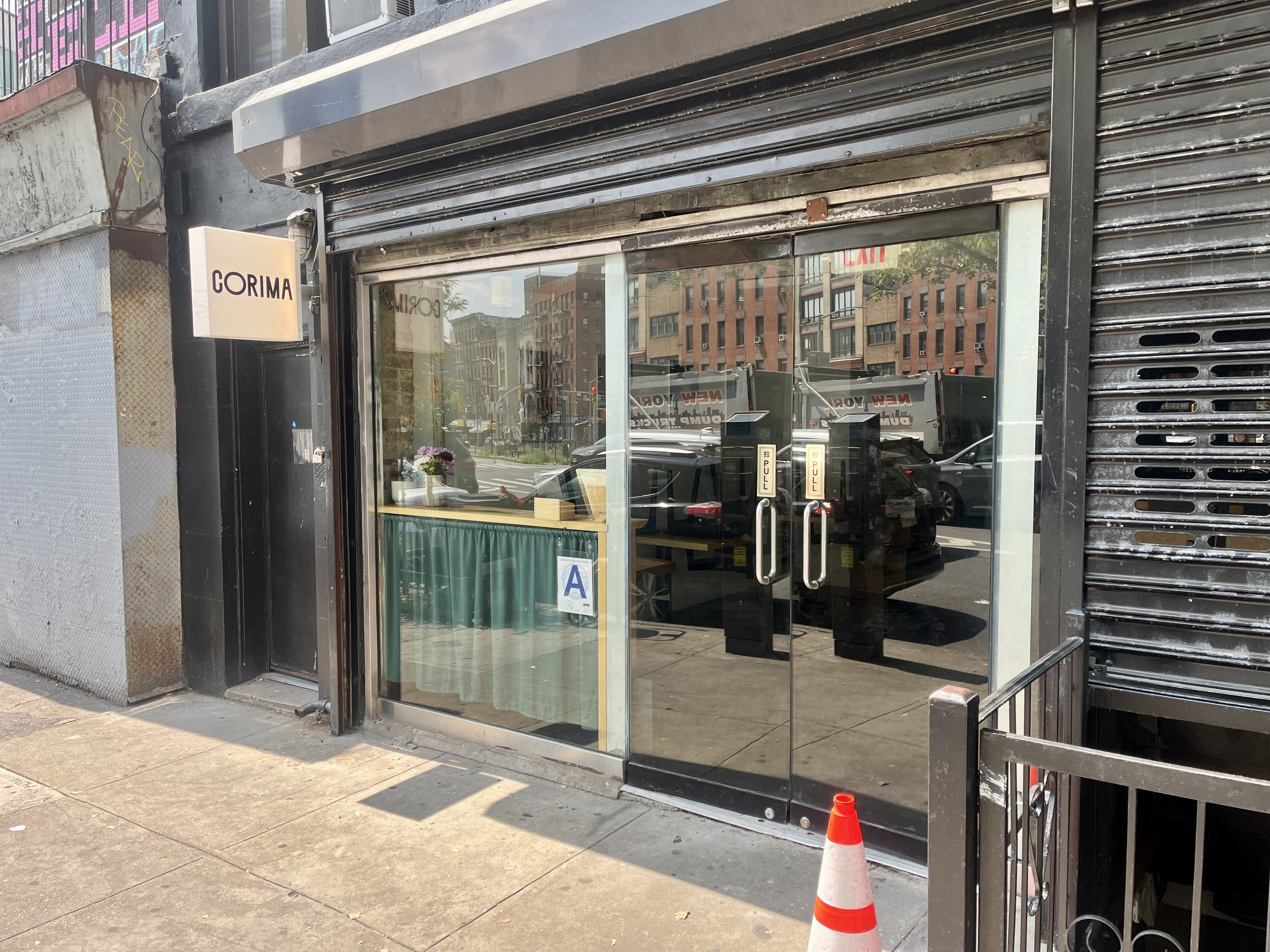
- The restaurant's exterior in 2024
- Interactive map of Corima

Restaurant information
- Established: January 12, 2024
- Head chef: Fidel Caballero
- Food type: Mexican
- Rating: 2024-Present
- Location: 3 Allen Street, New York City, New York, 10002, United States
- Coordinates: 40°42′53″N 73°59′35″W
- Seating capacity: 28
- Reservations: Recommended
- Website: corimanyc.com

Corima, or lit.'circle of giving' in Tarahumara, is a Michelin-starred restaurant in New York City, on the border between the Lower East Side and Chinatown serving northern Mexican cuisine.

== Description ==
The seasonal menu includes smoked swordfish tamal, potato udon noodles with cornhusk dashi, and chocolate flan. The head chef, Fidel Caballero, used to work at Contra. Options include a la carte and a tasting menu consisting of 10-13 courses.

== Accolades ==
The restaurant immediately gained a single Michelin star and has held once since then. It was named of the twenty best new restaurants of 2024 by Bon Appétit. It was also ranked 36 on the 2025 edition of the The World's 50 Best Restaurants's North America list.

== See also ==
- List of Michelin-starred restaurants in New York City
