= La Pintada =

La Pintada may refer to:

- La Pintada, Colombia
- La Pintada, Panama
- La Pintada (archaeological site) in Sonora, Mexico
