= Taracahitic languages =

Putative branch of the Uto-Aztecan language family in Mexico

Taracahitic
- Cahita-Opata-Tarahuma
- (putative)
- Native speakers: c. 152,000 (2020)
- Linguistic classification: Uto-Aztecan: Taracahitic
- Subdivisions: Tarahumaran; Tubar †; Cahitan; ?Opatan †; ?Concho †

Language codes
- Glottolog: None
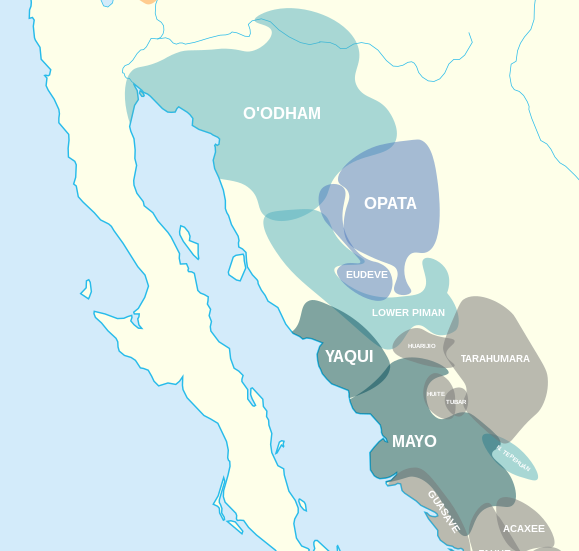

The Taracahitic languages (occasionally called Taracahita or Taracahitan) form a putative branch of the Uto-Aztecan language family of Mexico. The best known is Tarahumara.

== Languages ==
- Tarahumaran

Tarahumara
Guarijío (Huarijio, Varihio)

?Chínipa †
?Guasapar †
?Témori †

- Tubar †
- Cahita

Yaqui
Mayo
?Acaxee †

- ?Ópata † (Eudeve, Heve, Dohema)
- ?Tahue †
- ?Jova † (see Ópata)
