= Opata people =

Ethnic group in Mexico

Opata
Total population
- Unknown

Regions with significant populations
- Mexico (Sonora)

Languages
- Spanish, formerly Opata

Religion
- Roman Catholicism

The Opata (Spanish: Ópata, /ˈopata/) are an Indigenous people in Mexico. Opata territory, the "Opatería" in Spanish, encompasses the mountainous northeast and central part of the state of Sonora, extending to near the border with the United States. Historically, they included several subtribes, including the Eudeve, Teguima, and Jova peoples.

Most Opatan towns were situated in river valleys and had an economy based on irrigated agriculture. They spoke the Opata language, a Uto-Aztecan language, that is now extinct.

In the 16th century, at the time of Spanish contact, the Opata were the most numerous people in Sonora.

Some sources indicate that as an identifiable ethnic group, the Opata are now extinct, or nearly extinct. In the early 20th century, "remnants of the Opatas [were] found principally along San Miguel river" and further west. From the 1970s to the present, some people continue to identify as Opatas and as descendants of the Opatas.

== Language ==
The Opata language was a Uto-Aztecan language, related to neighboring languages such as O'odham, Tarahumara, Tepehuan, Yaqui and Mayo, among others.

The Eudeve dialect is called Dohema. The Tehuimas spoke Tehuima, and the Jovas spoke Jova. The Eudeve and Tehuima languages were closely related, as "different as Portuguese and Spanish." Jova was a more distinct language.

The Ópata language, with the possible exception of the Jova dialect, were extinct by 1950. During the 1993 census in Mexico, 12 persons claimed to be "Opata" speakers, but this is widely considered to be an error in the census count.

Professor Manuel García Madrid, an Opata from Sonora, has published a linguistic text on the Tehuima dialect. American linguistic anthropologist David L. Shaul has done extensive research and published much material on the Eudeve dialect. Field anthropologist Campbell Pennington researched and published much information on the Opatan peoples and their dialects during the latter part of their history.

== Name ==
As the three Opatan groups lived adjacent to one another, Franciscan missionaries had by about 1800 lumped them together into one group they called "Opata." Several Franciscan missionary records and subsequent anthropological accounts state that "Opata" was borrowed from a Pima Indian word meaning "enemy," the name allegedly given by the northern and southern Piman peoples to their Opatan neighbors. However, according to Opatan oral traditionalists, "Opata" is the name some Tehuima villages gave to themselves and means "iron people," since iron ore was abundant in Opata territory, and Opata spear tips were made from iron ore. Thus, those Tehuima people were also known as "the iron spear people." Some anthropological texts state that the "Opata" referred to themselves collectively in their own language as "Joylraua." However, according to Opata oral traditionalists, Joylraua was the name of an ancient Eudeve village named after an honored chieftain of that village.

== History ==
=== 16th century ===
In the 16th century, Ópata may have entered Pima territory what is now Sonora from the northeast. At the time of first contact with the Spanish in the mid-16th century, the Opatería was a land of "statelets," a number of independent, agricultural towns scattered up and down the inland valleys of the Sonora River (statelets: Corazones, Señora, and Guaraspi), Moctezuma River (statelets: Cumupa, Batuco, and Pinebaroca), Bavispe River (statelet: Sahuaripa), and Aros River (statelets: Paibatubo, and Oera). There were at least five Opata statelets, and four others which were either Opata, Pima, or mixed. The statelets had populations of several thousand people, and consisted of towns surrounded by dispersed dwellings and irrigated cropland. The Opata grew corn, squash, beans, and cotton. The Jova, however, were a more dispersed people, living in more rugged terrain, and depended more on hunting and gathering than the other Opata groups.

The Opatas traded with other Indian nations (Concho, Zuni) to purchase turquoise in exchange for corn and cotton blankets. Animal skins and roots were acquired through trade with the Jano, Suma (mixed with Apache), Jumano (probably mixed with Apache and Comanche), Jocome, and Manso. Other items were traded with Yaqui, Mayo, and Seri, with whom they shared some fishing and hunting areas.

=== 17th and 18th centuries ===
Sisibotari ("The Great Lord") was a respected Jova chieftain known throughout Opata country who lived from the late 16th century to the mid-17th century. He served as a major intermediary between the Opatan peoples and the Spanish, which helped maintain peace between the two peoples during his time. Father Andrés Pérez de Ribas described Sisibotari, "He was handsome and still young, wore a long coat attached at his shoulder like a cape, and his loins were covered with a cloth, as was the custom of that nation. On the wrist of his left hand, which holds the bow when the hand pulls the cord to send the arrow, he wore a very becoming marten skin".

The Opata fiercely resisted the expedition of Spanish explorer Francisco Ibarra in 1565. For several decades, the Spanish made no further attempts to conquer the Opatería. However, during that period, the statelets declined and were replaced by a "ranchería" culture of small settlements and dispersed dwellings. The drastic decline of the Ópata population is likely due to epidemics of introduced European diseases and local diseases.

In 1628, Jesuit missionaries established a mission in Opatería and encountered little opposition to their efforts to evangelize, and later, to reorganize Opata society along Spanish lines. Pedro Mendéz led the effort to convert Ópatas to Roman Catholicism. The Opata slowly became Spanish allies of convenience. Opata soldiers joined the Spanish in campaigns against their common enemy the Apache.

By 1688, the Spanish established 22 missions among the Ópata. The Ópata assimilated into Spanish society, far more than the Tarahumara, Mayo, or Yaqui did.

=== 19th century ===
By 1800, the Opata were mostly followers of Christianity, commonly spoke Spanish, and were largely under the rule of the Spanish government. Many Opatans became cowboys on Spanish ranches, or migrated to mining towns to work in the mines.

Tension between the Spanish, the Mexicans, and the Opata manifested itself in numerous revolts in the 19th century. In 1820, 300 Opata warriors defeated a Spanish force of 1,000 soldiers and destroyed a mining town near Tonichi. Later, they won another battle at Arivechi, killing more than 30 soldiers. A Spanish force of 2,000 soldiers finally defeated the Opata, forcing the survivors to surrender. The Spanish executed the Opata leaders, including Dorame, a Eudeve, whose surname is still common in the Opatería region of Sonora. Revolts continued after Mexico gained its independence from Spain in 1821. Another Opata leader, Dolores Gutiérrez, was executed in 1833 by the Mexicans for his involvement in a revolt. Although the Opata had formidable reputations as warriors, they were never able to unite as a single people to oppose the Spanish and Mexicans.

Fierce battles with the Apache took a heavy toll on the Opata.

Most of the Opata supported the French during their brief rule of Mexico from 1864 to 1867, as did most Sonoran Indians. An Opata, Refugio Tanori, became a general in the military forces supporting the Imperial rule of Maximilian I. When Tanori's forces were defeated, he fled to Guaymas, and boarded a ship headed for Baja California. Before the ship reached the peninsula, it was stopped by Republican forces. Tanori was captured and executed. The retribution of the Mexicans against the Opata after the defeat of the French occupation resulted in the loss of nearly all of their remaining lands and the end of their resistance to Mexican rule.

=== 20th century ===
In 1902, American anthropologist Ales Hrdlicka, estimated the number of "pure-blooded individuals" among the Opatas at 500 to 600. Another anthropologist, Carl Lumholtz, commented that the Opatas had "lost their language, religion, and traditions, dress like the Mexicans, and in appearance are in no way distinguishable from the laboring class of Mexico with which they are thoroughly merged through frequent intermarriage."

=== 21st century ===
In the 21st century, Arizona and Sonora residents identifying as Opata, among other Mexican Indigenous communities, began seeking recognition. In 2014, an Opata man, Roy Cook, and founder of the California Indian Education site was named an American Indian Heritage Month Local Hero by KPBS. In 2018, the town of Bacanora, whose name's etymology is derived from the Opata language, promoted the continuation of traditional Opata cultivation and processing of agave for regional liquor.

== Population ==
Population estimates for Opatería at the time of Spanish contact range from 20,000 to 70,000, with most estimates nearer the higher figure. The Opatas were the most numerous of the several Indigenous groups in the state of Sonora, and the river valleys of their territory were densely populated with their permanent villages. Disease, war, and famine reduced the aboriginal population of Opatería to 6,000 by 1764. Today, there are no known full-blooded Opatas left, but mestizo descendants still make up the majority population of traditional Opata territory. In 1959, "the San Miguel Valley can be pointed out as one of the major areas of Opata survival, probably having an Indian population of at least 15 percent." Many Opata descendants reside in other parts of Sonora, greater Mexico, and the southwestern United States, particularly in Arizona, where their ancestors migrated to work in agriculture and mining.

== Culture ==
=== Settlement pattern and livelihood ===
At the time of first contact with the Spanish, the Opata may have been the most numerous and culturally complex people living in Oasis America, comprising the desert regions of northern Mexico and the southwestern United States. The Opata were among the peoples inhabiting the Primería Alta.

The towns of the Opata were found in the broad valleys of the five north–south trending rivers of northern and eastern Sonora. The rivers, west to east, are the San Miguel, Sonora, Moctezuma, and the two upper tributaries of the Yaqui, the Bavispe and the Arcos. The Opata were not members of a single political entity, but rather organized into a number of "statelets" – several of which may have also been populated by their neighbors to the south, the Pima Bajo. The statelets were characterized by a ruling class, slavery, irrigation agriculture, and emphasis on trade. They featured a central town, functioning as the seat of government, of at least 200 two and three-story adobe houses and a population of six per house or 1,200 or more. In the countryside for several miles in every direction from the central town were satellite communities: hamlets of 9 to 25 houses and "rancherías" of less than 9 houses.

The Opata depended upon agriculture for much of their subsistence. Maize, beans, squash, and cotton were the principal crops. Due to the scarcity and irregularity of rainfall, the Opata practiced canal irrigation as well as dry-land farming techniques. Early Spanish explorers described large and productive fields among the Opata. The Opata also hunted game, especially deer, with bows and arrows, fished in the rivers with spears and nets, and gathered wild foods such as Chenopodium and cactus leaves and fruits. They also produced a fermented maize atole beverage known as tanori, which was normally drunk during certain ceremonies and celebrations. Expert preparers of that beverage often took on the second name of Tanori.

The statelet era of Opata history endured from 1350 to 1550. With decreasing population due to European diseases, Opatan societies in the 17th century became smaller and less complex.

=== Attire and architecture ===
Opata women were skilled weavers and wove dyed and full-length colorful cotton fiber dresses. Men generally dressed more scantily in skirts made of hide, but also wore serapes (shawls) in cold weather. Footwear consisted of sandals made from hide. Women often wore only hide skirts similar to those of men during warm weather, and both sexes often went about nude during the hot season. Necklaces and other adornments made from hide, stone, bone, shell, and feathers were worn.

Dwellings consisted of thatched huts and small houses made of adobe and zacate with thatched roofs. During warm, dry seasons, semi-subterranean dwellings known as a hu'uki were also used. (In addition, hu'ukis were used as sweat lodges, and small ones were constructed for the purpose of storing legumes to keep them cool and fresh longer).

=== Sexual mores and family planning ===
Homosexuality and transgenderism were not taboo in traditional Opatan society. Same-sex couples existed in some villages, including effeminate males who dressed and lived as women. There were plural marriages of village leaders where they took their sisters-in-law as spouses or concubines.

Fertility rites also took place. Described as "obscene" in Spanish priests' written accounts (see, for example Cañas, 1730), a commonly reported fertility rite was a round dance known as the "Mariachi."

== Subgroups ==
At the time of the first contact with the Spanish in the 16th century, there were multiple sub-groups of Opata people. However, by the mid-17th century, the Spanish identified only three Opatan groups.

The largest was the Eudeve, whose ancient villages and current towns encompass the western portions of traditional Opata territory. The Eudeve also referred to themselves as Deve. Both names mean "people" in their language.

The second largest group was first known as the Ore, but were later called the Tegüima or Tehuima (teh-wee-mah). Their ancient villages and current towns encompass the northeastern and central portion of Opata territory. Tehuima means "river people."

The smallest Opatan group was the Ova or Jova (ho-vah). Jova means "water people." They originally inhabited eight villages in the southeastern portion of Opata territory. Some of their villages were Negarachi, Sahuaripa, Teopari, Tutuaca, Xiripa, and Yepomera. A number of the Jova lived in Chihuahua. These people were still independent, and not under Spanish rule, as late as 1678.

During the 18th century, the Jova intermarried with neighboring Eudeves and they merged into one single group. At that point the Jova no longer could be identified as a distinct Indigenous ethnic group.

According to the "Noticias Estadisticas del Estado de Sonora" by D. Francisco Velasco the Opata Nation is subdued in:

- Opatas Tegüis, towns: Opodepe, Terapa, Cucurpe, Álamos, Batuco.
- Opatas Tegüimas, towns: Sinoquipe, Banamichi, Huepaca, Aconchi, Babiacora, Chinapa, Bacuachi, Cuquiarachi, Cumpas.
- Opatas Caüinachis, towns: Toniche, Matape, Oputo, Oposura, Guasavas, Bacadeguachi, Nacori (otro), Mochopa.
- Opatas Eudeves, towns (including other Opatas): Matape, Nacori, Los Alamos, Ranchería Robesco, Bacanora, Batuco, Tepuspe, Cucurpe, Saracatzi, Toape, Opodepe.
- Opatas Jovas, towns (including other Opatas) and extending to Chihuahua: San José Teopari, Los Dolores, Sahuaripa, Pónida, Santo Tomas, Arivetzi, San Mateo Malzura.

== Descendants ==
Some people in Sonora and southern Arizona identify as being of Ópata descent today. Very few Ópata traditions are exercised today, and their character is generally mestizaje (mainline Mexican mestizo) as opposed to a traditional Indigenous character and lifestyle.

However, the ancient Opatan spring procession rite known today as the fariseo (with some Catholicism mixed in) is still exercised during Easter week in most towns and villages in Opata Country. The rite includes the wearing of masks and the use of traditional Opatan instruments during the procession which include hand-held gourd rattles, bands of small ankle rattles, and hand-held drums. Masks often include traditional ones carved from Cottonwood, depicting various painted human and animal-like facial figures.

== See also ==
- Spanish missions in the Sonoran Desert
- Kathleen Alcalá, Mexican/Jewish-American author who identifies as having Ópata ancestry and writes about Ópata subjects
