= Cáhita =

Cahíta
Total population
- 40,000

Regions with significant populations
- Mexico (Sonora, Sinaloa)

Languages
- Cahita (Yaqui, Mayo)

Related ethnic groups
- Mayo people, Yaqui people,

Cáhita or Cahíta is an umbrella term for several Indigenous peoples of Mexico in the West Coast states of Sonora and Sinaloa. The term includes the Yaqui, Mayo, and Tehueco peoples. Early Jesuit missionaries kept detailed documentation about these people in the colonial era.

The Cáhita numbered approximately 40,000 in the 20th century.

== Origin ==
An early 17th-century Jesuit first recorded the term Cáhita, which referred to the Hiaki, Mayo, and Tehueco. Mid-19th-century Mexican scholars broaden the term Cáhita to refer to more peoples of the region.

== Historical culture ==
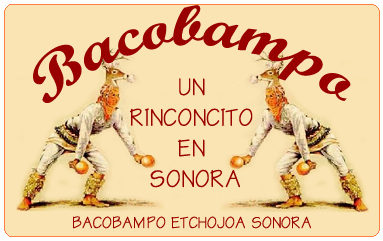
Graphic featuring images of Cáhita dancers

The Cahita were semi-nomadic, not having a fixed permanent settlement but moving throughout a region defended as their own. Despite common cultural elements, the Spanish divided them into subgroups based on their spoken language and area inhabited. The language belonged to the Uto-Aztec family, but the variety in dialects allowed the Jesuits to distinguish nations, designating indigenous groups by language. The Jesuits identified five main nations within the Cahitas, considered the most important due to the large number of families forming them: Sinaloa, Ocoroni, Zuaque, Mayo and the Yaqui. The first three had their territories in the valleys of the Sinaloa and Fuerte Rivers; The Mayo and the Yaqui occupied territory in the valleys of the rivers that today bear their names; the Yaqui and Mayo, whose channels span across the state of Sonora.

Some of the Cahita peoples that existed in the state of Sinaloa were the Sinaloas, Bamoas, Ahomes, Ocoronis, Bacoregüis, Comoporis, Basopas, Níos, Comanitos, Bacubiritos, Terabuitos, Batacaris (or Batucaris), Tehuecos, Zuaques, Zoes (or Tzoes), Huites, Yecoratos and Oguiras.

== Territory ==
The Cahita are part of the cultural and geographical area of Aridoamerica. They share some similarities with Mesoamerican peoples. They have long been agrarian and grow corn, beans, squash, and chili. Their historical territory extended from the Mocorito River in the south to the Yaqui River in the north, the Sierra Madre Occidental Mountain range to the east and the Pacific coast in the west. They were demographically distributed between five rivers: Mocorito, Sinaloa, Fuerte, Mayo and Yaqui, but did not establish strong ties with each other. Each community lived freely, forming their regions through natural movement.

== Language ==
Mayo Cahita woman and child.

Mayo Cahita man.

A large and developed population, such as the Nahuas, were able to exert their influence through contact with groups and tribes in the region. According to the testimony of missionaries, evangelizing in the province of Sinaloa, between the Mocorito River and the Yaqui River existed a large number of different languages. However, the primary language spoken was Cahita.

In 1593, there were three languages on the Mocorito River, six on the Sinaloa River, one with two dialects on the Mayo River, one with a dialect on the Fuerto River, and another on the Yaqui River. Over the passage of time, these languages disappeared until the use of Cahita was universal between the Sinaloa and Yaqui Rivers.

Their languages, the Yaqui and Mayo languages, form the Cáhitan branch of the Uto-Aztecan language family. They are agglutinative languages, where words use suffix complexes for a variety of purposes, with several morphemes strung together. The Cáhita population and language was drastically reduced by Spanish explorers during colonial times.

== Economy ==
Their economy was based on subsistence agriculture along banks of rivers. In order to cultivate crops they used a long planting stick or cane, more than a meter long, to create a small hole in order to plant seeds. As the river seasonally grew, the lands flooded, and the indigenous people would wait for the plants to grow and fruit to ripen in order to harvest them. They enjoyed around two harvests a year, corresponding with the twice annual flooding of the rivers. They planted corn, pumpkin, chili, and beans. They did not tend to store their harvest, and so if any produce was lost, they had to resort to hunting and gathering to sustain themselves.

Their nomadic lifestyle and constant moving along rivers are explained by their agricultural economy, necessitating them to search for riverbanks favorable for planting, then move on once the resources of an area were exhausted.

== Political and social organizing ==
The Cahita were a kinship-based society, organized together in groups of families. They had a basic social organization, and did not recognize any individual authority beside a military leader in times of war. The majority of the indigenous people were monogamous, although polygamy was allowed and divorce was socially acceptable and occurred frequently.

== Military ==
A very marked cultural trait of the Cahita was their belligerence. This trait distinguishes them from the other groups in the region, such as the Tahues and the Totorames. Their main armaments were arrows, the bow, and the club. Arrows were made with a sharp point hardened by fire and coated in poison. It was customary to enter battle yelling, as well as painting their bodies and faces and wearing adornments of feathers. They used military tactics such as hidden traps placed in the paths of enemies, and often used surprise raids at dawn.

Entering into battle was a decision made by adult males. Because of this, they gathered the population and consulted the elders and experienced warriors. They smoked tobacco, danced, drank spirits, and listened to arguments for and against war. The main purpose of engaging in war was to regain territory occupied by other tribes, or to redress a grievance. After triumph in a battle, they celebrated the victory by ritually consuming the body of an enemy; as such, they chose whoever had distinguished themselves in battle to do this.

== Religion ==
The Cahita people worshipped natural forces such as the wind, the water, the earth, the sun, and the sea, to whom they provided offerings to ask for good harvests, abundant fishing, or a fruitful harvest. They believed in the existence of something superior to all the forces, who was responsible for all of creation. Their ceremonies were simple and without ritual. Special attention was paid to healers, who administered medicine to the sick and had special knowledge of herbal medicine. Their therapeutic practices were heavily religious, leading to the Jesuits referring to healers as 'sorcerers' and political leaders due to their high prestige within the group.

== Lifestyle ==
They lived in houses made of sticks, mud, and palm, similar to that of the Tahues, built away from the rising river and close to fields. The practical nature of their houses allowed them to move easily when circumstances required, as they had limited belongings and huts could be easily rebuilt after moving.

They were potters, manufacturing objects out of ceramic for daily and religious use. They created things for other uses such as whistles, and left space in the legs of their pots to insert small balls that made sound when shook. They practiced spinning and weaving cotton, which was a wild and abundant plant in the region. They wore woven blankets as clothing, although among men it was more common to go nude. Women tended to wear skirts made of cotton or suede.

The Cahita enjoyed ball games requiring strength and skill, which were common across Mesoamerica. They also played games of chance, betting belongings such as blankets, shell adornments, and skins.
