= Tarahumaran languages =

Language family

Tarahumaran
- (obsolete)
- Geographic distribution: western Mexico
- Linguistic classification: Uto-Aztecan: Southern; Tarahumaran
- Subdivisions: Tarahumara; Huarijio

Language codes
- Glottolog: tara1321

The Tarahumaran languages is a branch of the Uto-Aztecan language family that comprises the Tarahumara and Huarijio languages of Northern Mexico. The branch has been considered to be part of the Taracahitic languages, but this group is no longer considered a valid genetic unit.

== Languages ==
- Tarahumara
- Huarijio
  - ?Chínipa †
  - ?Guasapar †
  - ?Témori †
