= Coca language =

Extinct Uto-Aztecan language of Mexico

Coca
- Native to: Mexico
- Region: Jalisco
- Ethnicity: Coca people
- Extinct: (date missing)
- Language family: Uto-Aztecan: Southern; (Taracahitic); Coca

Language codes
- ISO 639-3: None (mis)
- Glottolog: coca1262

The Coca language is a poorly attested Uto-Aztecan language, ostensibly of the Taracahitic subgroup, formerly spoken in the Mexican state of Jalisco.

== Vocabulary ==
In the 1930s and 1940s, the historian José Ignacio Dávila Garibi compiled a number of lexical items in the Coca language from historical documents. Other Uto-Aztecan languages are included here for comparison.

gloss	Coca	Cahita	Yaqui	Cora	Western Peripheral Nahuatl
father, chief	tatachi	nachai	achai	nitáata	tahtli
mother, patroness, lady	nanachi	nae	ae, maala	naána	nāntzin
food	tachacate	buhuame	bwa'ame	cua'ira	tacualli/ihtacate
sugarcane	samná	sama	yoisana	huiini	oat
deer (sg/pl)	neari/nearin	maso	maaso	muasá/muasate	mazāt/mazāme
water	a/ac	bá	ba'am	jaj	āt/āl
river, stream	aque	háqui	jakia	achi/játa'ana	ātōyātl/ātōyātontli
to wash	tapaca	hipacsia	baksia, jipaksia	rajá'usiin	tapāca
to rest	següe	iumiore	kopana, yumjoe	rusa'upe	zēhuiā

Two Coca toponyms are recorded in the Relación Geográfica: Tapichinticahui (Juchitlán) and Tasnahui (Ocotlán).
