= Coca people =

Indigenous people of Mexico

The Coca people are an Indigenous people of Mexico who inhabit parts of the state of Jalisco, particularly around Lake Chapala, such as the small town of Mezcala in the municipality of Poncitlán. John R. Swanton considered the Coca to be a branch of the Caxcan alongside the Tecuexe and the Caxcan proper. The Coca language is now extinct and is poorly documented, but the most common hypothesis is that it belonged to the Uto-Aztecan family.

== History ==
Before colonization, the Cocas also lived in the vicinity of modern-day Guadalajara. When the Spanish invaded the territory of the Cocas, their leader Tzitlali moved them away to a small valley surrounded by high mountains, a place they named "Cocolan." One Coca deity was Tapachinti, the only goddess of western Mesoamerica associated with war.

Coca people live in an area known today as Cocula, Jalisco.

== Oral tradition ==
The ancestral group were the Concheros, who first settled in coves on the Pacific coast of Nayarit, and made houses out of sea shells. Their Gods were the ocean and the wind. They became known in the passing years as the shaft tomb culture, because of cylindrical tombs spread throughout Nayarit and Jalisco, spreading down the west side of Lake Chapala all the way to Colima.

They later centered themselves in Ixtlan del Rio, Nayarit, and created a round temple to their wind god, and other municipal buildings. Their obsidian trade was a source of wealth, as it was abundant there. (Ixtlan means obsidian). Eventually they were invaded by the Nahua people who were moving south from the land of the Yaquis on what is now the north Mexican border. The Nahuatl invaders imposed a Lordship over the inhabitants of Ixtlan del Rio in approximately 1100 to 1200 CE (current era). The Nahuatl Lords established an even wider obsidian trade, and tended to view the Coca people as servants (The Nahuatl word "coca" means servants.)

In 1310 a group of the Coca tribe were led by "Big Eyes" to a safer place in a valley with steep mountains by the largest lake in central highlands. Lake Chapala had a good wind and so many fish that they believed it had its own goddess, Michi Cihualli, sometimes used with the Nahuatl term "Teo" or Goddess, becoming "Teo Michi Cihualli" Woman or female goddess of the fish. The lake had many fish and good farmland. They called it Cuitzlan. They had no written language, so later in about 1525 when the Spanish came across the lake from the southern shore, the Spanish thought the Coca were calling this village on the north shore Cosala. It became known thereafter as es:San Juan Cosalá, since the Spanish missionaries converted them to Catholicism and gave them a saint's name. The Spanish also took some of their people 5 miles to the east to build a chapel in the even smaller fishing area now called Ajijic. Stories are told of how the Spanish also took some of the Coca tribe and much of the rock from the mountainside above them down to the west end of the lake, now known as Jocotepec, to build a chapel there also.

To this day the Coca people have a pueblo and a nearly circular 2-floor central gazebo with museum on first floor, similar to the architecture and city planning of Ixtlán del Río.

== Land dispute ==
In September 2018, Coca people hoped to recover their seized lands in Mezcala, the target of large-scale real estate projects for U.S. immigrants, resulting in many Indigenous lands being illegally seized, after 19 years struggling against a Guillermo Moreno Ibarra.

== See also ==
- Mezcala culture
- Mariachi
