= Tubar language =

Extinct Uto-Aztecan language of Mexico

Tubar
- Tubare
- Native to: Mexico
- Region: southern Chihuahua
- Extinct: 1940s–1970s
- Language family: Uto-Aztecan: Taracahitic?; Tubar

Language codes
- ISO 639-3: tbu
- Glottolog: tuba1279

Tubar or Tubare is an extinct language of southern Chihuahua, Mexico that belonged to the Uto-Aztecan language family.

== Morphology ==
Tubar is an agglutinative language, where words use suffix complexes for a variety of purposes with several morphemes strung together.

== Sample text ==
The following two samples are the Lord's Prayer in Tubar.

Ite cañar tegmue carichui catemat;
Imit tegmuarac milituraba teochigualac;
Imit huegmica cariniti bacachin-assisaguin
Imit avamunarir echu nañigualac imo cuigan
amo nachic tegmuecarichin.
Ite cokuatarit essemer taniguarit iabla ite micam;
Ite tatacoli ikiri atzomua ikirirain ite bacachin
cale kuegmua nañiguá cantem;
Caioa ite nosam baca tatacoli; bacachin
ackiró muetzerac ite.

The other version of the Lord's Prayer is slightly different from the first; it may be transcribed differently or be a different dialect.

Hite cañac temo calichin catema;
himite muhará huiturabá santoñetará;
himitemo acarí hay sesahui hitebacachin
hitaramaré hechinemolac amo cuira pan
amotemo calichin.
hitecocohatari éseme tan huaric llava hitemichin;
tatacoli higuíli hite nachi higuiriray hite bacachin
calquihuan nehun conten;
hitehohui catehue cheraca tatacoli; bacachin
hiquipo calquihuá ñahuité baquit ebacahin calaserac.

== Sources ==
- "Tubar Language and the Tubar Indian Tribe (Tubare, Tubares)". www.native-languages.org.
