= La Proveedora =

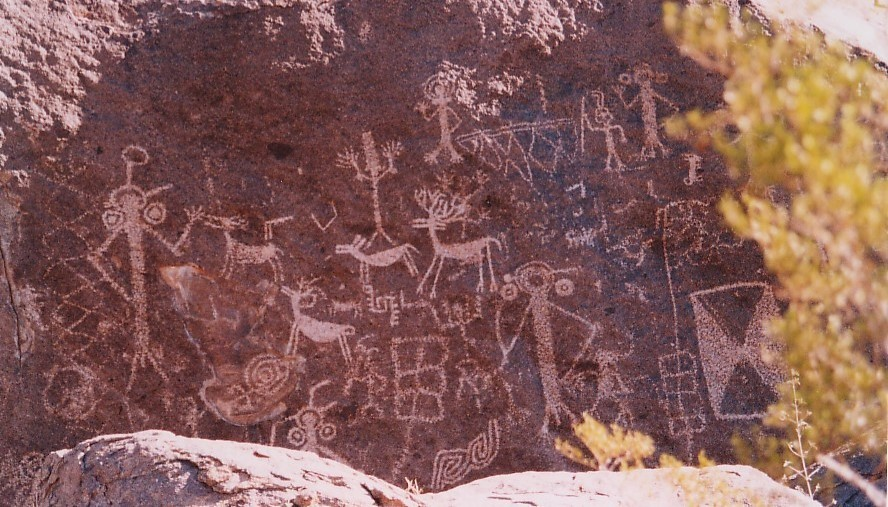
Rock art in Caborca, Mexico

La Proveedora is an archaeological site in Sonora, Mexico. It is located about 15 kilometres (9.3 mi) west of the city of Caborca, on the La Proveedora and San José hills within the Rancho Puerto Blanco Ejido, where most of these petroglyphs are located.

The site is a large concentration of petroglyphs, distributed across many hills of the area known as the “Proveedora”, an old copper mine. Because of the lack of dateable material, archaeologists have not yet been — and may never be — able to establish their age, origin, meaning, or much else that they would like to know.

The Trincheras culture site is located between two mountain massifs west of Caborca. It is the most spectacular sites with pre-Hispanic, as engravings practically cover the slopes of two hills.

The number of petroglyphs is not known, there are thousands. There are a variety of motifs: animal groups, geometric designs, suns and moons astronomical representations of, bows, arrows, hunting scenes, etc. There is also an interesting diversity headdresses and head ornaments.

== Archaeology in Sonora ==
The Sonora archaeological heritage has a huge time depth, as demonstrated by evidence left by groups that 13,000 years ago populated this region. Towards northern Sinaloa and the coastal plains of the Fuerte, Mayo and Yaqui rivers, to the foothills of the Sierra Madre Occidental, developed the Huatabampo tradition, formed by communities that farmed cotton, corn, beans and pumpkin, by taking advantage of a large variety of coastal resources.

Towards the east is the “Serrana Tradición”, on which after 1,000 A.D., changes in housing types are seen, these are built on surface, with walls resting on stone foundations. The best known site of this tradition is in Baviácora, in the municipality with the same name.

Towards the northeastern end of the state, in the river Bavispe, Bacerac, Huachinera and Sahuaripa basins, are communities very similar to prehispanic sites as Casas Grandes, although it seems to constitute a different tradition which might be termed Carretas. These little hierarchical settlement societies combined occupation of villages on river terraces with adobe houses in caves, possibly for winter use.

Towards the Northwest of Sonora in the basins of the rivers Magdalena, Concepción, Imuris, altar and Cucurpe, there are trinchera culture communities, whose villages with hole houses became more numerous after 700 AD.

Sonora has numerous sites with engraved or painted rock designs, the best known are “La Proveedora” in the trinchera tradition region and “La Pintada”, in the Central Coast area.

== Site ==
There are many animal shapes, mainly Pronghorn and bighorn sheep (typical of the region), almost always in herds and sometimes depicting pregnant bellies. There is a coyote figure, a bird of prey (eagle) type face and turtles. There are solitary human figures and family groups with man, woman and children clearly distinguished. The human silhouette is made with lines, round heads and elongated necks. Also are many geometric figures representing circular spirals or square, tribal and Suns figures. A very interesting figure representing a sea shell necklace, an ornamental element widely used by civilizations inhabiting the Gulf of California coast and also coincides with the commercial and cultural trade in the Trincheras culture.

There are several scientific studies that some anthropologists and higher education institutions have made of the evidence of these ancient civilizations. Nonetheless, there are some contradictions and disagreements among some of the data -such as the age and meaning of these carvings- that do not allow us to make a reliable judgment about them. At a local level, however, those of us who live here and have very close and constant contact and personal experience with these drawings find it more comfortable, logical, and acceptable to give a simple and basic interpretation of the drawings, such as: goats, turtles, hunts, dances, moons, suns, directions, dates, and also artistic expression.

Professor Manuel Jorge González Montesinos from the University of Sonora has published a short easy to understand essay about the carvings. This work helps us sustain the following thesis: the region was inhabited by the Mogollon culture civilizations from the year 600 BC to 1400 AD.; by the Ancestral Puebloans from the year 100 BC., to 1450 AD.; by the Hohokam Culture from 300 BC., to 1400 AD., and also from 800 to 1200 AD.

Settlers were hunter-gatherer desert people with agricultural knowledge; established important irrigation systems for maize cultivation; developed the ability to design and use solar calendars engraved in stone, which indicated the beginning of the seasons of the year. These three cultures established a large communications network and roads that allowed them to develop a far-reaching commercial, cultural and social trade agreements among them. Trade products were baskets and woven objects, ceramics, corn, ritual ornaments, turquoise, seashells, salt, and even know-how and production technical.

The Trincheras civilization is located in the village of Trincheras, Sonora, actually owes its name to the peculiar type of constructions, placed at different levels on the hill that is close to the village. It seems to be a center for gathering and trade used often by these ancient settlers; which is why it was inhabited almost permanently. The constructions in the shape of trenches, in addition to being the place of dwelling for the settlers -because of the security the height afforded and their design geared for defense- were also places for observation and the celebration of ritual ceremonies.

Abundance of water during springtime due to the fact that the river was very near, made it a wise choice for long stays, as can be seen by plenty of indigenous tombs, remains of ceramic and stone artifacts that are found in the village's surrounding area.

Studies made for dating these settlements have been made -among other methods- by the tree-ring dating method on tree trunks. It has been concluded that Trincheras, Sonora as well as Snaketown, Arizona (south of Phoenix) are contemporary, dating back to 800 and 1200A.D. It is probable that the site was a commercial trade center among the dwellers of the north and those from the south, this is evidenced by the discovery of quetzal feathers in native tombs of those days. This type of bird could only be found in places like Oaxaca hundreds of miles away on the southern Pacific coast of Mexico. These feathers were highly priced by the Anasazi as well as by the Hohokam.

The Hohokam from southwest Arizona and northwest Sonora, constantly traveled to the sea to gather seashells and salt. The sites near Caborca which show traces of their passage and very probably flourished from the center of Trincheras, and it is almost certain that these sites were used only on temporary stays during those journeys to the sea. A great quantity of pieces of broken pots painted in the characteristic colors of those civilizations: red, ocher, purple, and brown can be easily found; seashells, grinding stones (Metate), axes, and other stone tools are not as easily found.

== Rock art ==
The figures carved on the rocks were made by direct percussion -very similar to chiseling- and they represent animals, human figures, frets, mazes, geometric shapes, heavenly bodies, and probably waves of the sea or aquatic symbols. The possible interpretations of these artistic manifestations made by the Hohokam could be any of the following: ritual scenes or ceremonies, retelling of a hunt, desert plants and animals, names of groups or tribes, calendars or dates, indicators of routes, changes in seasons or weather, or just plain art for its own sake.

The Hohokam civilization probably declined because of illnesses or prolonged droughts that greatly reduced the tribal groups. But they definitely are the ancestors of the current inhabitants of the Tohono O'odham Nation (people of the desert) more commonly known as pápagos. Although it is well known that they do not like being given that name.
