= Cahitan languages =

Uto-Aztecan language branch of Mexico

Cahitan
- Cahitan dictionary by Francisco Pimentel (click to browse pages)
- Geographic distribution: northern Mexico
- Ethnicity: Cáhita
- Linguistic classification: Uto-Aztecan: Southern; Cahitan
- Subdivisions: Yaqui; Mayo; ?Acaxee †

Language codes
- Glottolog: cahi1243
- Cahitan

The Cahitan languages are a branch of the Uto-Aztecan language family that comprises the Yaqui and the Mayo languages, both of Northern Mexico. The branch has been considered to be part of the Taracahitic languages, but this is no longer considered a valid genetic unit. The poorly attested language of the Acaxee has also been considered to be Cahitan.

== Languages ==
- Yaqui
- Mayo
- ?Conicari †
- ?Tepahue †
- ?Macoyahui †
- ?Baciroa †
- ?Comanito †
- ?Mocorito †
- ?Acaxee †
- ?Tahue †
