= Tecuexe =

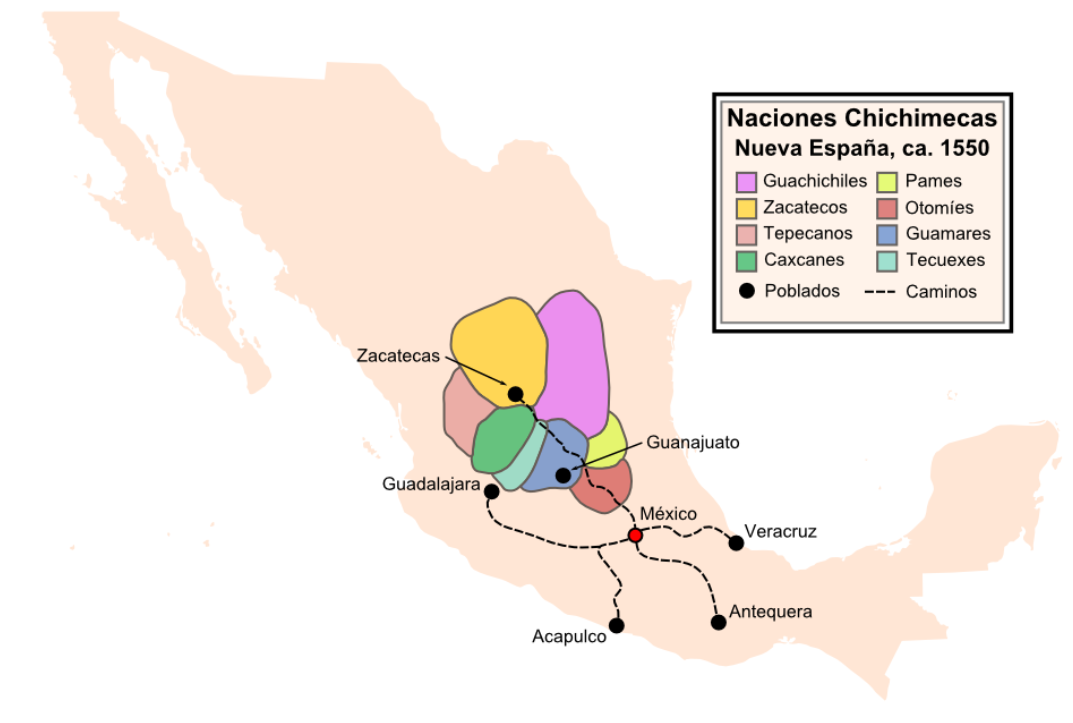
- Map of Chichimeca nations

Total population
- Unknown

Regions with significant populations
- Mexico (Jalisco)

Languages
- Tecuexe language and Spanish

Religion
- Roman Catholic and Indigenous Religion

Related ethnic groups
- Other Chichimecas

The Tecuexe were an Indigenous peoples of Mexico, who lived in the eastern part of present-day Guadalajara.

== History ==
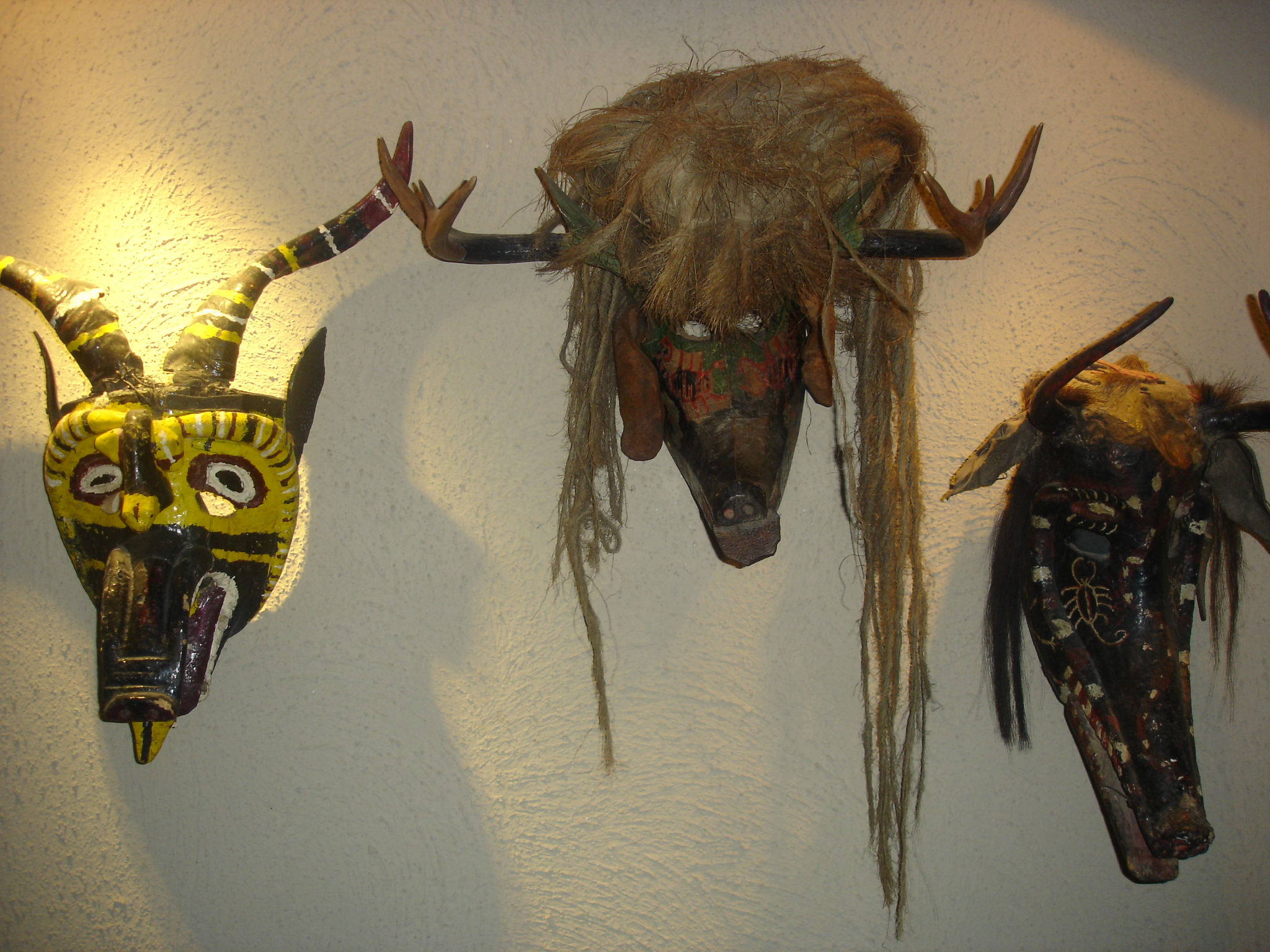
Tecuexe Masks from a museum in Zacatecas, Mexico near la Quemada.

It is believed that the Tecuexe derived from the dispersion of Zacateco groups from La Quemada. Like the Zacatecos, the Tecuexe were a tribe belonging to the generic "Chichimeca" peoples. It is known that they settled next to rivers which they used to their advantage to grow beans and corn. They were also expert artisans, carpenters and musicians. Toribio de Benavente Motolinia wrote "in any place… all know to work a stone, to make a house simple, to twist a cord and a rope, and the other subtle offices that do not require instruments or much art." The Tecuexe were known for their fierceness and cruelty towards their enemy. They were known to be so brave, it is said, that once, when the Mexica (Aztecs) came from Chicomostoc, Zacatecas to take control of Xolotl, (and course on to the lagoon where they found an eagle devouring a serpent) they attacked the settlers of Acatic, Teocaltiche, Mitic, Teocaltitán and Xalostotitlán, but in Tepatitlán, when they encountered the Tecuexe, having heard of their legendary cruelty, the Mexica avoided facing them.

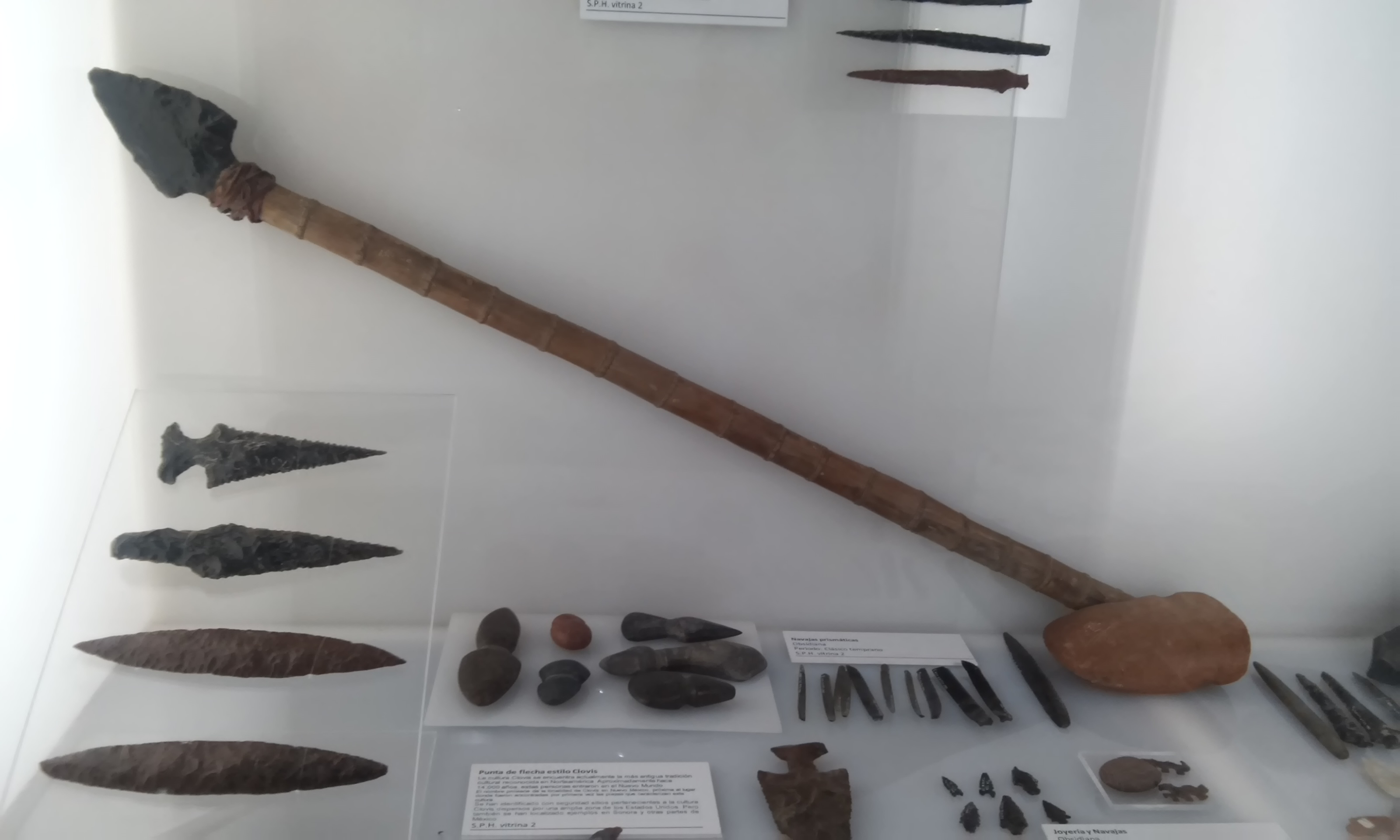
Tecuexe projectile points from Tepatitlán

The Tecuexes wore dresses with classic tilmatl (tilma) and huipilli, worn with comfortable cactlis and adorned their bodies with necklaces, bracelets, earrings and nose rings that they themselves made. They liked to make their houses in valleys and gorges near rivers, always in a position ready to battle. They also had temples in Teocaltiche, San Miguel el Alto, Jalostotitlán, Teocaltitan de Guadalupe and possibly in Tepatitlán.

The Tecuexes brought agaves from the wild, and cloned and grew them in open air settings to produce Tequila among other things (called pulque back then and stored in jugs).

According to Spanish missionary Juan de Padilla, Tonallan (Tonalá, Jalisco) was the biggest town under Tecuexe ruling. Tecuexe warriors had horizontal black bands tattoos right below their eyes. Tonallan was led by a woman, Cihualpilli (meaning queen) Tzapotzinco (meaning distinguished and fine zapote fruit), that Padilla described as tall and very beautiful, and who resided in a palace on the hilltops of Tonallan (Xitépec hill). It was during a dinner at her palace that the Mixtón War broke. Padilla attributes the victory of the Spaniards to the divine help of Saint James Matamoros, which explains why the first chapel built by the Tecuexe Catholics was named after Santiago.

== Language ==
The Tecuexe language is now extinct and very little is known about it. It was likely a Uto-Aztecan language.

The study of the toponyms of the Rio Verde region in Los Altos de Jalisco infers the presence of abundant words ending in íc/tíc, which is consistent with a similar phenomenon in the Valles de Tequila region, where very similar locative suffixes are usually related to the presence of groups speaking languages of the Corachol branch of the Uto-Aztec family. In the local toponymy, cases were also detected where the locative is expressed in the endings lí or chi, clearly derived from the íc/tíc (e.g. Temacapulí and Teocaltichi). It is highly probable that these suffixes are of Tecuexe origin, and equivalent to the Nahua "tlan". The island of Atitlán (place in the middle of the water in Nahuatl) was also known as Atlitíc, whose meaning would be equivalent to the Nahua word.

Some colonial era Tecuexe wrote documents in Nahuatl. A 1611 Petition to Remove a Priest in Jalostotitlan, a Tecuexe town, contained linguistic idiosyncrasies compared to central Mexican Nahuatl. This raises questions about whether the Tecuexe spoke a dialect of Nahuatl as a native language, or used it as a lingua franca.

The Caxcan to the north of the Tecuexe also spoke Nahuatl, although the Spaniards called it "corrupted Nahuatl".

== Spanish Conquest ==
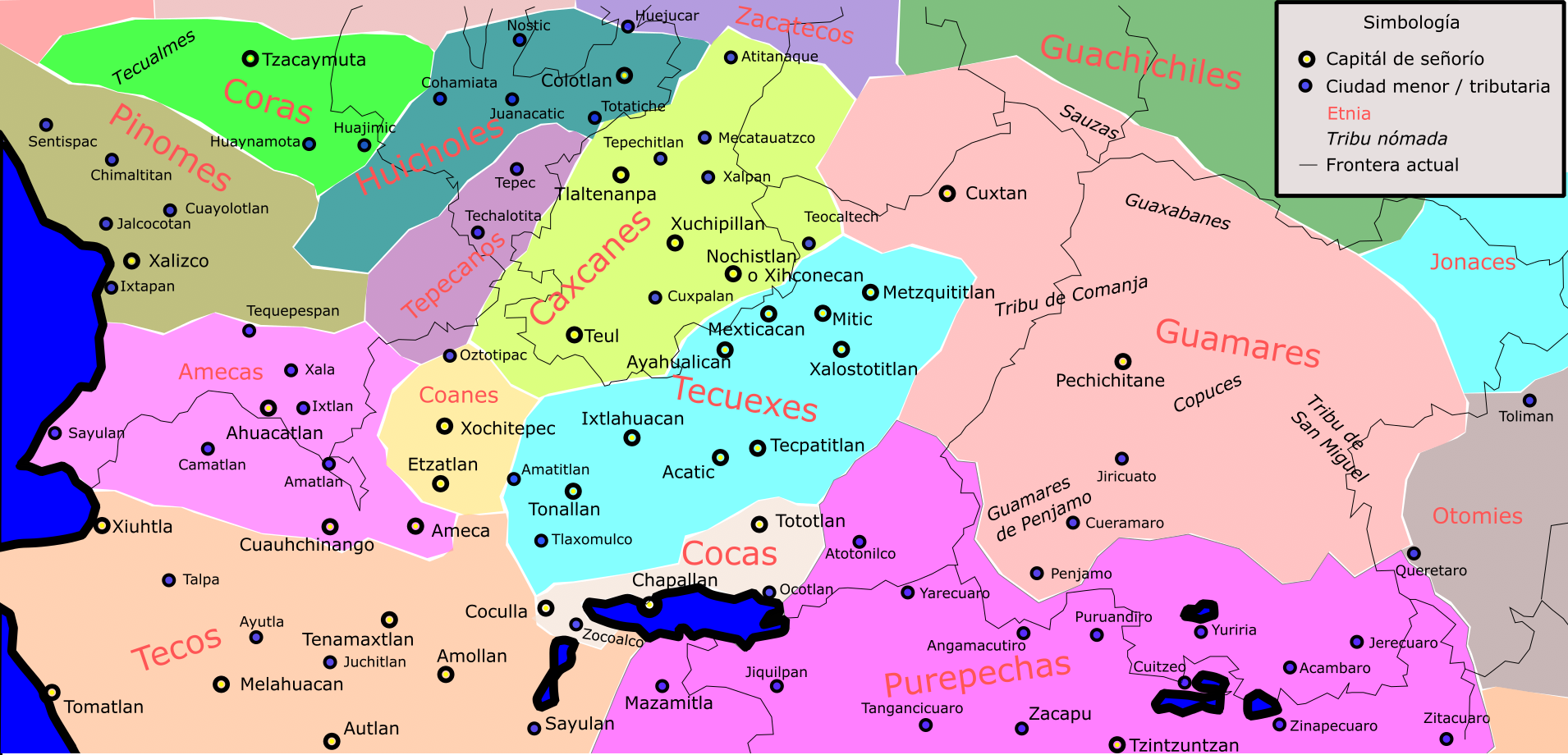
Ethnic groups in the region of the Tecuexes shortly before the start of the Spanish colonization of Mexico

The Tecuexe were conquered by Captain Nuño Beltrán de Guzmán, who began his siege on December 21 of 1529. His army consisted of 200 Spaniards on horse, 300 infantry on foot, 10,000 Mexicas (Aztecs) and 10,000 Tarascos and Tlaxcaltecas who had switched to the Spanish side. In the fight, many died. Some took refuge in the mountain areas, and those that remained in the plains were enslaved and forced into hard labor. About ten years later, the Tecuexe took their revenge. They were one of many tribes who fought under Tenamaxtli in the Mixtón War (1540–41). It is said that about 100,000 natives were gathered on the Mixton Mountain, ready to end Spanish rule, and that behind every stone, tree or bush was a native Caxcán, Tecuexe, Coca or Chichimeca, ready to subdue the invaders.

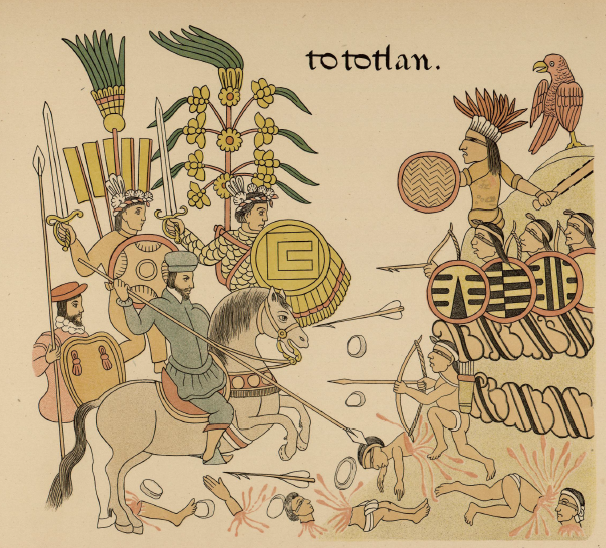
16th Century battle scene between Tecuexes of Tototlan-Culnao and Spanish with Tlaxcallan allies.

== Colonial Era ==
During the colonial era, several Tecuexe pueblos petitioned for indigenous ownership of the land. "The most usual way to justify the old indigenous possession was to appeal to it. Sometimes allusion was made only to the immemorial use of the land..."

== The Last of the Tecuexe ==
The last Tecuexe chief is said to have been Chapalac, who the lake of Chapala is named after. In the end, the Spanish power prevailed, but some natives, rather than surrendering and being enslaved, threw their women and their children head first off the cliffs. This was soon stopped by Franciscans. Acts like these were considered in parallel to Leónidas and his 300 soldiers who died fighting until the last man.

It is said that by 1854 no one in the tribe could speak their native language, and much of their identity was forgotten. Although collective memory and cultural vestiges from their indigenous past remain among Tecuexe descendants, they no longer exist as a distinct cultural group.
