= Acaxee language =

Extinct Uto-Aztecan language

Acaxee
- Aiage
- Native to: Mexico
- Region: Sinaloa and Durango
- Ethnicity: Acaxee
- Extinct: (date missing)
- Language family: Uto-Aztecan: Southern; Taracahitic; Cahitan?; Acaxee

Language codes
- ISO 639-3: None (mis)
- Glottolog: None

Acaxee is an extinct Southern Uto-Aztecan language spoken by the Acaxee in what are now the Mexican states of Sinaloa, Durango, and perhaps southwestern Chihuahua. It was possibly a Cahitan language, but little documentation of it survives.

Father Pedro Gravina, who spent 35 years in the Acaxee region wrote "Arte muy perfecto de la lengua acaxee, con vocabulario", a document not found in the archives of the Society of Jesus or in other institutions with bibliographic collections of this religious order. Nor have Hernando Santorem's notes and writings on Acaxee appeared, nor Father Gonzalo de Tapia's catechism and doctrine in Acaxee.
