= Giamina language =

Extinct Uto-Aztecan language

Giamina
- Omomil
- Native to: United States
- Region: California
- Ethnicity: Giamina/Omomil
- Extinct: (date missing)
- Language family: Uto-Aztecan: Northern; (unclassified); Giamina

Language codes
- ISO 639-3: None (mis)
- Glottolog: omom1235

Giamina (Omomil) is an extinct Uto-Aztecan language formerly spoken in the American state of California, between Poso Creek and the Kern River. It is poorly attested, with only around 20 words collected in the early 20th century, but can be clearly classified as Uto-Aztecan. An elderly Yokuts man stated they were identical with the Kumachisi, a subdivision of the Tübatulabal.

== Vocabulary ==
gloss	Giamina	gloss	Giamina
1	tcupu	house	ni-ku
2	hewe	water	bal, bal-aku
3	pohoim	road	bèkt
4	wadja	mountain	tabakwan
5	madjindji	across	dab-iku
6	pābahai	no	hahītcu, ahītciwa
person	xöxinil, xaxinil	much, many	em
man	muut	drink	hüüka
woman	wiʼct	kill	mikʼan
deer	piāt		
