= Buckingham Smith =

American writer and politician

Thomas Buckingham Smith (October 31, 1810 - January 5, 1871) was a lawyer, diplomat, antiquarian and author. He researched the history of early Spanish exploration and settlement in North America. Smith translated and published several important Spanish documents relating to this history.

== Biography ==
Smith was born October 31, 1810, on Cumberland Island, Georgia, the son of Josiah and Hannah Smith. When Smith's father was appointed U.S. Consul to Mexico, the rest of the family settled in St. Augustine, Florida in 1820. Smith received his early education in Florida and visited his father in Mexico when he was about fourteen. The elder Smith died in 1825 and Buckingham became the ward of his uncle, Robert Smith. Smith attended Trinity College in Hartford, Connecticut and later earned a degree from Harvard Law School in 1836. After graduation, Smith worked in the law offices of Samuel Fessenden, a politician and abolitionist.

When he returned to St. Augustine in 1839, he practiced law and became involved in politics. He was a secretary to Robert R. Reid, governor of the Territory of Florida, and served one term on the Florida Territorial Legislative Council in 1841. In 1843 he married Julia Gardner of Concord, New Hampshire.

In 1845 Florida was admitted as a state and the federal government was anxious to explore its economic potential. In 1847, the U.S. Senate appointed Smith to conduct a survey of the Florida Everglades. He spent five weeks performing a careful analysis of the terrain and its wildlife and submitted a report in 1848. His report is considered the first official publication on the area. In his report Smith advocated draining the swamp with a series of canals and using the reclaimed land to grow citrus crops.

At some point Smith became interested in the history of early Spanish exploration and settlement in America. With a desire to review the Spanish archives in Mexico, he sought and was granted an appointment to the US diplomatic delegation in Mexico in 1850. After serving there for two years, he returned home and then received an appointment as the US secretary of legation to Spain in 1855. In Spain he became friends with noted historian, Pascual de Gayangos, and continued his archival research with an emphasis on the early history of Florida. He also assisted other American historians including Francis Parkman and George Bancroft.

He was recalled from Spain in 1858 and again returned to St. Augustine. Although Smith was a slave owner, he sided with the Union during the Civil War. In 1864 he served as a delegate at the Republican convention in Baltimore. Shortly afterwards he returned to Spain to continue his archival studies. In 1868 Smith was back in Florida where he was appointed tax commissioner. In 1870 he moved to New York City and died there on January 5, 1871.

In his will, Smith bequeathed lands to one of his former slaves and cash to others. He set aside the rest of his estate to establish the Buckingham Smith Benevolent Association with a mission to benefit current and future generations of blacks in St. Augustine. His manuscripts and library were donated to the New York Historical Society.

He is listed as a Great Floridian. He was elected a member of the American Antiquarian Society in 1862.

== Works ==
Smith wrote on a variety of topics including Spanish exploration and colonization, Native American history, linguistics, and geography. Some of his most important works include translations of Spanish and Portuguese manuscripts:

- The Narrative of Alvar Nuñez Cabeça de Vaca (1851), translated from the Spanish;
- Letter of Hernando de Soto and Memoir of Hernando de Escalante Fontaneda (1854);
- Colección de Varios Documentos para la Historia de la Florida y Tierras adyacentes (1857);
- Narratives of the Career of Hernando de Soto in the Conquest of Florida, as told by a Knight of Elvas (1866) translated from the Portuguese;
