= Tonichi =

Coordinates: 28°35′56″N 109°33′56″W

- town
- Seal
- Interactive map of Tonichi
- Country: Mexico
- State: Sonora
- Municipality: Soyopa Municipality

Government
  - Mayor: Arnoldo Moreno Encinas

Population (2005)
  - Total: 224
- Time zone: UTC-7 (Central Standard Time)
  - Summer (DST): UTC-7 (Central Daylight Time)
- Postal code: 85650 Mexico

Tonichi is a town in the Soyopa Municipality, in the eastern region of the Mexican state of Sonora near the Río Yaqui. The elevation is 180 meters.

The population was 224 in 2005. The Jesuits built Mission Nuestra Señora del Populo de Tonintzi in the 17th century.

The area around Tonichi is rich in minerals.

Near the municipality is the district of charcoal from Santa Clara.

Steve Clemente, actor known for playing villains, and an expert knife-thrower, was born in Tonichi.
