= Mayo people =

Indigenous group in Mexico

Mayo Yoremé
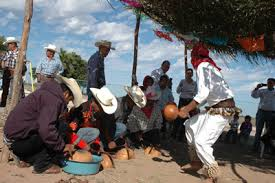
- Mayo deer dance

Total population
- 40,000

Regions with significant populations
- Mexico: 40,000

Languages
- Mayo, Spanish

Religion
- traditional religion, Roman Catholicism

Related ethnic groups
- Yaqui

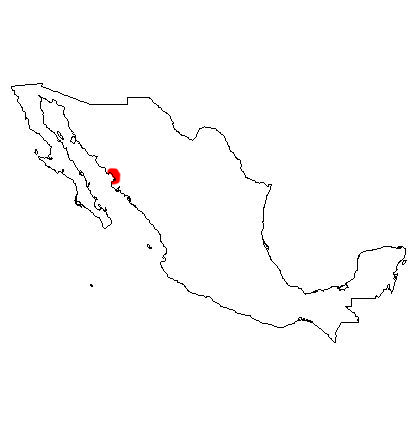
Approximate homeland of Mayo people

The Mayo or Yoreme are an Indigenous group in Mexico, living in southern Sonora, northern Sinaloa and small settlements in Durango.

Mayo people originally lived near the Mayo River and Fuerte River valleys. The Mayo sustain themselves mainly by agriculture and fishing, but also create artwork and crafts.

== Name ==
In their own language, they call themselves Yoreme. The term Mayo means "people of the river bank", in reference to the Mayo River.

== Language ==
The Mayo language belongs to the Cahita branch of the Uto-Aztecan language family. It is closely related to Yaqui and it is spoken by approximately 40,000 people (Ethnologue 1995 census).

== Culture ==
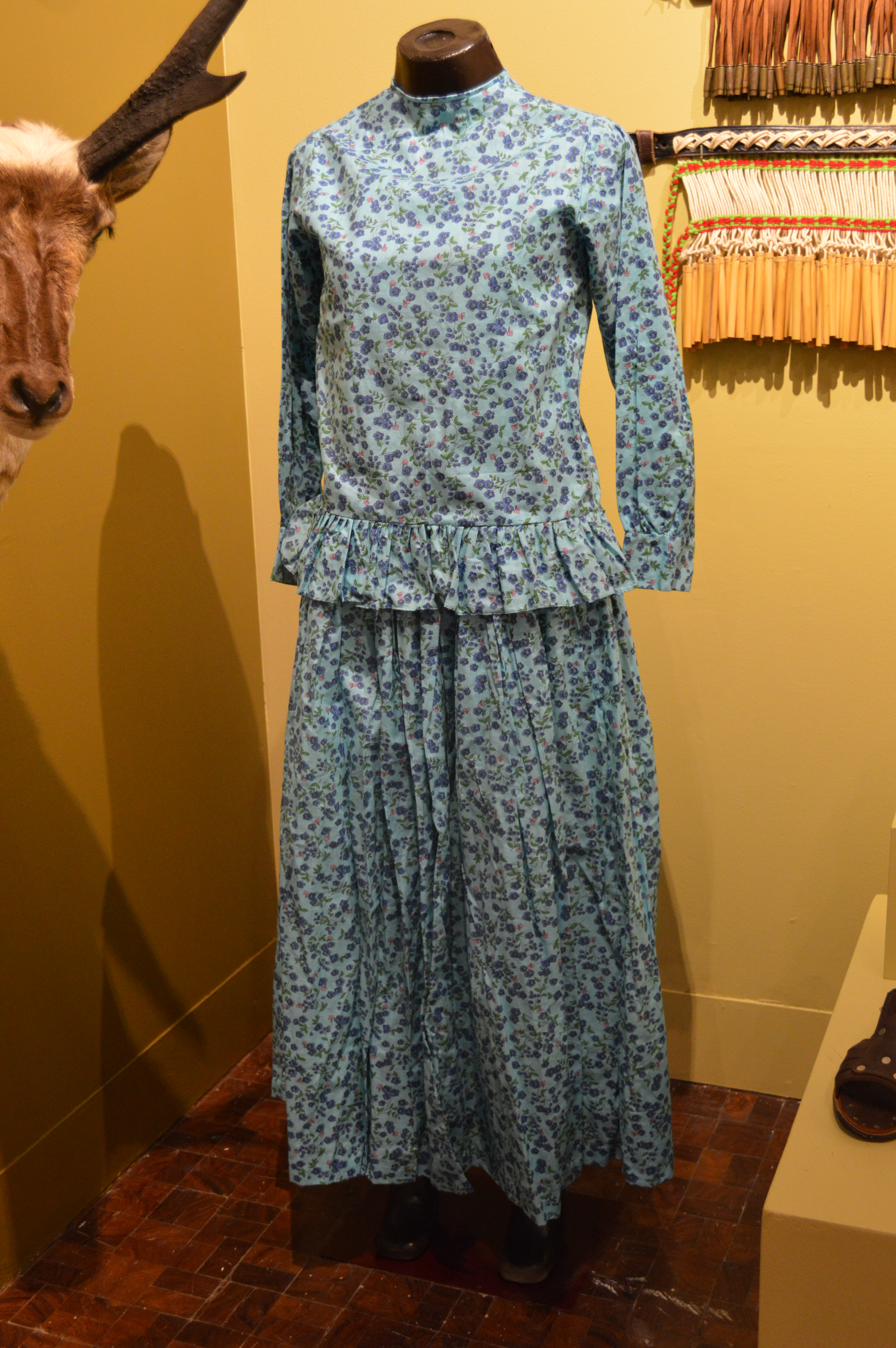
Customary, everyday dress worn by Mayo women, displayed at the Museo de Arte Popular in Mexico City.

They own traditional authorities, who are elected by vote and their hierarchy is respected on par with the Mexican civil laws.

The earliest inhabitants of this region hunted, fished, and gathered plants. They gradually developed an agricultural technique that allowed them to settle in various communities. On arrival of the Spaniards in the present-day states of Sonora and Sinaloa, the Mayos were part of an Indian confederacy with the Apaches, Pima, and Yaqui. Their purpose was the joint defense of the invasion of other groups, mutual respect for their territory, and cultural exchange.

Currently, most Mayo farm, often with advanced techniques. They fish and make handicrafts intended for use by the community. They build their adobe or wood houses, depending on the climate and location.

== Communities ==
The Mayo live in the following settlements:

=== Sonora ===
- Álamos Municipality (settlements such as Álamos and El Salado).
- Benito Juárez Municipality (settlements such as Aceitunitas (Sube y Baja) and Villa Juárez).
- Cajeme Municipality (settlements such as Agrícola Tarasca, Ciudad Obregón, Cócorit, and Zona de Granjas (Granjas Mica)).
- Etchojoa Municipality (settlements such as Agustín Melgar, Bacobampo, Etchojoa, and Yemobari).
- Huatabampo Municipality (settlements such as Adolfo López Mateos, Huatabampo, and Zamicarit).
- Navojoa Municipality (settlements such as Agiabampo, Navojoa, and Yorentamehua).
- San Ignacio Río Muerto Municipality (settlements such as Agraristas de Ciudad Obregón, and Tetabiate).

=== Sinaloa ===
- Ahome Municipality (settlements such as 89 B de I, Ahome, and Zapotillo Uno (Zapotillo Viejo)).
- Angostura Municipality (settlements such as Alhuey, Angostura, and San Luciano).
- Choix Municipality (settlements such as Agua Caliente Grande (De Gastelum), Choix, and Rincón de Agua Caliente Grande).
- El Fuerte Municipality (settlements such as Adolfo López Mateos (Jahuara Segundo) and Zozorique).
- Guasave Municipality (settlements such as Adolfo Ruíz Cortines, Guasave, and Tamazula)

== History ==
The first traces of settlements in the Mayo region date from 180 CE in the present municipality of Huatabampo, Sonora.

In 1531, after the conquest of the Aztec Empire by the Spanish, military campaigns were organized to subdue the Mayo region to the Spanish crown. However, this was not achieved until 1599, through the mediation of Jesuit missionaries.

The Jesuit Pedro Méndez tried evangelizing the Mayo. However, Mayos did not cease to resist the Spaniards. In 1740 marked an armed uprising, which ended with victory again for the Spanish, after which a period of peace lasted almost a century.

For 1867 the Mayo returned to take up arms with the Yaquis against the government of Mexico. They achieved a peace agreement after the Mexican Revolution with the distribution of land as communal property. The Mayo fought with Alvaro Obregón's Constitutionalist fighters during the revolution.

== Festivities ==
The main Mayo festival takes place during Easter and portrays the passion of Christ. Other festivals celebrated St. Juan Bautista, St. Francis of Assisi, and the Virgin of Guadalupe.

== Mayo flag ==
The Mayo Flag was designed by a young Sonoran individual, whose name is not known. A deer surrounded by stars, called masochoquim or "Deer of the stars" in Cahita culture, stands on an orange field, representing the earth.

== Notable Mayo people ==
- Fernando Valenzuela, professional baseball player
- Joel Huiqui, professional association football player
- Jesús Malverde, Folk saint
