= Opata language =

Extinct Uto-Aztecan languages of Mexico

Ópata
- Teguima
- Vocabulary of the Opata language of unknown date and origin, part of the collection of the Cervantine Library in Monterrey
- Native to: Mexico, U.S.
- Region: Sonora, Arizona
- Ethnicity: Opata
- Extinct: 1930s
- Revival: 21st century
- Language family: Uto-Aztecan: Ópata

Language codes
- ISO 639-3: opt
- Glottolog: opat1247
- ELP: Ópata
- Opatan

Ópata (also Tegüima, Teguima, Tehuima, Tehui, Tonichi, Sonori and Ure; Opata: Teguima) is a Uto-Aztecan language, closely related to Eudeve, spoken by the Opata people of northern central Sonora in Mexico and Southeast of Arizona in the United States. It was believed to be dead already in 1930, and Carl Sofus Lumholtz reported the Opata to have become "Mexicanized" and lost their language and customs already when traveling through Sonora in the 1890s.

In a 1993 survey by the Instituto Nacional Indigenista, 15 people in the Mexican Federal District self-identified as speakers of Ópata. This may not mean, however, that the language was actually living, since linguistic nomenclature in Mexico is notoriously fuzzy. Sometimes Eudeve is called Opata, a term which should be restricted to Teguima. Eudeve (which is split into the Heve (Egue) and Dohema dialects) and Teguima (also called Ópata, Ore) are distinct languages, but sometimes have been considered merely dialects of one single language. The INALI (Mexican National Institute for Indigenous Languages) does not count Opata among the currently extant indigenous languages of Mexico.

== Classification ==
Opata had long been considered to be part of the Taracahitic languages, but this is no longer considered a valid genetic unit.

== Revival ==
Although the Opata Nation, an unrecognized tribe, considers the language "inactive", they are in the process of its language revitalization. The Fundación OPATA-TEGUIMA launched the first-ever Opata Living Dictionary in 2021 in collaboration with Living Tongues Institute for Endangered Languages.

== Phonology ==
=== Consonants ===
		Labial	Dental	Alveolar	Palatal	Velar		Glottal
		Labial	Dental	Alveolar	Palatal	plain	lab.	Glottal
Nasal		m		n				
Plosive/ Affricate	voiceless	p	t͡s	t	t͡ʃ	k		ʔ
Plosive/ Affricate	voiced	b	d͡z	d		ɡ	ɡʷ	
Fricative		β	θ	s	ʃ	(x)		h
Rhotic			r	ɾ				
Approximant							(w)	

- /h/ can also be heard as velar [x] in free variation.
- /r/ is commonly articulated as dental [r̪], and can also be heard as aspirated [r̪ʰ] in free variation.
- /ɾ/ can also be heard as a trill [r] in emphatic speech.
- /ɡʷ/ may also be heard as [w] before /u/ in free variation.
- Intervocalic /t/ may of become [ɾ] judging by "xunuta" being borrowed into spanish as "sonora"

=== Vowels ===
	Front	Central	Back
Close	i iː		u uː
Mid	e eː		o oː
Open		a aː	

== Morphology ==
Opata is an agglutinative language, where words use suffix complexes for a variety of purposes with several morphemes strung together.
