= Mayo language =

Uto-Aztecan language of the Americas

Mayo
- Yorem Noki
- Native to: Sonora, Sinaloa, and parts in Durango, Mexico
- Ethnicity: 100,000 Mayo (1983)
- Native speakers: 39,000 (2020 census)
- Language family: Uto-Aztecan: Cahitan; Mayo

Official status
- Official language in: Mexico

Language codes
- ISO 639-3: mfy
- Glottolog: mayo1264
- ELP: Mayo
- Mayo is classified as Critically Endangered by the UNESCO Atlas of the World's Languages in Danger.

Mayo, known natively as Yorem Noki, is an Uto-Aztecan language. It is spoken by about 40,000 of the Mayo (Yoreme) people, who live in the southern portion of the Mexican state of Sonora and in the north of the neighboring state of Sinaloa. Under the General Law on the Linguistic Rights of Indigenous Peoples, it is recognized as a "national language" along with 63 other indigenous languages and Spanish which all have the same validity in Mexico. The language is considered 'critically endangered' by UNESCO.

The Mayo language is partially intelligible with the Yaqui language, and the division between the two languages is more political, from the historic division between the Yaqui and the Mayo peoples, than linguistic.

Programming in both Mayo and Yaqui is carried by the INPI's radio station XEETCH-AM, broadcasting from Etchojoa, Sonora.

== Phonology ==
=== Consonants ===
	Bilabial	Dental	Alveolar	Palatal	Velar	Glottal
Nasal	m	n				
Plosive	p, bʷ	t		t͡ʃ	k	ʔ
Fricative	β		s			h
Trill			r			
Lateral			l			
Semivowel	w			j		

=== Vowels ===
	Front	Back
Close	i iː	u uː
Mid	e eː	o oː
Open	a aː	

== Alphabet ==
The mayo alphabet contains the following letters

a, b, c, ch, e, gu, hu, i, j, l, m, n, o, p, qu, r, s, t, u, y, '

== Morphology ==
Mayo is an agglutinative language, where words use suffix complexes for a variety of purposes with several morphemes strung together.
