= Rarámuri language =

Uto-Aztecan language spoken in Mexico

Rarámuri
- Tarahumara
- Rarámuri ra'ícha
- Native to: Mexico
- Region: Chihuahua
- Ethnicity: Rarámuri
- Native speakers: 92,000 (2020 census)
- Language family: Uto-Aztecan: Southern Uto-Aztecan; Tarahumaran; Rarámuri

Official status
- Official language in: One of 63 national languages of Mexico
- Regulated by: Secretaría de Educación Pública

Language codes
- ISO 639-3: Variously: tar – Central Tarahumara thh – Northern Tarahumara tcu – Southeastern Tarahumara twr – Southwestern Tarahumara tac – Western Tarahumara
- Glottolog: tara1321
- ELP: Tarahumara
- Pre-contact (green) and current (red) extent of Tarahumara in Mexico

- Tarahumara is classified as Vulnerable by the UNESCO Atlas of the World's Languages in Danger.

Rarámuri (Tarahumara, endonym: Rarámuri/Ralámuli ra'ícha 'people language') is a Uto-Aztecan language indigenous to Mexico and spoken by around 70,000 Rarámuri (Tarahumara/Ralámuli) people in the state of Chihuahua. It is the second most-widely spoken Uto-Aztecan language after Nahuatl.

== Classification ==
Rarámuri was previously considered to belong to the Taracahitic group of the Uto-Aztecan languages, but this grouping is no longer considered valid. It is now grouped in a Tarahumaran group along with its closest linguistic relative, the Guarijío language (Varihio, Huarijío), which is also spoken in the Sierra Madre Occidental.

== Dialects ==
Rarámuri is spoken by 70,000 or more Indigenous Mexicans living in the state of Chihuahua. There is no consensus among specialists on the number of dialects: competing proposals include two (Western and Eastern); four (Western, Northern, Southern, Eastern); and five, according to field surveys conducted in the 1990s by linguists working for the Mexican government and Ethnologue. Mexican researchers emphasize that the knowledge of Rarámuri dialects is still patchy, and they say there is a possibility that there are many more than five dialects. The five divisions tentatively recognized by the Mexican government are not the same ones proposed by Ethnologue.

The landscape of the area is dominated almost entirely by the Sierra Madre Occidental, a mountain range in western Mexico. As of 2011, Ethnologue splits Eastern into four dialects. The five dialects recognized by Ethnologue, with Ethnologue's own current designations and population estimates, are Western (40,000 speakers); Central (55,000, including 10,000 monolinguals); Northern (300); Southeastern (no estimate given); and Southwestern (100). The figure of 40,000 is cited as an being official census figure from 1996.

Historian Manuel Orozco y Berra identified four dialects: Varohio, Guazapare, Pachera, and Tubar.

== Usage ==
The language is used in primary schools and local administration as well as in traditional religious practices and local business transactions. According to Ethnologue, Spanish speakers who live near or among the Rarámuri often use it in commerce as well. At the same time, Spanish is becoming ever more prevalent in Indigenous communities. Currently, only 1% of the speakers are literate in their language, while 20% of them are literate in Spanish.

== Phonology ==
Rarámuri has five vowel phonemes: /a, e, i, o, u/. Additionally, [ə] occurs as an allophone of /a/ word-initially and between a stressed close vowel and the glottal stop. Phonemically, all plosive consonants are voiceless. There are four fricative phonemes, two voiced and two voiceless; but the voiced fricatives /β, ɣ/ both have a plosive allophone: [b] and [ɡ]. /β/ is heard as [b] when in word-initial position, and /ɣ/ as [ɡ] when following /n/ respectively. The phoneme /r/ has two allophones: a trilled and a forward-flapped variation. Both allophones occur phrase-initially, but the trilled allophone is much more common.

	Bilabial	Alveolar	Retroflex	Palatal	Velar	Glottal
Nasal	m	n				
Plosive	p	t			k	ʔ
Affricate		t͡s~t͡ʃ				
Fricative	β	s~ʃ			ɣ	h
Liquid		ɾ	𝼈			
Approximant	β̞			j		

/t͡ʃ, ʃ, j, ʔ, h/ are spelled ⟨ch⟩, ⟨sh⟩/⟨s⟩, ⟨y⟩, ⟨ʼ⟩, ⟨j⟩; /s/ is spelled ⟨s⟩/⟨c⟩

[ʃ] is an optional allophone of /s/ before [i, u], while [t͡s] is an optional allophone of /t͡ʃ/ before [a, o, u]. Some writers spell [s, ʃ] as ⟨s⟩, ⟨sh⟩, respectively, while others spell them ⟨c⟩, ⟨s⟩, respectively.

/𝼈 / is alveolar [ɺ] in some dialects.

Some important phonological rules:

1. In phrase-initial syllables not followed immediately by a vowel, [h], or [ʔ], unstressed vowels acquire length.
2. Stressed phrase- and word-final vowels can optionally acquire voiceless offglides. Word-final vowels, however, only receive offglides when preceding a stressed syllable-initial plosive or affricate.
3. Word-initially, [a] → [ə] if between a stressed [+high] vowel and [ʔ].
4. In unstressed, word-medial or –final syllables, [i] becomes allophonically less tense.
5. In fast speech, vowels in unstressed syllables are frequently dropped.
6. In unstressed, word-medial or –final syllables, all vowels are dropped when following a nasal and preceding a plosive.

== Grammar ==
The following description is based on Burgess (1984) unless otherwise noted.

=== Morphology ===
Affixes are almost all suffixes, and clitics too come word finally. Nouns and verbs are semiagglutinating. Words and phrases are head initial. Adpositions can be prepositions or postpositions, and some are suffixed to nouns.

In noun morphology, there are two cases: nominative and accusative. Both direct and indirect objects are marked with the suffix [-ʔt͡ʃi]. In addition to case marking, there are also the characteristic Uto-Aztecan "absolutive" suffixes, which appear when there is no other suffix. Variants of the absolutive include [-ʔt͡ʃi] [-ri]. Possessed nouns are marked in several different ways: verbal constructions, noun suffixing, or a combination of the two. In terms of noun suffixing, possessives are marked with [-ra]. Some nouns are not inflected for plurality, but noun phrases containing them will mark plurality by other means: quantity words will be added to the noun phrase or words related to the head will be inflected for plurality.

Demonstratives mark proximity/distance but number. Given that Rarámuri is head final, demonstratives come before the noun. They can be used as both articles and pronouns, and can also be doubled. Storytellers will sometimes omit demonstratives in front of names of animals, showing that the animal is being ranked higher on the animacy scale and/or the animal name is being used as a proper noun.

There are several verbal suffixes for both the future and past tenses, with allomorphs of all three of the future tense suffix markers . The imperfect, conditional, passive voice, plural and singular imperative, and past participle are all marked for with suffixes as well. There are several suffixes that indicate different types of gerunds: past, singular, and plural.

Subject can be marked for in one of two ways. A pronoun coming before the verb can mark for 1, 2, 3 person singular and plural. Additionally, a suffix coming after the TAM marker can mark for the subject as well. In this way, subject marking is more flexible than marking for tense, aspect, and mood; however, subject pronouns cannot be used in conjunction with subject suffixes.

There are multiple suffixes that can change nouns to verbs. These suffixes cover a range of meanings, from "become" or "make" to "put on", "take off", and "have". In a similar suffix-adding process, adjectives can also become verbs. In fact, verbs can also take on suffixes to become other verbs, though noun to verb constructions are the most productive of these types of transformations.

Rarámuri utilizes valence changing processes that will most often transitivize verbs. This feature is widespread in Uto-Aztecan languages. To transitivize a verb, it is necessary to change the final vowel of the verb root. The process of applicativization involves a suffix and prefix, as well a change in voicing for the root-initial bilabial consonant. This process goes both ways: if a bilabial is [+voice], it will become [-voice] with the addition of these affixes, and vice versa.

=== Syntax ===
Rarámuri syntactic structure is fairly free, but it does, of course, have a least marked form. Like most other Uto-Aztecan languages, its default word order is SOV. If there are indirect objects, temporal makers, or locative markers, these typically come after the verb. In any case, the least marked syntax is not always found, as there are many exceptions.

Word order marking of focus and topicalization is heavily used. A sentence constituent may be topicalized by placing it at the beginning of the sentence. Topicalization of the verb requires "emphatic" words to indicate the subject. The OVS order is the order most prevalent in narratives.

There are "emphatic" morphemes. The particle [-ka] is added to subjects; the particle [-ʔe] to noun phrases filling any grammatical role, and the suffix [-ri] is an intensifier on nouns and verbs. To "emphasize" adverbs, the prefix [ʔ-] is added. Pronouns can be emphasized by repeating them within the sentence. In order to add still more "emphasis" to a word that already has emphatic particles, the postposition /-pa/ can be added.

Rarámuri questions have the following constructions. Sentence initial question particles are necessary. Yes–no questions are marked with the sentence-initial question particle [-ta], which can sometimes be accompanied by rising intonation on the final syllable . Wh-questions are marked with a level or falling prosodic pitch on the last syllable. These words also share a similar phonetic characteristic in that they all contain the allomorph prefixes [t͡ʃi-] or [t͡ʃe-], with the exception of [kóe], "where", which, contains the same affix, only as a suffix instead of a prefix.

To form a relative clause in Rarámuri, speakers need only place a suffix, [-ame], on the verb of the relative clause in order to achieve grammaticality. Relative clauses can come before or after a head, with the difference only being in emphasis. Sometimes, heads to which relative clauses refer can be repeated. In such instances, the head will occur directly before and directly after the relative clause that belongs to it. There also exists a construction that masks itself as a relative clause, but is really a repetition of the subject of the sentence. Often, the second repetition of the subject will be amplified or expounded upon in some way. This syntactic style is not unique to Rarámuri, but rather, it can be found in many other Uto-Aztecan languages, notably Nawa.

== Mass media ==
Rarámuri language programming is carried by the CDI's radio station XETAR, broadcasting from Guachochi, Chihuahua.

== Works cited ==
- Brambila, David (1976). Diccionario Rarámuri-Castellano (Tarahumara).
- Burgess, Donald H. (1984). Langacker, Ronald W. (ed.). "Western Tarahumara". Studies in Uto-Aztecan Grammar 4: Southern Uto-Aztecan Grammatical Sketches. 56. Dallas: Summer Institute of Linguistics Publications in Linguistics: 1–149.
- Caballero, Gabriela (2008). Choguita Rarámuri (Tarahumara) Phonology and Morphology (PDF) (PhD thesis). University of California at Berkeley.
- Dakin, Karen (2007). "Final Features and Proto-Uto-Aztecan: A Contribution Using Morphological Reconstruction". In Salmons, Joe; Dubenion-Smith, Shannon (eds.). Historical Linguistics 2005: Selected Papers from the 17th International Conference on Historical Linguistics. John Benjamins. pp. 295–310.
- Deimel, Claus (2001). Nawésari: texte aus der Sierra Tarahumara. Berlin: D. Reimer.
- Miller, Wick R (1983). "Uto-Aztecan Languages". In Ortiz, Alfonso (ed.). Handbook of North American Indians, 10. Washington, D. C.: Smithsonian Institution. pp. 113–124.
- Valiñas, L. (2001). "Lengua,dialectos e identidad étnica en la Sierra tarahumara" [Language, dialect and ethnic identity in the Sierra Tarahumara]. In C. Molinari; E.Porras (eds.). Identidad y cultura en la sierra Tarahumara. Mexico: Instituto Nacional de Antropologíae Historia. pp. 105–125.
