= Yaqui language =

Uto-Aztecan language

Yaqui
- Yoem Noki
- Pronunciation: [joʔem noki]
- Native to: Mexico, U.S.
- Region: Sonora, Arizona
- Ethnicity: Yaqui people
- Native speakers: 20,000 in Mexico (2020 census); 640 in the USA (2015 census)
- Language family: Uto-Aztecan: Cahitan; Yaqui
- Writing system: Latin

Language codes
- ISO 639-3: yaq
- Glottolog: yaqu1251
- ELP: Yaqui
- Yaqui is classified as Vulnerable by the UNESCO Atlas of the World's Languages in Danger.

Hiaki
- Person: Hiaki / Yoeme
- People: Yaqui / Yoemem
- Language: Yoem Noki
- Country: Hiakim

Yaqui (or Hiaki), locally known as Yoeme or Yoem Noki, is a Native American language of the Uto-Aztecan family. It is spoken by about 20,000 Yaqui people in the Mexican state of Sonora and across the border in Arizona in the United States. It is partially intelligible with the Mayo language, also spoken in Sonora, and together they are called Cahitan languages.

== Phonology ==
The remarks below use the orthography used by the Pascua Yaqui Tribe in the United States. There are also several orthographic systems used in Mexico differing slightly, mainly in using Spanish values for several consonants and Spanish spelling rules: "rohikte" would be written "rojicte". There are minor differences in the sounds of Mexican and American dialects, the latter tending to exclude an intervocalic "r" and final "k".

=== Vowels ===
Yaqui vowel sounds are similar to those of Spanish:

	Front	Central	Back
Close	i		u
Mid	e ~ ɛ		o
Open		a	

Vowels may be either short or long in duration. Often, long vowels are shortened when they are used constructively: 'maaso' ('deer') is shortened to 'maso' in 'maso bwikam' ('deer songs'). Long vowels are written by doubling the vowel. Long vowels may change tone, but that is not represented in the written language. Yaqui has often been described as being a tonal or "pitch accent" language, but the modern forms of the language do not show any widespread and significant use of tonemes.

=== Consonants ===
		Bilabial	Alveolar	Palatal (-alveolar)	Velar	Glottal
Nasal		m	n			
Plosive/ Affricate	voiceless	p	t	t͡ʃ	k, k͡t	ʔ
Plosive/ Affricate	voiced	b, bʷ				
Fricative		β	s			h
Approximant		w	l	j		
Tap			ɾ			

The following consonantal sounds are present in Yaqui: b, ch, (d), (f), (g), h, k, l, m, n, p, r, s, t, v, w, y, and one or two glottal stops (IPA /ʔ/), represented by an apostrophe. Except for the glottal stops, most of them are pronounced nearly the same as they are in English, but "p", "t", and "k" are not aspirated. In the IPA, they are respectively /b t͡ʃ (d) (f) (ɡ) h k l m n p ɾ s t β w j/.

Many Yaqui speakers pronounce b and v exactly the same, as /β/. That appears to be intrinsic to Yaqui, rather than from the influence of Spanish, which has a similar feature. Additionally, there are two consonants written as clusters: "bw" (IPA /bʷ/) and "kt" (IPA /k͡t/), "bw" being a rounded "b" ('bwikam') and "kt" a simultaneous articulation of "k" and "t" ('rohikte'). The "kt" sound is found in many other Uto-Aztecan languages. Pronunciation of the rounded "b" as "b"+"w" and the "kt" as "k"+"t" is acceptable but non-native.

Also, "d", "f", and "g" are present only in English and Spanish loanwords and are substituted with the native sounds "t"/"r"/"l", "p", and "w"/"k", respectively.

In Mexico, many speakers substitute "g" for syllable-initial "w". That is largely because Spanish lacks a /w/ phoneme. The phone [w] is present in Spanish not as an independent consonantal phoneme but as a variant of the vowel /u/ and the consonant /g/ when it is before a /u/ or /o/. The use of "g" in place of "w" is considered by Yaqui speakers as an influence from Spanish and not standard Yaqui usage, even in Mexico.

==== Glottal stops ====
There is at least one glottal stop, which is phonemic. There also appears to be a "fainter" glottal stop that is sometimes used between vowels but with apparently little predictability. Whether it is phonemic or not is still unclear.

=== Sound symbolism ===
Sound symbolism is present in Yaqui. For example, a word with the phoneme /l/ in it may be pronounced normally, to denote approval from the speaker, or with /r/ replacing the /l/, to denote disapproval or disfavor on the part of the speaker. Either form is correct.

=== Devoicing ===
Devoicing occurs at the ends of phrases. That is especially notable with the phoneme /m/ and with vowels. Yaqui speech often sounds "breathy" to English speakers.

=== Gestures ===
One word, laute, has two contradictory meanings in translation into English: "quickly" and "slowly". (Incidentally, English has similar words of contrasting meanings: mercurial, which can mean either "unhesitating" or "scatter-brained", and quite which can mean "very" or "a little".)

Laute is often accompanied with a quick or slow open-handed movement to indicate the meaning, or it could be translated as "at a different speed" and requires a hand gesture to indicate the nature of the difference when that is needed for clarification.)

== Grammar ==
=== Syntax ===
Yaqui word order is generally subject–object–verb.

The object of a sentence is suffixed with "-ta".

Inepo hamutta vichu
I woman {look at}
"I am looking at the woman."

=== Word order structures ===
==== Subject object ====
The following sentences display a variation of the language's structure and the forms allowed. In the following example, we can see an S and an O. This structure of SO is allowable due to a common feature among languages— the verb/ copula to be. 'He' is the subject in this example and since 'he' shows no variation in positioning in the sentence, there will not be further explanation for it. The object in this example 'child' has the possessor 'him' preceding to show ownership, but what is being possessed by 'him' is the child. Therefore, 'child' has a nominalizer for being the object of the sentence and a possession marker on it for being possessed. Having the nominalizer on the 'child' allows the subject 'he' to imply a state of being on the 'child'. This structure SO uses the to be verb/ copula, when information is being stated that x is y.

ʹáapo ʹáʹa Yoém-ia-k
{He (SUBJ)} Him {Child-NZ-POS (OBJ)}
He is his child.

==== Subject verb object ====
In the following example, we can see an example of where the primary word order SOV, deviates to become SVO. Note the pronoun 'I' does not have any case marking active and is in pronoun form (see Cases on Pronouns). Next, on the first or main verb 'able', there is not any specification for the type of verb. When the main verb is followed by another verb, it seems the second verb becomes intransitivized. On the object of the sentence 'axe', there are multiple cases active: accusative case (the direct object of the verb), a plural suffix, and an instrumental case (the means by how or with what something gets done) on the noun.

née ʹáa Hi-máʹako Tépwa-m-mea
I(SUBJ) able INTR-chop Axe-ACC:PL-INST(OBJ)
I am able to chop with an axe.

==== Object subject verb ====
The following is an additional example that shows variant in word order than previously seen—OSV. In this structure, a suffix called connective is used to show that two constituents are being connected; simply, they function as a conjunction. Although this is a simple function, it is worth mentioning in understanding the way Yaqui functions as a system. The subject comes after the object in the correct subject pronoun form. Following is the verb 'remember', which may be a trigger to the word order. Perhaps this word order implies the topic should be who/what is being remembered.

ʹin malá-be-u ne wáate
My mother-CONN-to(OBJ) I(SUBJ) remember(V)
I remember my mother.

=== Case ===
Yaqui is a "noun-heavy" agglutinative language.

For example, the first person singular pronoun "in" or "ne" (which varies by dialect), is more often used in the form "inepo", which can be translated "within me". The "-(e)po" ending is quite common and seems to denote much more than simple physical inclusion.

Cases are marked on the nouns with suffixes. The following is a list of all the cases that are marked in the language.

Case	Function
Ablative	Movement away/ out of the noun it's attached to.
Absolutive	Core argument of the verb in the sentence; with intransitive verbs it acts as the subject of the verb, in transitive verbs it acts as the object of the verb.
Dative	The noun of which something is given, used with ditransitive verbs as the indirect object of the verb.
Instrumental	Conveys the means of accomplishment of the action expressed by the verb.
Locative	Attaches to the noun to indicate the location of the phrase.
Nominative	Used for the subjects in clauses, or when there is only one noun in the clause. It is marked on the subject when in clauses with Absolutive case marking on the object.
Possessor (part of Genitive function)	Used to show possession on nouns.

=== Nouns ===
Plural nouns are formed by adding the suffix "-im", or "-m" if the noun ends in a vowel. If the noun ends in a "t", it changes to "ch" when "-im" is added.

- Tekil – Job
- Tekilim – Jobs

If a plural noun is the object of a sentence, the suffixation of "-t" or "-ta" is not used.

Inepo haamuchim vichu
I women {look at}

=== Verbs ===
Usually, adding the suffix "-k" to a verb indicates past tense, though there are many exceptions. If a verb ends in a diphthong, "-kan" is added. If a verb ends in "-i", "-akan" is added. If a verb ends in "-o" or "-u", "-ekan" is added, and if a verb ends in "-a", "-ikan" is added. If a verb ends in "-k", "-an" is added.

Regularly, "-ne" indicates the future.

==== Tense and aspect ====
Yaqui possess a "prior state" or 'used to be, now deceased' suffix. It is -tu-káꞋu. This specific suffix attaches to a nominal noun to indicate a prior existence, but can also attach as a verb to reflect the state of a human noun (not only animate). For example, (suffixed as a verb) to the right.

The following is a table on the various tense markers that act more as aspectual values and epistemic states.

Tense/ Aspect	Suffix	Meaning/Use
Future tense marker	-nee	To convey some future effect of an action, probability or possibility
Future passive	-naa	Communicating a temporary future possibility relative to the time of being spoken.
Perfective aspect	-k; –ka as an allomorph with a specific set of words.	An action is happening at a point of time, NOT continuation or procession (unmarked form).
Imperfect particle	-ka	Emphasizing an action of duration and progressing, and when backgrounding another action in main clause.
Remote stative	-i; -ka + -i	Emphasizes a preceding action when accompanying another verb in a complex sentence. Can be paired with imperfective particle -ka.
Past continuative	-n; -ka + -n	General past continuative, used with –ka.
Inceptive aspect	-taite (SG); -hapte (PL)	To begin doing something or commence doing something
Cessative aspect	-yaáte	Means 'to cease' or 'to stop' as a stand-alone verb but combines as a Verb + Verb compound to indicate a completed action.

=== Adjectives ===
In Yaqui, adjectives very often act as verbs (in Afro-Asiatic linguistics, they would be called stative verbs). For instance, "vemela" or "new", would most often be used to mean "is new". Adjectives have tenses, the same as verbs.

=== Reduplication ===
Reduplication is present in Yaqui. Reduplicating the first syllable of a verb indicates habitual action:

- eta – shuts
- e'eta – usually shuts

Primary reduplication is also used to pluralize adjectives.

Reduplicating the second consonant of a verb is used to show that an action is performed rarely.

== Sample words and phrases ==
- o'ow – man
- hamut – woman
- tu'i hiapsek – kind (lit. "good hearted")
- yantela – peace
- halla'i – friend
- maaso – deer
- aamu – to hunt
- totoi (plural. totoim) – chicken

- aman ne tevote em yevihnewi – "I extend my greetings"

Greetings often are very formal. The following formula of four phrases is often used even among close friends:

- Lios em chania – "Greetings!" (to one person, to more than one: Lios em chaniavu) (lit. "God preserves you!", Lios [sometimes pronounced Lioh] is a very early borrowing of the Spanish "Dios")
- Lios em chiokoe – (the reply to the above, lit. "God pardons you!")
- Empo allea – "May you rejoice!" (lit. "In you happy", 'allea' is said to be from the Spanish 'alegre', meaning 'happy')
- Kettu'i – "How kind!"

=== Kinship terminology ===
Immediate family
	Male	Female
Mother	Malam	Ae
Father	Achai	Hapchi
Older Brother	Sai	Avachi
Younger Brother	Saila	Wai
Older Sister	Ako	Ako
Younger Sister	Wai	Wai

Extended family
	Father's	Mother's
Grandmother	Namuli	Namuli
Grandfather	Hamuli	Hamuli
Mother	Haaka	Asu
Father	Havoi	Apa
Older Brother	Haavi	Kumui
Younger Brother	Samai	Taata
Older Sister	Ne'esa	Chi'ila
Younger Sister	Nana	Mamai

== Language revitalization and teaching ==
In 2009, the Pascua Yaqui Tribal Council and the University of Arizona collaborated on a program in which tribal elders teach the Yaqui language to families. As of 2010, a revitalization project was underway at the university, "using 30 year old audio tapes recorded by tribal member Maria Leyva." As of 2012, "Any teaching materials, tools, lessons, audio lessons, etc.," on the website of the Pascua Yaqui Tribe were "restricted to 'Tribally enrolled Members' only."

== Bibliography ==
- Dedrick, John M.; Casad, Eugene H. (1999). Sonora Yaqui Language Structures. Tucson, AZ: University of Arizona Press. ISBN 9780816519811.
- Estrada Fernández, Zarina (2004). Diccionario yaqui-español y textos: Obra de preservación lingüística. Sonora: Universidad de Sonora/Plaza y Valdés Editores.
- Johnson, Jean Basset (1962). El Idioma Yaqui. México: Instituto Nacional de Antropología e Historia. (published posthumously)
- Shaul, David L. (1999). Yoeme-English English-Yoeme Standard Dictionary. New York: Hippocrene Books. ISBN 0-7818-0633-X.
- Spicer, Edward H. "Inventory of the Edward H. and Rosamond B. Spicer Papers, 1911-2000 (bulk 1937-1988); Series VIII: Yaqui Files, 1935-1995 (Bulk 1939-1988)". Arizona Archives Online.
