= Huarijio language =

Uto-Aztecan language spoken in Mexico

Huarijio
- Varihío, Guarijío
- Warihó, Warihío
- Native to: Mexico
- Region: Chihuahua, Sonora
- Ethnicity: Huarijio people
- Native speakers: 2,100 (2020 census)
- Language family: Uto-Aztecan: Southern Uto-Aztecan; Tarahumaran; Huarijio
- Dialects: Mountain (Wariho); River (Makurawe)

Official status
- Regulated by: Secretaría de Educación Pública

Language codes
- ISO 639-3: var
- Glottolog: huar1255
- ELP: Guarijío
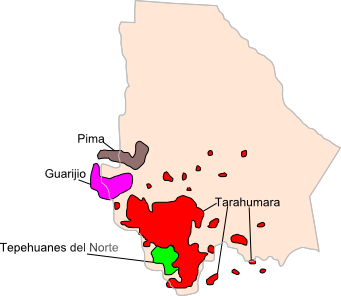
- Huarijio

- Mountain and River Guarijío are classified as Vulnerable by the UNESCO Atlas of the World's Languages in Danger.

Huarijio (Huarijío in Spanish; also spelled Guarijío, Varihío, and Warihío) is a Uto-Aztecan language of the states of Chihuahua and Sonora in northwestern Mexico. It is spoken by around 2,100 Huarijio people, most of whom are monolinguals.

== Distribution ==
The language has two variants, known as Mountain Guarijio (guarijío de la sierra) and River Guarijio (guarijío del río). The mountain variant is spoken in the Chihuahuan municipalities of Chínipas, Moris, and Uruachi. The river variant is found in the Sonoran municipalities of Álamos and Quiriego.

Speakers of Mountain Guarijio self-identify as Warihó and call River Guarijio speakers macurawe or makulái. River Guarijio speakers call themselves Warihío and call Mountain speakers tarahumaras. Contact between the two groups is scant and, although the linguistic differences between the two are slight, speakers report that mutual comprehension is difficult.

== Morphology ==
Guarijio is an agglutinative language, where words are morphologically complex to accomplish various grammatical purposes, i.e. several morphemes are strung together. The Guarijio language typologically has the tendency to show a final verb order. However, the word order in Guarijio is rather free.

== Phonology ==
The consonant inventory includes:

		Labial	Alveolar	Palatal	Velar	Glottal
Plosive/ Affricate	voiceless	p	t	t͡ʃ	k	ʔ
Plosive/ Affricate	voiced	b			ɡ	ʔ
Fricative			s	(ʃ)		h
Approximant		w	l ɾ	j		
Nasal		m	n			

The vowel inventory includes: /i/, /e/, /a/, /o/, /u/.

== Media ==
Programming in Guarijio is carried by the CDI's radio station XEETCH, broadcasting from Etchojoa, Sonora.
