= Pima Bajo language =

Uto-Aztecan language spoken in Mexico

Pima Bajo
- Oʼob Noʼok
- Native to: Mexico
- Region: Chihuahua, Sonora
- Ethnicity: Pima Bajo
- Native speakers: 740 (2015)
- Language family: Uto-Aztecan: Southern Uto-Aztecan; Tepiman; Pima Bajo
- Dialects: Eastern; Northern; Southern

Language codes
- ISO 639-3: pia
- Glottolog: pima1248
- ELP: O'ob
- Chihuahua Lower Pima is classified as Definitely Endangered by the UNESCO Atlas of the World's Languages in Danger.

Pima Bajo (Mountain Pima, Lowland Pima, Nevome) is a Mexican indigenous language of the Piman branch of the Uto-Aztecan language family, spoken by around 1,000 speakers in northern Mexico. The language is called Oʼob Noʼok by its speakers. The closest related languages are Oʼodham (Pima and Papago) and the O'othams.

There are three major communities in the Oʼob Noʼok region (Yepachic, Maycoba and Yécora), but many of the people live in small outlying hamlets and on isolated family ranches rather than the larger towns.

== Phonology ==
=== Vowels ===
	Front	Central	Back
Close	i iː	ɨ ɨː	u uː
Mid			o oː
Open		a aː	

=== Consonants ===
		Labial	Dental/ Alveolar	Velar	Glottal
Plosive	voiceless	p	t	k	ʔ
Plosive	voiced	b	d	ɡ	
Fricative		v	s		h
Nasal		m	n		
Rhotic			r		
Approximant			l		

- Sounds /t, s, n, l/ when preceding /i/ are heard as [tʃ, ʃ, ɲ, lʲ].
- /d/ can be heard as either sounds [ʒ] or [j] when in between two /i/ vowels.

== Morphology ==
Zarina Estrada-Fernández studied the language, publishing an overview of its grammar, syntax, and vocabulary. She identified consistent dialectal differences between communities in the region, especially between villages in Sonora and those in Chihuahua. Pima Bajo is an agglutinative language, where words use suffix-complexes for a variety of purposes with several morphemes strung together.

== Dialects ==
- Northern (spoken in the Madera, Chihuahua settlements of Agua Amarilla, Ciudad Madera, Ejido el Lago, El Cable, El Campo Seis, El Cordón, El Cuatro, El Largo, El Pedregal, El Potrero, El Presón, El Represito, El Río Chiquito, El Táscate, El Yerbanís, Junta de los Arroyos [Junta de los Ríos], La Bolada, La Ciénega, La Nopalera, Las Espuelas, Las Lajas, Los Arbolitos, Madera, Mesa Blanca, Mesa el Tecolote, Mesa de La Simona, Mesa del Garabato, Rancho Huapoca, San Isidro, and San Juan de Enmedio and the Moris, Chihuahua settlements of Bermúdez, and Los Cien Pinos)
- Southern (spoken in the Ocampo, Chihuahua settlements of Basaseachi, Pinos Altos, Santo Domingo, Sapareachi, and Tierritas and the Temósachic, Chihuahua settlements of Agua Caliente, Casa Blanca, Ciénega Blanca, Cordón de Enmedio (Paraje Piedra Colorada), El Arbolito, El Llorón, El Nogal, El Saucito, El Terrero (Piedras Azules), Janos, La Ciénega, La Ciénega Blanca [Ciénega Blanca], La Guajolota, La Ornela, La Providencia, La Salitrera, La Vinata, Las Tierritas, Los Hornitos, Nabogame, Peñasco Blanco, Piedra Blanca, Piedras Azules, San Antonio, San Ignacio, Temósachic, Tierras de María, Yahuirachi, and Yepáchic
- Eastern (spoken in the Yécora, Sonora settlements of Arroyo Hondo Dos, Cañada Ancha (Ramón Lao), El Arroyo Hondo, El Carrizo, El Encinal, El Encinal Dos, El Kipur, El Tabaco, Juan Diego, La Cieneguita, La Dura, La Mesa, La Minita, Los Alisos I (Lupe Aguilar), Los Pilares, Los Vallecitos, Maycoba, Maycobita, Maycobita (José Galaviz), Mesa del Táscate, Pimas (Juan Diego de los Pimas), Tierra Panda, and Yécora
