= Pima Bajo =

Pima Bajo may refer to:

- Pima Bajo people, an ethnic group of Mexico
- Pima Bajo language, their language
