= Rubus sierrae =

Scientific classification
- Kingdom: Plantae
- Clade: Embryophytes
- Clade: Tracheophytes
- Clade: Spermatophytes
- Clade: Angiosperms
- Clade: Eudicots
- Clade: Rosids
- Order: Rosales
- Family: Rosaceae
- Genus: Rubus
- Species: R. sierrae

Binomial name
- Rubus sierrae Laferr.

Species of shrub

Rubus sierrae is a rare Mexican species of bramble. The plant has trifoliate leaves and solitary flowers. It is unusual in the genus in having distinctive serrate sepals. The species is named in memory of Dionisia Sierra Cruz (1985–87) of the village of Nabogame.

It is known from a single collection near Nabogame, Chihuahua, in the Sierra Madre Occidental approximately 18 kilometres (11 mi) northwest of Yepachic. The specimen was collected in riparian forest dominated by Acer grandidentatum Nutt. and Cupressus lusitanica.
