= Pectis pimana =

Scientific classification
- Kingdom: Plantae
- Clade: Tracheophytes
- Clade: Angiosperms
- Clade: Eudicots
- Clade: Asterids
- Order: Asterales
- Family: Asteraceae
- Genus: Pectis
- Species: P. pimana

Binomial name
- Pectis pimana Laferr. & D.J.Keil

Species of flowering plant

Pectis pimana is an herbaceous plant in the family Asteraceae. It is endemic to a mountainous area in the Sierra Madre Occidental, in the Mexican State of Chihuahua. Type locale is the village of Nabogame, 18 km northwest of Yepachic and about 10 km east of the state line with Sonora. Most of the inhabitants of Nabogame are of the indigenous ethnic group known as the Mountain Pima or Pima Bajo; the specific epithet "pimana" was chosen in their honor.
