= Laennecia pimana =

Scientific classification
- Kingdom: Plantae
- Clade: Tracheophytes
- Clade: Angiosperms
- Clade: Eudicots
- Clade: Asterids
- Order: Asterales
- Family: Asteraceae
- Genus: Laennecia
- Species: L. pimana

Binomial name
- Laennecia pimana G.L.Nesom & Laferr.

Species of flowering plant

Laennecia pimana is an herbaceous species from Mexico. The plant is known only from the type locale, i.e., the village of Nabogame, 18 km northwest of Yepachi, Chihuahua, at an elevation of approximately 1800 m in the Sierra Madre Occidental.

The species is a small, ascending herb with densely tomentose foliage.
