= Hymenocallis clivorum =

Scientific classification
- Kingdom: Plantae
- Clade: Tracheophytes
- Clade: Angiosperms
- Clade: Monocots
- Order: Asparagales
- Family: Amaryllidaceae
- Subfamily: Amaryllidoideae
- Genus: Hymenocallis
- Species: H. clivorum

Binomial name
- Hymenocallis clivorum Laferr.

Species of flowering plant

Hymenocallis clivorum is a member of the genus Hymenocallis, of the plant family Amaryllidaceae. It is native to the southern part of the Mexican state of Sonora.

== Description ==
Hymenocallis clivorum is a perennial herb producing bulbs about 6 cm long that resemble small onions. The leaves are narrow and sword-shaped, up to 35 cm long, very waxy on the surface. The flowering stalk is up to 45 cm tall, bearing an umbel of 8-11 flowers. The flowers are white with a white staminal cup (= membrane connecting the filaments) 18–21 mm high.

== Taxonomy ==
The species was first described in 1998 by Joseph E. Laferrière. The epithet "clivorum" means "of the slopes." The epithet is grammatically a genitive noun rather than an adjective, thus explaining the "-orum" ending despite the feminine generic name.

== Distribution and habitat ==
Many of the species of the genus grow in swamps and along streambanks in the warmer parts of the Western Hemisphere, especially in Mexico, the Caribbean and the southeastern United States. Only two other species are known from Sonora: H. pimana grows in grassy fields in the Sierra Madre Occidental along the line with Chihuahua; H. sonorensis along stream banks in southern Sonora and in Sinaloa. Hymenocallis clivorum, however, is found on hillsides in semi-arid brushlands.
