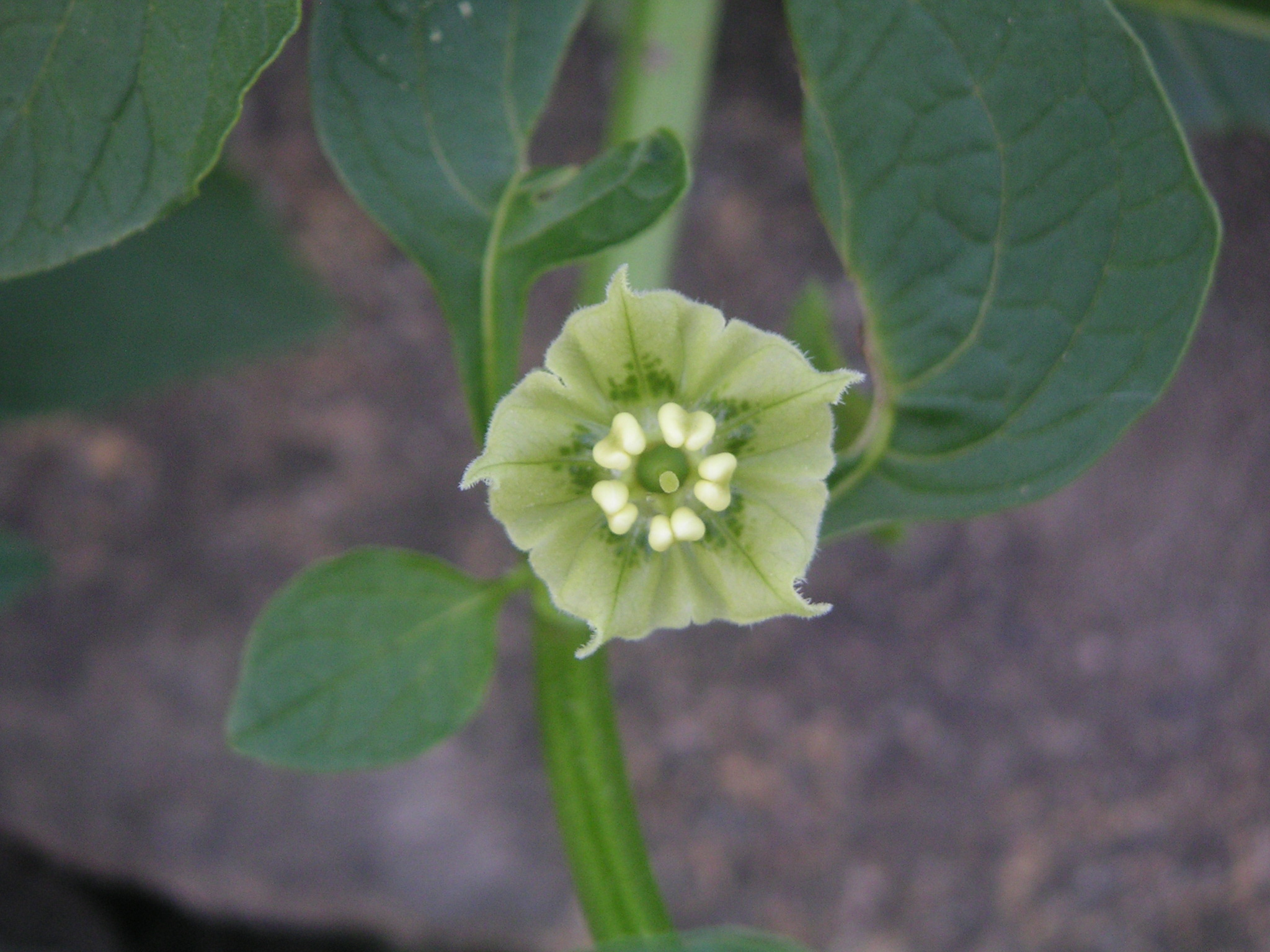
- Jaltomata procumbens flower

Conservation status
- Secure (NatureServe)

Scientific classification
- Kingdom: Plantae
- Clade: Tracheophytes
- Clade: Angiosperms
- Clade: Eudicots
- Clade: Asterids
- Order: Solanales
- Family: Solanaceae
- Genus: Jaltomata
- Species: J. procumbens

Binomial name
- Jaltomata procumbens (Cav.) J.L.Gentry

Synonyms
- Atropa procumbens Cav.; Bellinia contorta (Ruiz & Pav.) Roem. & Schult.; Bellinia procumbens (Cav.) Roem. & Schult.; Jaltomata edulis Schltdl.; Saracha allogona (Bernh. ex Schltdl.) Schltdl.; Saracha caracasana Bitter; Saracha diffusa Miers; Saracha edulis (Schltdl.) Thell.; Saracha jaltomata Schltdl.; Saracha laxa Miers; Saracha microsperma Bitter; Saracha miersii Dunal ex A. DC.; Saracha procumbens (Cav.) Ruiz & Pav.; Saracha procumbens var. pilosula C.V. Morton; Solanum allogonum Bernh. ex Schltdl.; Witheringia diffusa Miers; Witheringia procumbens (Cav.) Miers

= Jaltomata procumbens =

Species of fruit and plant

Jaltomata procumbens, the creeping false holly, is a plant species native to Arizona, USA, Mexico, Central America, Colombia, Ecuador, and Venezuela. It grows as a weed in agricultural fields and other disturbed locations, but in many places the people protect it because of the edible fruits it produces.

Jaltomata procumbens is a spreading, trailing to ascending herb forming many shoots from a single root. Leaves are broadly lanceolate, up to 20 cm long, dark green. Flowers are rotate, pale yellow-green with darker green spots toward the center. Berries are dark purple, spherical, about 1 cm in diameter, with a strong scent resembling that of grapes (Vitis spp.).

== Uses ==
The fruit has a pleasant taste and aroma and is prized as a food source by many peoples. The Tarahumara and Pima Bajo (Mountain Pima) peoples of the Sierra Madre Occidental of northwestern Mexico recognize the species when it grows in their agricultural fields, but protect it and encourage its growth. Many crop historians believe that many other species now recognized as crops began the process of domestication under similar circumstances, as volunteers in fields planted to other species.
