= Prionosciadium saraviki =

Saraviki

Scientific classification
- Kingdom: Plantae
- Clade: Tracheophytes
- Clade: Angiosperms
- Clade: Eudicots
- Clade: Asterids
- Order: Apiales
- Family: Apiaceae
- Genus: Prionosciadium
- Species: P. saraviki

Binomial name
- Prionosciadium saraviki Laferr.

Species of plant

Prionosciadium saraviki, common name saraviki, is a plant species in the genus Prionosciadium, in the carrot family, Apiaceae. It is known only from a mountainous region of the Sierra Madre Occidental in the Mexican State of Chihuahua. Type locale is the village of Nabogame, approximately 18 km northwest of Yepachic, Chihuahua, 10 km east of the border with Sonora. The plant grows there mostly along creekbanks and near springs.

Prionosciadium saraviki is a biennial producing a flowering stalk up to 2 m (7 feet) tall. It bears a compound umbel with hundreds of small yellow flowers. The taproot is up to 3 cm in diameter, white with a papery, copper-colored skin.

A few sources (e.g. The Plant List) have misspelled the epithet as "saravikii." This is an error because the epithet is the native name for the species, not honoring a person.

== Uses ==
The epithet "saraviki" is the local name for the plant as used by the Pima Bajo (= Mountain Pima) peoples of the region in which the plant is found. They sometimes eat the edible taproots. The roots and shoots have a pleasing aromatic scent.
