= Hymenocallis sonorensis =

Scientific classification
- Kingdom: Plantae
- Clade: Tracheophytes
- Clade: Angiosperms
- Clade: Monocots
- Order: Asparagales
- Family: Amaryllidaceae
- Subfamily: Amaryllidoideae
- Genus: Hymenocallis
- Species: H. sonorensis

Binomial name
- Hymenocallis sonorensis Standl.

Synonyms
- Hymenocallis sinaloaensis Traub

Species of flowering plant

Hymenocallis sonorensis is a species of plant in the family Amaryllidaceae, known from several locations in the southern part of the Mexican State of Sonora, as well as the neighboring States of Sinaloa and Nayarit.

Hymenocallis sonorensis is a bulb-forming perennial with showy white flowers. Two other species of the genus are found in Sonora, H. pimana and H. clivorum.
