= Berberis pimana =

Pima barberry

Scientific classification
- Kingdom: Plantae
- Clade: Tracheophytes
- Clade: Angiosperms
- Clade: Eudicots
- Order: Ranunculales
- Family: Berberidaceae
- Genus: Berberis
- Species: B. pimana

Binomial name
- Berberis pimana Laferr. & Marr.

Species of shrub

Berberis pimana is a species of the genus Berberis in the family Berberidaceae. It is native to a mountainous region of the Sierra Madre Occidental in the Mexican states of Chihuahua and Sonora.

Type locale for B. pimana is the village of Nabogame, 18 km northwest of Yepachic, Chihuahua. Nabogame is inhabited by people of the indigenous group known as the Mountain Pima or Pima Bajo. Berberis pimana grows in moist, shaded areas, mostly along streambanks. The people sometimes eat the sour-tasting berries.

Berberis pimana is a deciduous shrub up to 1.5 m tall, with compound leaves thinner than those of most evergreen species of the genus. It has red, ellipsoid berries each with several yellow or red seeds. It is related to Berberis moranensis Schult. & Schult.f.

The compound leaves place this species in the group sometimes segregated as the genus Mahonia.
