= Dennis Holt =

American poet, linguist and translator (born 1942)

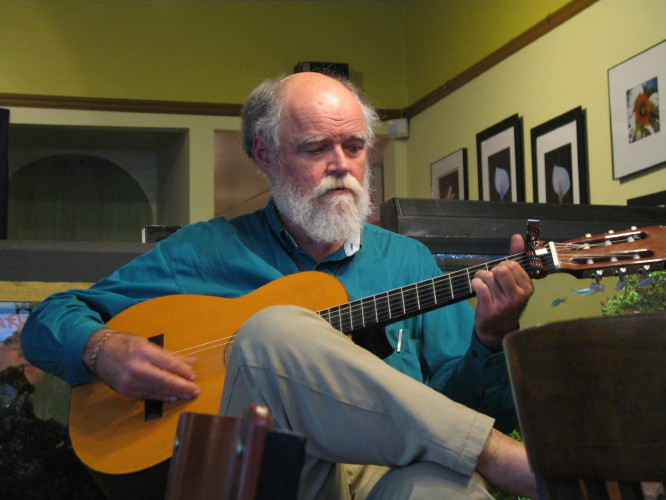
- Born: October 6, 1942 (age 83); Hollywood, Los Angeles, California, U.S.
- Education: University of California, Los Angeles (Ph.D., 1986)
- Occupations: Poet, linguist
- Years active: 1962-present
- Known for: Study of Native American languages of Central America and Mexico
- Spouse: Carleigh Hoff (1982-2002)
- Children: Leif Hoff-Holt

Dennis Graham Holt (born October 6, 1942) is an American poet, linguist and translator.

Born in Hollywood, Los Angeles, California, Holt graduated from Van Nuys High School in Los Angeles in 1960. Holt subsequently attended the California Institute of Technology, the University of California, Berkeley, and UCLA (where his graduate advisor was William Bright), receiving from the last of these four degrees in Linguistics (B.A. 1972, M.A. 1973, C.Phil. 1975, and Ph.D. 1986). From September 1966 until November 1969, he served in the Peace Corps in Bolivia, working with cooperative coffee-processing plants in the province of Nor Yungas, and later teaching English as a second language at the Instituto Anglo-Americano in Oruro.

Following his Peace Corps service, Holt returned to Los Angeles in 1970, where he soon became involved with the Venice Poetry Workshop at the Beyond Baroque Literary Arts Center in the Venice Beach District of the city, an association that continued throughout most of the decade of the 1970s. During the weekly gatherings of the workshop, Holt became friends with a number of the poets who were to be active in the Los Angeles poetry-scene throughout the following 40 years, including some of the poets whose works were collected in the workshop-based anthology Venice Thirteen (1972): Joseph Hansen and John Harris (the two directors of the workshop), Luis Campos, Harry Northup, and Barry Simons. Others included Steve Goldman, Milan Rastislav Šalka, Lynne Bronstein, Scott Wannberg, Leland Hickman, Jim Krusoe, Michael C. Ford, Paul Vangelisti, and Bill Mohr.

Holt published his first book of poetry, Windings, in 1973. Since 1978, Holt has produced and published occasional samizdat bardic broadsheets under various titles, including Some Bard's-Eye Views from Santa Cruz, Le Missoulambator, La Fogata Cruceña, The Quincunx, and others.

In 1979 Holt took up residence in Santa Cruz County, California, where he became active in local poetry events and published one issue of a literary-artistic journal, Onicnomachitocac, which included poetry, prose, & drawings by five others plus himself. During the period December 1979 to February 1980, Holt conducted field-work on the Tepecano and Huichol languages in northern Jalisco state, Mexico, concentrating primarily on the color-terminology of these languages. (Some of his findings are included in Robert MacLaury's book, Color and Cognition in Mesoamerica: Constructing Categories as Vantages)

In 1981 Holt returned to Los Angeles to work with his father on a television-project and there met and later married (in 1982) the artist and writer Carleigh M. Hoff (1950-2005). They soon moved from Los Angeles to Santa Barbara, where their son, Leif Hoff-Holt, was born later that year. In 1986, the family moved to Providence, Rhode Island; and in 1992 to East Hartford, and then, a year later, to Hamden, Connecticut. After 20 years, the marriage ended in divorce in 2002. Following a year in Missoula, Montana, in late 2003 Holt returned to Santa Cruz County, where he currently resides.

In addition to the dissemination of his own poems and translations through public readings and publication in journals and anthologies, Holt has been active as an impresario of poetry-readings and other literary events; and, for a total of five years, he produced a weekly poetry-hour, over radio-stations in Santa Barbara, California ("Damselflies & Hummingbird Pounds", KCSB, 1983–1986), and Bristol, Rhode Island ("Lingering in Deep Pools", WQRI, 1989–1992). With Dawne Anderson, Henry Gould, and others, he was one of the founders of the Poetry Mission in Providence, Rhode Island, in 1991, and subsequently served as treasurer of that organization, as well as co-editor, with Anderson, of its associated magazine, Northeast Journal (subsequently transmogrified into Nedge and edited by Gould).

Holt's linguistic research has primarily been directed toward the description of endangered languages of Latin America, including Pech, Tol, and Sumu of Honduras, and Tepecano and Sayula Popoluca of Mexico. In the 1970s, he began formulating a hypothesis that proposes a genetic relationship between the Uto-Aztecan and Chibchan language-families. This hypothesis has not yet been generally accepted among linguists. For 10 years, Holt served as secretary-treasurer of the Endangered Language Fund, from its founding, in 1996, until 2006; he also designed the logo of the organization, which, with some additional stylization, is still used.

As an educator, Holt has taught language-related courses at a number of institutions of higher learning in the U.S., including Southern Connecticut State University, Roger Williams University, Central Connecticut State University, Southeastern Massachusetts University (now the University of Massachusetts Dartmouth), Quinnipiac University, and the University of Montana. At the last of these he was suspended and ultimately fired for using his classroom podium as an opportunity to rant against the Iraq War and President George W. Bush during a linguistics-class on March 21, 2003. Following his dismissal from the university, Holt opened a bookstore and art-gallery in Missoula, Quetzalcoyotl Books & Art, which he operated for five months.

== Selected published works ==
=== Poetry ===
==== Books ====
- Windings: Poems & Fragments, 1962-1972. Venice, California: Privately published, 1973.
- Tanka Waka Uta: Explorations in Forms of Japanese Verse. Santa Barbara: Mudborn Press, 2015.

==== Journals ====
- "From a Sequoia Journal". Onicnomachitocac 1 (Fall 1979).
- "Last Chance". Forehead 2 (1990).
- "Yuki In Albuquerque". Fairfield Review, Summer 2000.
- "Deputizable Imputations del Riaje San Joaquín". Exquisite Corpse 10 (October 2000).

==== Anthologies ====
- Venice Thirteen. Venice, California: Bayrock Press, 1971.
- Linguistic Muse. Donna Jo Napoli and Emily Norwood Rando, eds. Carbondale, Illinois: Linguistic Research, 1979.
- Discovered Tongues: Poems by Linguists. William Bright, ed. San Francisco: Corvine Press, 1983.
- Meliglossa. Donna Jo Napoli and Emily Norwood Rando, eds. Edmonton, Alberta: Linguistic Research, 1983.
- Pedrada Zurda: 20 Años. Quito: Ediciones Pedrada Zurda, 1998.

==== Translations ====
- Poems by José Luis Quesada, trans. from the Spanish. Momentum 4 (Spring 1975).
- "Poemo Sayula Popoluca" by Panuncio Isidoro Rafael, trans. from the Sayula Popoluca. The Third Page, 2002.

==== Review ====
- "Two Poem-Collections by Native American Linguist Ofelia Zepeda", Endangered Language Fund Newsletter, 1999. Republished in Drunken Boat 3 (2001-2002).

=== Linguistics ===
==== Books ====
- The Development of the Paya Sound-System. Ph.D. dissertation, Department of Linguistics, University of California, Los Angeles, 1986.
- Tol (Jicaque). Languages of the World/Materials 170. Munich: LincomEuropa, 1999.
- Pech (Paya). Languages of the World/Materials 366. Munich: LincomEuropa, 1999.

==== Articles ====
- "La lengua paya y las fronteras lingüísticas de Mesoamérica" (with William Bright). Las fronteras de Mesoamérica: XIV Mesa Redonda, Tegucigalpa, Honduras, 23–28 de junio 1975, 1:149–56. México: Sociedad Mexicana de Antropología,1975.
- "Evidence of Genetic Relationship Between Chibchan and Uto-Aztecan." In K. Whistler et al., eds. Proceedings of the Third Annual Meeting of the Berkeley Linguistics Society: 283-92. Berkeley Linguistics Society, 1977.
- "On Paya Causatives." Estudios de Lingüística Chibcha 8:7-15. San José: Editorial de la Universidad de Costa Rica, 1989.
- "Another Look at Aztec-Chibchan." Estudios de Lingüística Chibcha 16:81-103. San José: Editorial de la Universidad de Costa Rica, 1997.

==== Reviews ====
- Vocabulario popoluca de Sayula: Veracruz, México. By Lawrence E. Clark. Language 74.2:338-40 (1998).
- Now I Know Only So Far: Essays in Ethnopoetics. By Dell Hymes, International Journal of American Linguistics, Vol. 71.2:233-5 (April 2005).
- Newe Hupia: Shoshoni Poetry Songs. By Beverly Crum, Earl Crum, & Jon P. Dayley. International Journal of American Linguistics, Vol. 71:3:361-2 (July 2005).
