= Prionosciadium =

Scientific classification
- Kingdom: Plantae
- Clade: Tracheophytes
- Clade: Angiosperms
- Clade: Eudicots
- Clade: Asterids
- Order: Apiales
- Family: Apiaceae
- Subfamily: Apioideae
- Tribe: Selineae
- Genus: Prionosciadium; S. Wats.

Type species
- Prionosciadium madrense S. Wats.

Genus of plants

Prionosciadium is a genus in the carrot family, Apiaceae. It is endemic to Mexico. The plants are biennial herbs with large taproots.

== Species ==
There are currently 14 described species in Prionosciadium:

- Prionosciadium bellii Mathias & Constance - Michoacán
- Prionosciadium cuneatum J.M.Coult. & Rose - Jalisco
- Prionosciadium diversifolium Rose - Guerrero
- Prionosciadium humile Rose - Nuevo León
- Prionosciadium lilacinum Mathias & Constance - Jalisco, Nayarit
- Prionosciadium linearifolium (S. Watson) J.M.Coult. & Rose - Puebla, Zacatecas
- Prionosciadium madrense S. Wats. - Chihuahua
- Prionosciadium megacarpum J.M.Coult. & Rose - Oaxaca
- Prionosciadium nelsonii J.M.Coult. & Rose - Morelos, Chiapas
- Prionosciadium saraviki Laferr. - Chihuahua
- Prionosciadium tamayoi Cuevas et N. M. Núñez - Jalisco
- Prionosciadium thapsoides (DC.) Mathias - Veracruz, Mexico State
- Prionosciadium townsendii Rose - Chihuahua
- Prionosciadium watsonii J.M.Coult. & Rose - Durango, Sinaloa, Oaxaca
