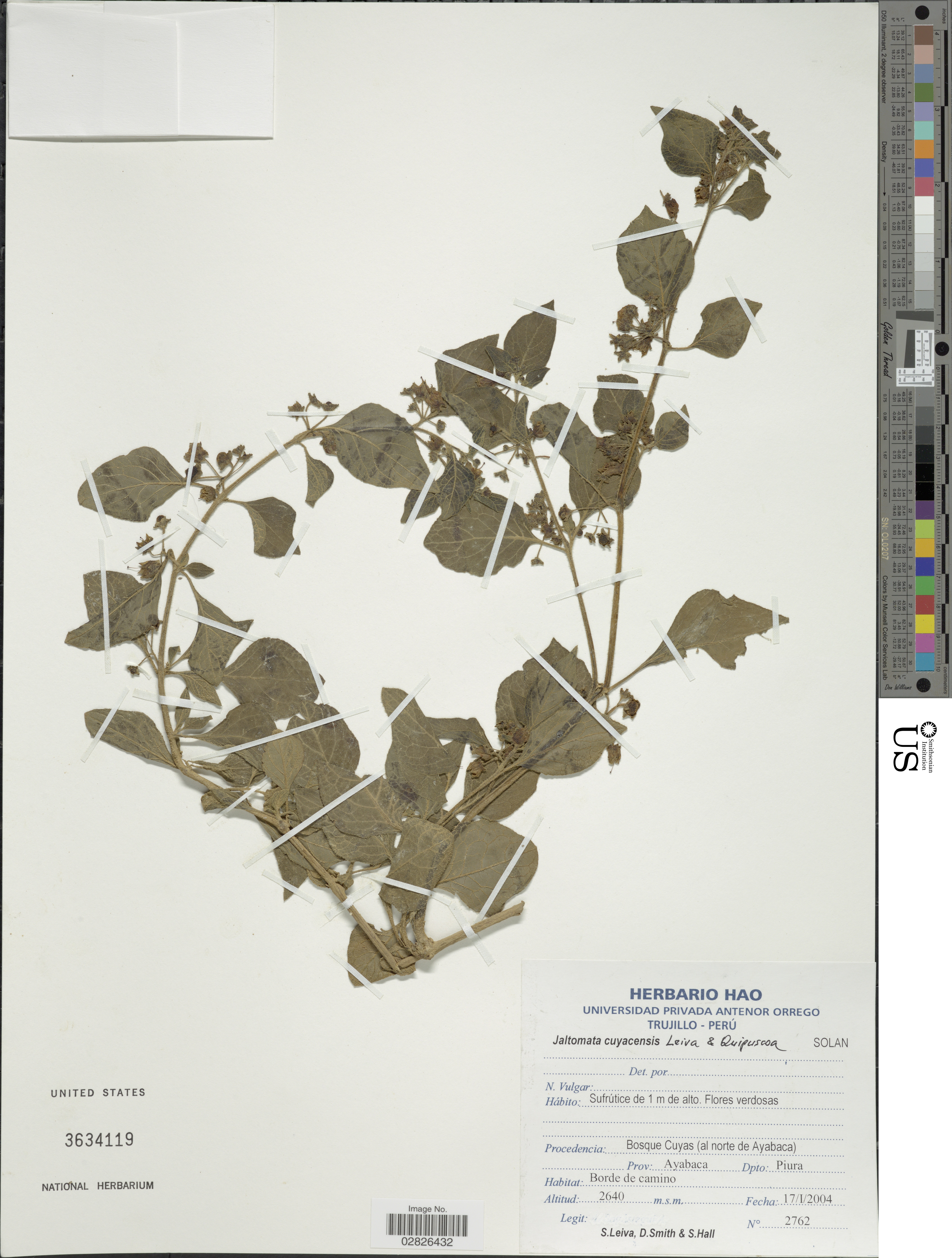

Scientific classification
- Kingdom: Plantae
- Clade: Tracheophytes
- Clade: Angiosperms
- Clade: Eudicots
- Clade: Asterids
- Order: Solanales
- Family: Solanaceae
- Genus: Jaltomata
- Species: J. cuyasensis

Binomial name
- Jaltomata cuyasensis S. Leiva & Mione

= Jaltomata cuyasensis =

Species of plant

Jaltomata cuyasensis is a plant species native to Peru. It grows on rocky hillsides at elevations less than 1800 m.

Jaltomata cuyasensis is a shrub up to 150 cm tall. Flowers are pale green with green and lavender markings. Fruits are bright orange at maturity.
