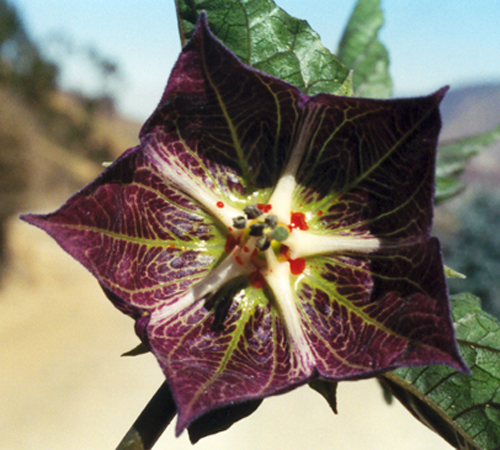

Scientific classification
- Kingdom: Plantae
- Clade: Tracheophytes
- Clade: Angiosperms
- Clade: Eudicots
- Clade: Asterids
- Order: Solanales
- Family: Solanaceae
- Genus: Jaltomata
- Species: J. weberbaueri

Binomial name
- Jaltomata weberbaueri (Dammer) Mione

Synonyms
- Saracha pallascana (Bitter) J.F. Macbr.; Saracha weberbaueri Dammer; Saracha weberbaueri subsp. pallascana Bitter

= Jaltomata weberbaueri =

Species of plant

Jaltomata weberbaueri is a plant species native to Peru. It grows on rocky hillsides at elevations less than 1800 m.

Jaltomata weberbaueri flowers are reddish-purple with white veins and red-orange nectar, up to 6 cm in diameter.
