= Temósachic =

Town in the Mexican state of Chihuahua

- Town
- Location in Mexico Temósachic (Mexico)
- Coordinates: 29°27′0″N 108°22′0″W
- Country: Mexico
- State: Chihuahua
- Municipality: Temósachi

Population (2005)
  - Total: 1,786
- Time zone: Mexican Central Time Zone

Temósachic is a town and seat of the municipality of Temósachic, in the northern Mexican state of Chihuahua. As of 2010, the town of Temósachic had a population of 1,841, up from 1,786 as of 2005.

== Geography ==
=== Climate ===
Climate data for Temósachic (1991–2020)
Month	Jan	Feb	Mar	Apr	May	Jun	Jul	Aug	Sep	Oct	Nov	Dec	Year
Record high °C (°F)	28.0 (82.4)	29.4 (84.9)	31.5 (88.7)	35.5 (95.9)	37.5 (99.5)	39.8 (103.6)	39.6 (103.3)	36.0 (96.8)	39.0 (102.2)	37.5 (99.5)	32.0 (89.6)	27.0 (80.6)	39.8 (103.6)
Mean daily maximum °C (°F)	17.0 (62.6)	19.1 (66.4)	21.9 (71.4)	25.1 (77.2)	29.0 (84.2)	32.2 (90.0)	29.9 (85.8)	28.8 (83.8)	27.7 (81.9)	25.1 (77.2)	20.9 (69.6)	17.0 (62.6)	24.5 (76.1)
Daily mean °C (°F)	6.1 (43.0)	8.2 (46.8)	10.5 (50.9)	13.5 (56.3)	17.1 (62.8)	21.6 (70.9)	21.9 (71.4)	21.2 (70.2)	19.3 (66.7)	14.8 (58.6)	9.7 (49.5)	6.0 (42.8)	14.2 (57.6)
Mean daily minimum °C (°F)	−4.8 (23.4)	−2.7 (27.1)	−0.9 (30.4)	1.9 (35.4)	5.2 (41.4)	11.0 (51.8)	13.9 (57.0)	13.6 (56.5)	10.8 (51.4)	4.4 (39.9)	−1.4 (29.5)	−5.0 (23.0)	3.8 (38.8)
Record low °C (°F)	−16.0 (3.2)	−21.0 (−5.8)	−13.0 (8.6)	−12.0 (10.4)	−10.0 (14.0)	1.0 (33.8)	1.6 (34.9)	6.0 (42.8)	−2.0 (28.4)	−8.0 (17.6)	−16.0 (3.2)	−17.4 (0.7)	−21.0 (−5.8)
Average precipitation mm (inches)	17.8 (0.70)	17.1 (0.67)	10.5 (0.41)	5.1 (0.20)	6.5 (0.26)	34.6 (1.36)	117.2 (4.61)	109.5 (4.31)	64.5 (2.54)	22.2 (0.87)	11.3 (0.44)	15.5 (0.61)	431.8 (17.00)
Average precipitation days (≥ 0.1 mm)	3.3	3.4	2.9	1.2	2.1	7.8	18.9	16.6	9.8	4.0	2.6	3.7	76.3
Average relative humidity (%)	71	67	61	57	51	54	69	74	71	67	68	71	65
Mean monthly sunshine hours	220	214	212	293	281	264	212	214	225	238	210	176	2,759
Source 1: Servicio Meteorologico Nacional (humidity 1981–2000)
Source 2: Deutscher Wetterdienst (sun, 1961–1990) (Note: Station ID for Temosachic is 76220 Use this station ID to locate the sunshine duration)
