= Prionosciadium linearifolium =

Scientific classification
- Kingdom: Plantae
- Clade: Tracheophytes
- Clade: Angiosperms
- Clade: Eudicots
- Clade: Asterids
- Order: Apiales
- Family: Apiaceae
- Genus: Prionosciadium
- Species: P. linearifolium

Binomial name
- Prionosciadium linearifolium (S.Watson) J.M.Coult. & Rose

Synonyms
- Cicuta linearifolium S.Watson

Species of plant

Prionosciadium linearifolium is a plant known from the Mexican states of Puebla and Zacatecas. It is a biennial herb with compound leaves with long linear leaflets.
