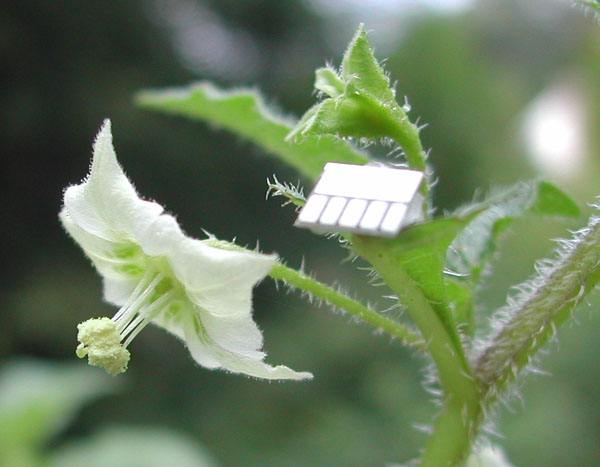

Scientific classification
- Kingdom: Plantae
- Clade: Embryophytes
- Clade: Tracheophytes
- Clade: Angiosperms
- Clade: Eudicots
- Clade: Asterids
- Order: Solanales
- Family: Solanaceae
- Genus: Jaltomata
- Species: J. chihuahuensis

Binomial name
- Jaltomata chihuahuensis (Bitter) Mione & Bye

Synonyms
- Saracha chihuahuensis Bitter

= Jaltomata chihuahuensis =

Species of flowering plant

Jaltomata chihuahuensis is a plant species native to the Mexican States of Chihuahua and Durango.

Jaltomata chihuahuensis is a prostrate, trailing herb with bristly shoots. Flowers are cream-colored with pale yellow-green markings. Fruits are light purple to green at maturity.
