= Piman languages =

Group of languages in the Uto-Aztecan family

Piman
- Tepiman
- Linguistic classification: Uto-Aztecan: Southern; Piman
- Subdivisions: Oʼodham; Pima Bajo / Oʼob; Tepehuan; Tepecano

Language codes
- Glottolog: tepi1240

Piman (or Tepiman) refers to a group of languages within the Uto-Aztecan family that are spoken by ethnic groups (including the Pima) spanning from Arizona in the north to Durango, Mexico in the south.

The Piman languages are as follows (Campbell 1997):

1. Oʼodham (also known as Pima language, Papago language)
2. Oʼob (also known as Mountain Pima, Lowland Pima)
3. Oʼotham (also known as Tepehuán proper, Southwestern Tepehuán, Southeastern Tepehuán)
4. Tepecano (†)

Linguistic evidence suggests that the various Piman languages split about a thousand years ago.

== Morphology ==
Piman languages are agglutinative, where words use suffix complexes for a variety of purposes with several morphemes strung together.
