= Tepecano language =

Extinct Indigenous language of Mexico

Tepecano
- Native to: Mexico
- Region: Jalisco
- Ethnicity: Tepecano
- Extinct: 1980s, with the death of Lino de la Rosa
- Language family: Uto-Aztecan: Piman (Tepiman); Tepecano

Language codes
- ISO 639-3: tep
- Glottolog: tepe1278
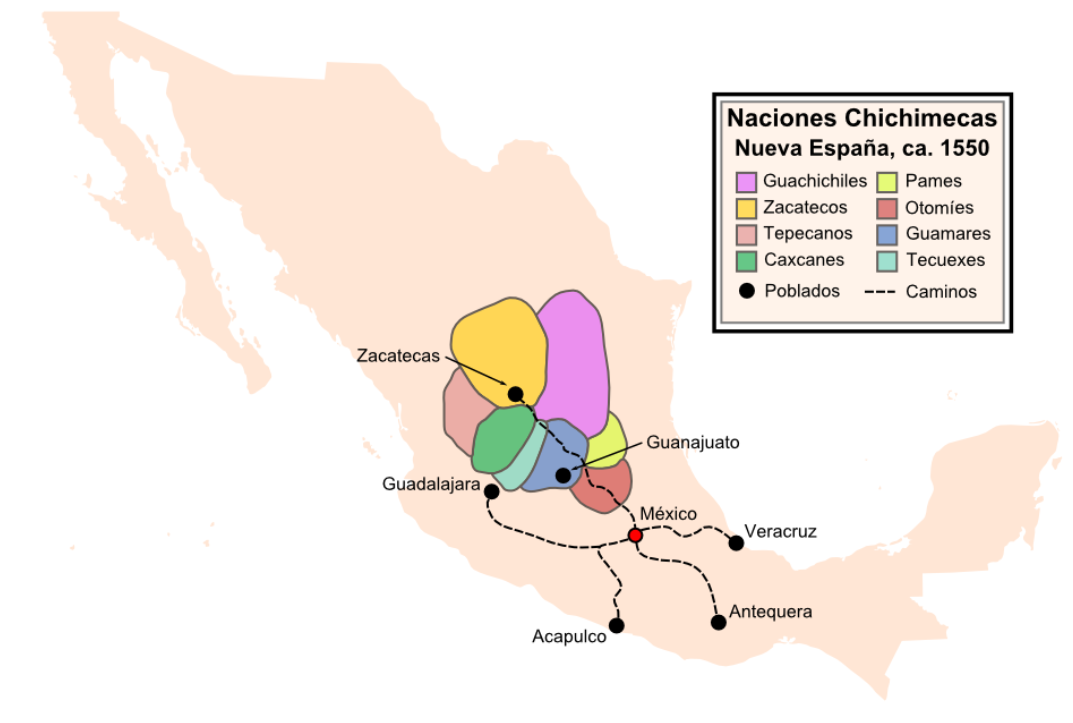
- Map of Tepecano and neighboring Chichimeca nations during the 16th century

The Tepecano language is an extinct Indigenous language of Mexico belonging to the Uto-Aztecan language family. It was formerly spoken by a small group of people in Azqueltán (earlier Atzqueltlán), Jalisco, a small village on the Río Bolaños in the far northern part of the state, just east of the territory of the Wixárika people. Most closely related to Southern Tepehuán of the state of Durango, Tepecano was a Mesoamerican language and evinced many of the traits that define the Mesoamerican Linguistic Area. As far as is known, the last speaker of Tepecano was Lino de la Rosa (born September 22, 1895), who was still living as of February 1980.

Research on Tepecano was first carried out by the American linguistic anthropologist John Alden Mason in Azqueltán from 1911 to 1913. This work led to the publication of a monographic grammatical sketch in 1916 as well as an article on native prayers in Tepecano that Mason had collected from informants in 1918. Later, American linguist Dennis Holt conducted field research in 1965 and from 1979 to 1980, but his results have not yet been published.

== Morphology ==
Tepecano is an agglutinative language, where words use suffix complexes for a variety of purposes with several morphemes strung together.

== Bibliography ==
- Campbell, Lyle (1997). American Indian Languages: The Historical Linguistics of Native America. Oxford Studies in Anthropological Linguistics, no. 4. William Bright (series general ed.) (OUP paperback [2000] ed.). New York: Oxford University Press. ISBN 0-19-509427-1. OCLC 32923907.
- Holt, Dennis (Spring 2001). "Valedictory: Lino de la Rosa" (PDF online facsimile). Ogmios Newsletter. 2.4 (16). Bath, England: Foundation for Endangered Languages: 30. ISSN 1471-0382. OCLC 223025309.
- Mason, J. Alden (June 1916). "Tepecano, a Piman Language of Western Mexico" (digitized reproduction online at Internet Archive). Annals of the New York Academy of Sciences. 25 (2). New York: the Academy: 309–416. Bibcode:1916NYASA..25..309M. doi:10.1111/j.1749-6632.1916.tb55171.x. hdl:2027/iau.31858003180399. ISSN 0077-8923. OCLC 1946633. S2CID 86778121.
- Mason, J. Alden (May 1918). "Tepecano Prayers" (digitized reproduction online at Wikisource). International Journal of American Linguistics. 1 (2). New York: Douglas C. McMurtrie: 91–153. doi:10.1086/463718. ISSN 0020-7071. OCLC 31838203. S2CID 224808597.
