= Prionosciadium lilacinum =

Scientific classification
- Kingdom: Plantae
- Clade: Tracheophytes
- Clade: Angiosperms
- Clade: Eudicots
- Clade: Asterids
- Order: Apiales
- Family: Apiaceae
- Genus: Prionosciadium
- Species: P. lilacinum

Binomial name
- Prionosciadium lilacinum Mathias & Constance

Species of plant

Prionosciadium lilacinum is a plant species native to the Mexican States of Jalisco and Nayarit. It is common along sunlit roadsides and other disturbed habitats in the region.

Prionosciadium lilacinum is an herb up to 4 m (13 feet) tall. Leaves are up to 35 cm (14 inches) long and 35 cm across, ternate to pinnate with ovate leaflets. Flower are light purple, borne in umbels on the ends of branches. Fruits are ovoid, up to 9 mm (0.35 inches) long.
