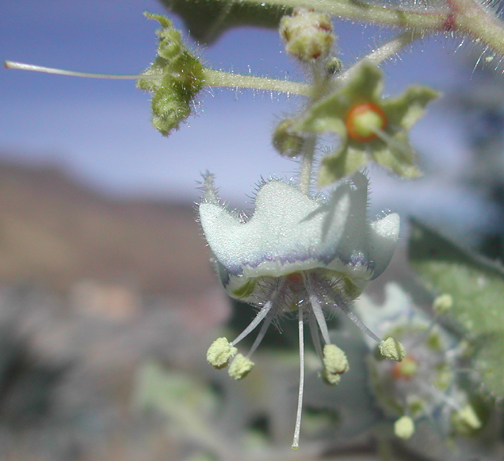

Scientific classification
- Kingdom: Plantae
- Clade: Tracheophytes
- Clade: Angiosperms
- Clade: Eudicots
- Clade: Asterids
- Order: Solanales
- Family: Solanaceae
- Genus: Jaltomata
- Species: J. cajacayensis

Binomial name
- Jaltomata cajacayensis Mione 2000

= Jaltomata cajacayensis =

Species of plant

Jaltomata cajacayensis (also called musho in Quechua) is a plant species native to Peru. The name comes from the Cajacay District, where it was recognized by Mione as a new species.

Jaltomata cajacayensis is a perennial shrub that grows up to 1.1 m in height. The flowers are whitish-green, and the fruits are berries, orange at maturity, round and 5–9 mm in diameter. They are sweet and eaten raw by local people, who do not cultivate them but let them grow by the agricultural fields. Leaves and flowers are used in Peru to make a tea used for stomach ache, diarrhea and menstrual cycle regulation.
