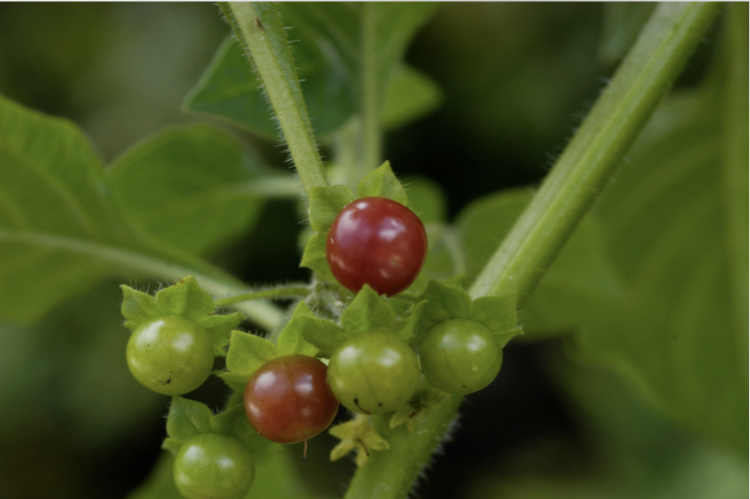

Scientific classification
- Kingdom: Plantae
- Clade: Tracheophytes
- Clade: Angiosperms
- Clade: Eudicots
- Clade: Asterids
- Order: Solanales
- Family: Solanaceae
- Genus: Jaltomata
- Species: J. antillana

Binomial name
- Jaltomata antillana (Krug & Urb.) D'Arcy

Synonyms
- Saracha antillana Krug & Urb.

= Jaltomata antillana =

Species of flowering plant

Jaltomata antillana, the Antilles false holly, is a plant species native to Jamaica, the Dominican Republic, Haiti, Cuba and Puerto Rico.

Jaltomata antillana is an herb up to 100 cm (39 inches) tall. Flowers are white to cream colored. Fruits deep blood red, about 10 mm in diameter.
