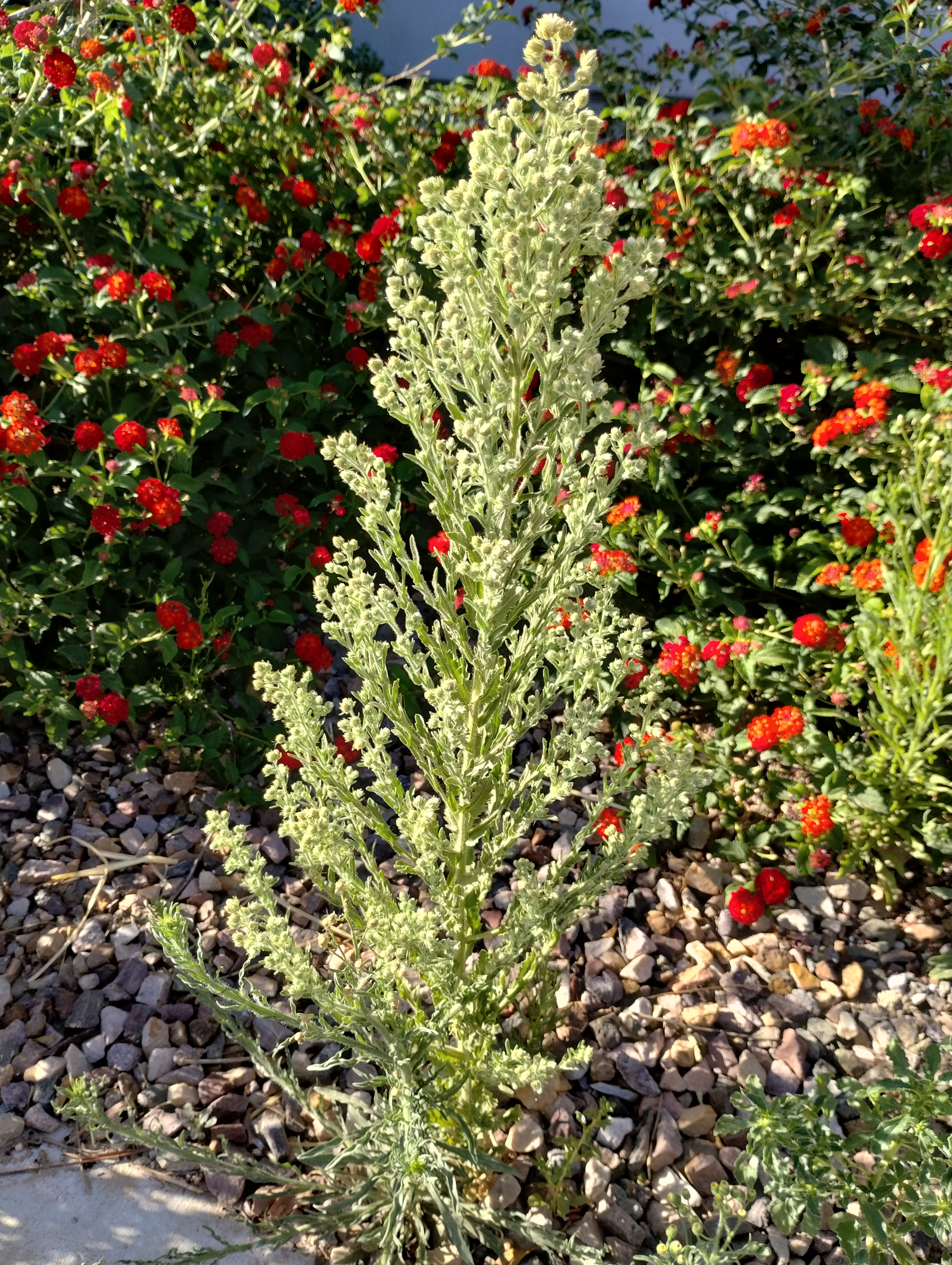
- Laennecia coulteri

Scientific classification
- Kingdom: Plantae
- Clade: Tracheophytes
- Clade: Angiosperms
- Clade: Eudicots
- Clade: Asterids
- Order: Asterales
- Family: Asteraceae
- Subfamily: Asteroideae
- Tribe: Astereae
- Subtribe: Baccharidinae
- Genus: Laennecia; Cass.

Synonyms
- Laënnecia Cass., spelling variant, see also; Conyza sect. Laennecia (Cass.) Cuatrec.

= Laennecia =

Genus of flowering plants

Laennecia or Laënnecia is a genus of flowering plants in the family Asteraceae. The plants are native to Mesoamerica, South America, and the southwestern United States. Common name is "horseweed."

Species

- Laennecia altoandina (Cabrera) G.L.Nesom - Jujuy in Argentina, La Paz in Bolivia, Cusco in Peru
- Laennecia araneosa (Urb.) G.Sancho & Pruski - Dominican Republic
- Laennecia artemisiifolia (Meyen & Walp.) G.L.Nesom
- Laennecia chihuahuana G.L.Nesom - Chihuahua
- Laennecia confusa (Cronquist) G.L.Nesom - Chiapas, Guatemala, Costa Rica
- Laennecia coulteri (A.Gray) G.L.Nesom - Mexico (Coahuila, Nuevo León, Sonora), United States (CA NV AZ UT CO NM TX AL)
- Laennecia eriophylla (A.Gray) G.L.Nesom - Arizona (Pima, Santa Cruz, Cochise Counties)
- Laennecia filaginoides DC. - Central America, Colombia, Ecuador, Venezuela, Mexico, Texas
- Laennecia gnaphalioides (Kunth) Cass. - Chiapas, Oaxaca, Central America, Colombia, Ecuador, Peru, Bolivia, Venezuela
- Laennecia microglossa (S.F.Blake) G.L.Nesom - Nuevo León
- Laennecia pimana G.L.Nesom & Laferr. - Chihuahua
- Laennecia schiedeana (Less.) G.L.Nesom - Central America, Mexico, USA (AZ CO NM)
- Laennecia sophiifolia (Kunth) G.L.Nesom - South America, Mesoamerica, USA (AZ TX NM)
- Laennecia spellenbergii G.L.Nesom - Durango
- Laennecia turnerorum G.L.Nesom - Texas (Brewster County)
