= Prionosciadium nelsonii =

Scientific classification
- Kingdom: Plantae
- Clade: Tracheophytes
- Clade: Angiosperms
- Clade: Eudicots
- Clade: Asterids
- Order: Apiales
- Family: Apiaceae
- Genus: Prionosciadium
- Species: P. nelsonii

Binomial name
- Prionosciadium nelsonii Coult. & Rose

Synonyms
- Langlassea eriocarpa H.Wolff

Species of plant

Prionosciadium nelsonii is a plant species known from the Mexican states of Chiapas and Morelos. It is a biennial herb with a large taproot. Leaves are compound with narrowly lanceolate leaflets, some of them with narrow, tapering lobes. The inflorescence is a compound umbel at the top of the stem.
