= Prionosciadium thapsoides =

Scientific classification
- Kingdom: Plantae
- Clade: Tracheophytes
- Clade: Angiosperms
- Clade: Eudicots
- Clade: Asterids
- Order: Apiales
- Family: Apiaceae
- Genus: Prionosciadium
- Species: P. thapsoides

Binomial name
- Prionosciadium thapsoides (DC.) Mathias

Synonyms
- Elaeoselinum thapsoides DC.; Angelica mexicana Vatke; Prionosciadium mexicanum (Vatke) S. Wats.; Prionosciadium seleri Rose

Species of plant

Prionosciadium thapsoides is a plant species native to the Mexican states of Veracruz and Mexico, as well as Guatemala.

Prionosciadium thapsoides is a biennial herb with a large taproot. Leaves are bipinnately compound, the leaflets pinnately lobed with broad obovate lobes. Flowers are white, borne in dense compound umbels at the top of the flowering stalk.

Chemical studies have revealed the existence of several new dihydrofurochromones in the roots.
