= Prionosciadium humile =

Scientific classification
- Kingdom: Plantae
- Clade: Tracheophytes
- Clade: Angiosperms
- Clade: Eudicots
- Clade: Asterids
- Order: Apiales
- Family: Apiaceae
- Genus: Prionosciadium
- Species: P. humile

Binomial name
- Prionosciadium humile Rose

Synonyms
- Peucedanum madrense S. Wats. 1890. [not Prionosciadium madrense S. Wats. 1888]

Species of plant

Prionosciadium humile is a species native to the Mexican state of Nuevo León. It is a biennial herb with trifoliate leaves, each leaflet palmately 3-lobed and almost cleft.
