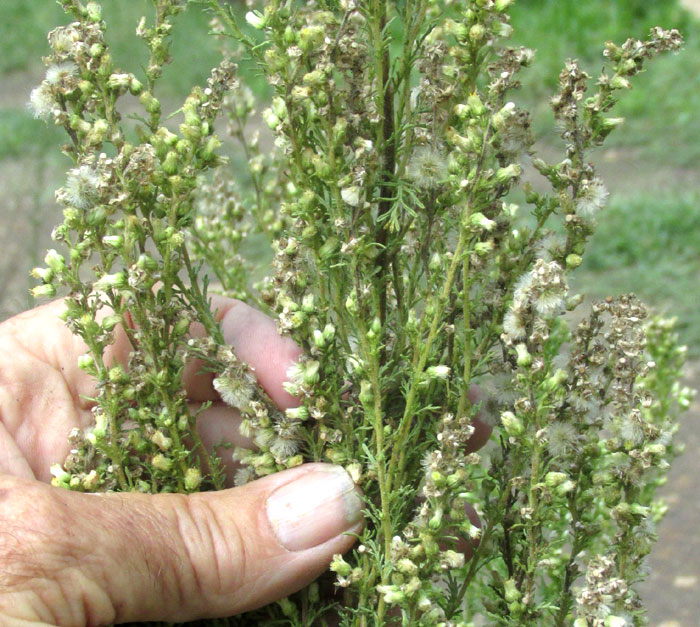
- Laennecia sophiifolia inflorescence

Scientific classification
- Kingdom: Plantae
- Clade: Embryophytes
- Clade: Tracheophytes
- Clade: Spermatophytes
- Clade: Angiosperms
- Clade: Eudicots
- Clade: Asterids
- Order: Asterales
- Family: Asteraceae
- Genus: Laennecia
- Species: L. sophiifolia

Binomial name
- Laennecia sophiifolia (Kunth) G.L.Nesom

Synonyms
- List: Achaetogeron sophiifolius (Kunth) Larsen; Conyza sophiifolia Kunth; Dimorphanthes sophiifolia (Kunth) Cass.; Marsea sophiifolia (Kunth) Kuntze; Conyza coulteri var. tenuisecta A.Gray; Conyza pulchella Kunth; Conyza serpentaria Griseb.; Dimorphanthes pulchella (Kunth) Cass.; Eschenbachia tenuisecta (A.Gray) Wooton & Standl.; Musteron pulchellum (Kunth) Raf.

= Laennecia sophiifolia =

Species of plant

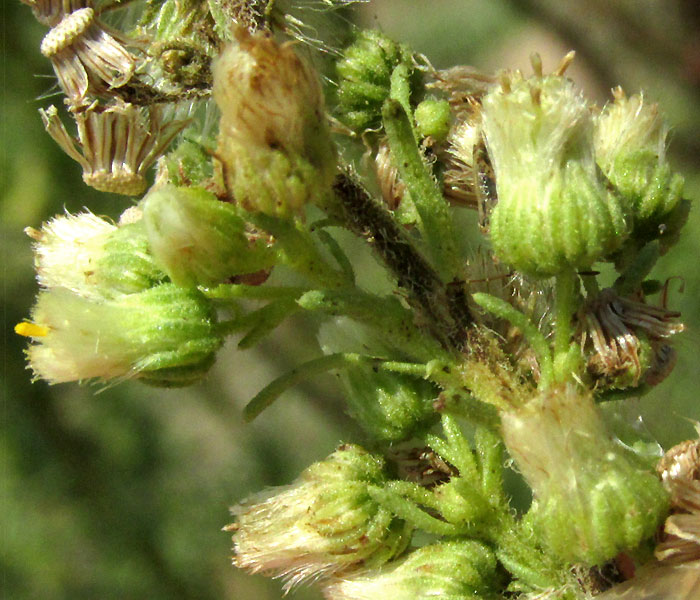
Floral heads

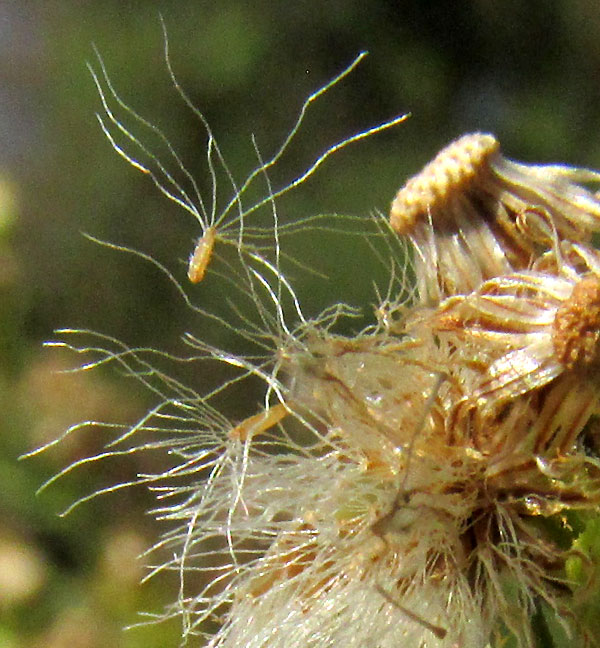
Cypselae with pappuses

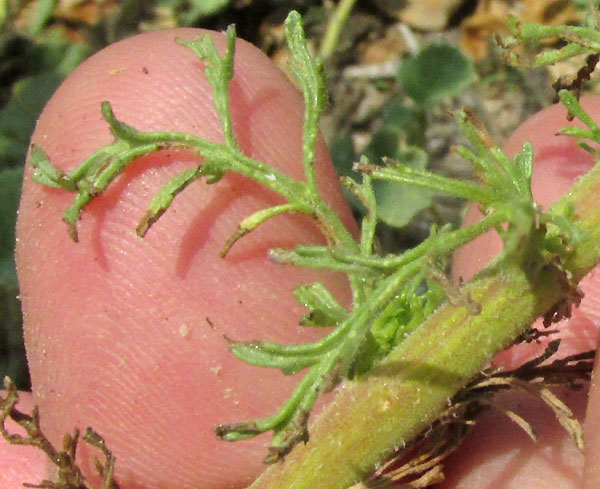
Deeply divided leaves

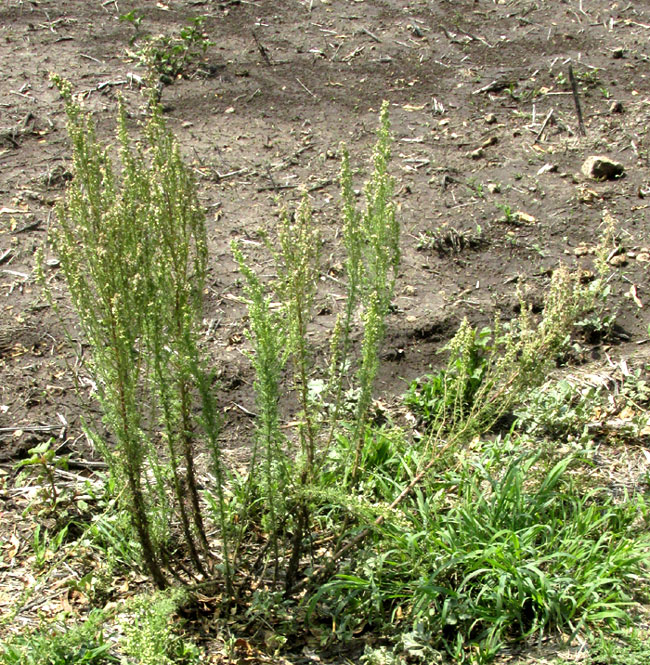
Plant in habitat

Laennecia sophiifolia, commonly known as leafy horseweed, is a species of annual plant native to the New World, belonging to the family Asteraceae.

== Description ==
Leafy horseweed is similar to many other members of the aster family producing very many small, closely grouped floral heads. Here are some notable features distinguishing the species from similar ones:

- Stems up to 1.5 m (4 ft 11 in) tall and sometimes higher may be branched from the bases.
- Leaves are once or twice divided into slender to very sender lobes, though upper ones may appear to be simple slender blades. Overall blade shape varies considerably, reaching 50 mm (2 in) and more in length, and to about 20 mm (3/4 in) wide. Both sides of the leaf are variously hairy, at least on the margins, accompanied by tiny glands which may be stalked or not.
- Floral heads are borne in branched, more-or-less corymb-type arrays on the main stem and side branches, causing the whole branched stem to look like a slender, congested mixture of floral heads and leaves. Individual florets within the heads number up to 40. Though most lack stamens, they all have pistils and produce fruits.
- One-seeded, cypsela-type 'fruits' are pale pinkish tan and up to 0.8 mm (1/32 in) long. Atop each cypsela arises a fragile pappus which readily falls off and consists of up to 20 white to tawny bristles up to 3 mm (1/8 in) long.

== Distribution ==
Leafy horseweed occurs in widely disjunct populations in the Americas. In the USA it is native to the southwestern states of Arizona, New Mexico and Texas. In Mexico it occurs nearly throughout, while in Central America it is limited to Guatemala, El Salvador and Honduras. In South America, it appears in Colombia, Venezuela, and farther south in Ecuador, Bolivia and Argentina.

== Habitat ==
In the USA, leafy horseweed is found in disturbed sites and among igneous rocks at 1,300–2,100 m (4,300–6,900 ft) in elevation.. In Mexico it prefers semi-arid areas and disturbed, weedy places such as roadsides and abandoned or fallow fields. Sometimes it is encountered in pine–oak forests. In Argentina it is found in open, disturbed soils between 300–2,200 m (980–7,220 ft).

== In traditional medicine ==
In Argentina many medicinal uses have been documented for leafy horseweed, including as a diuretic, to counteract the effects of poison, venom and infection, and against rheumatism and rabies.

== Taxonomy ==
In 1818 when Carl Sigismund Kunth formally named and described Laennecia sophiifolia under the name Conyza sophiifolia, he was referencing a collection made by Alexander von Humboldt and Aimé Bonpland during their American Expedition of 1799–1804. He noted that the plant was collected "... inter Chalco et lacum Tezcucensem," understood to be between Chalco and Lake Texcoco, where Mexico City now stands. The "Tezcucensem" is the adjective form of the Third Declension of the Latinized Tezcuco, that name being an older one for Texcoco.

In 1990 Guy L. Nesom transferred 15 species from the genus Conyza into his newly erected genus Laennecia, assigning the new taxon Laennecia sophiifolia to his section Sophiifolium, along with two Andean South America species and a North American one. In this subsection, only Laennecia sophiifolia was widespread, though notably absent from most of Central America.

=== Etymology ===
The genus name Laennecia, sometimes written Laënnecia, honors René-Théophile-Hyacinthe Laënnec.

The species name sophiifolia is a New Latin compound with the ending -folio deriving from Latin folio, a form of folium, meaning "leaf." In sophiifolia, the suffix folia means "a leaf like Sophia," with Sophia being a genus name proposed in 1763, but which was rejected, and now is regarded as a synonym of the genus Descurainia. That genus, though in the Mustard Family, incorporates species known as tansymustards. The type species of Sophia was a plant now known as Descurainia sophia, whose leaves are quite similar to Laennecia sophiifolia.
