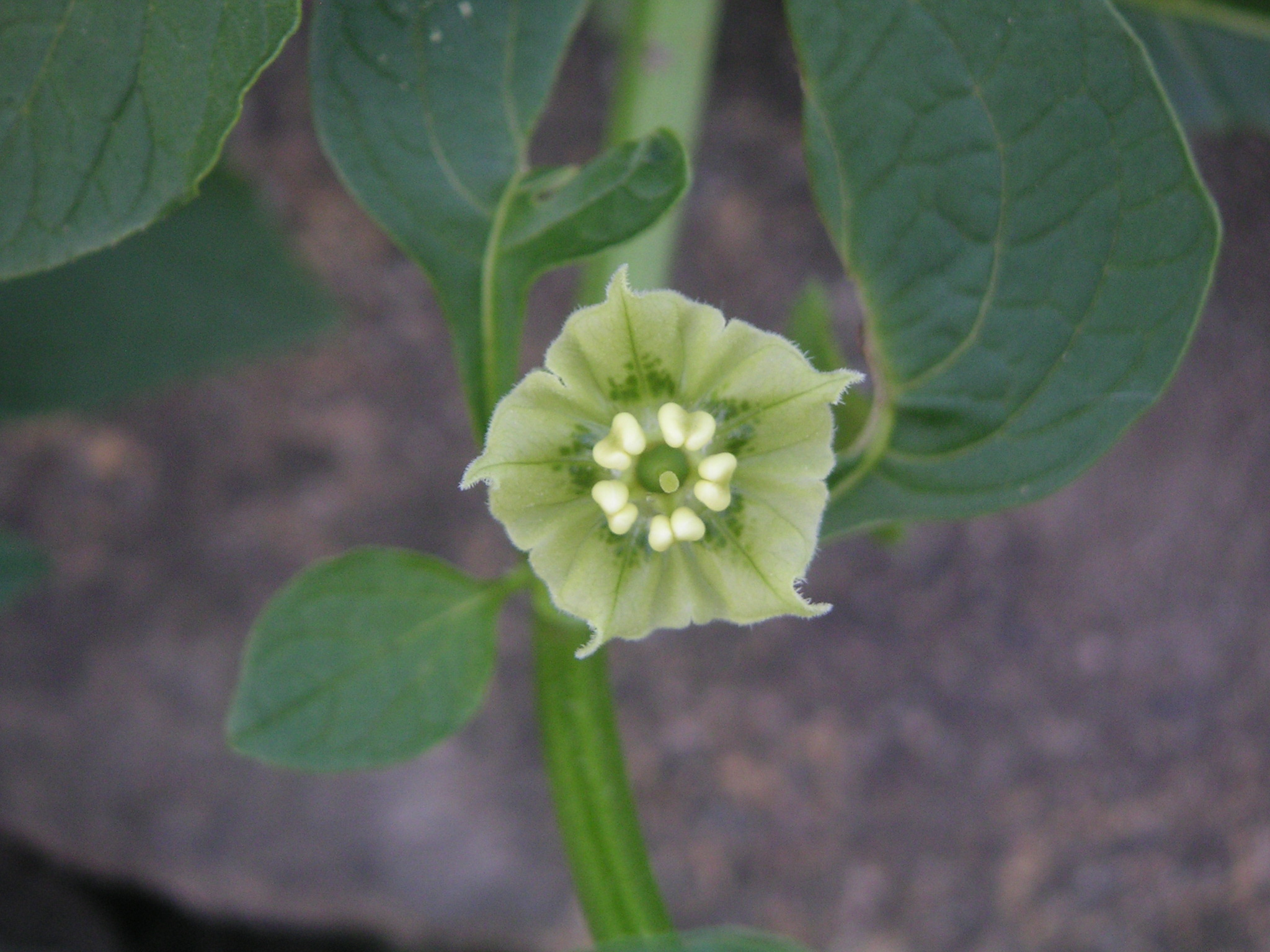
- Jaltomata procumbens flower

Scientific classification
- Kingdom: Plantae
- Clade: Tracheophytes
- Clade: Angiosperms
- Clade: Eudicots
- Clade: Asterids
- Order: Solanales
- Family: Solanaceae
- Subfamily: Solanoideae
- Tribe: Solaneae
- Genus: Jaltomata; Schltdl.

= Jaltomata =

Genus of flowering plants

Jaltomata is a genus of plants in the family Solanaceae. According to molecular phylogenies, Jaltomata is the sister genus to Solanum, which includes tomato, potato, and eggplant. Jaltomata has a neotropical distribution, in that species occur from the United States southwest through Latin America, and into the Andean region of South America. Species encompass a wide range of vegetative and reproductive trait variation, including growth habit (trailing herbs, erect herbs, and woody shrubs), floral size, shape and color, as well as fruit size and color. The fruits of some of the species are eaten by humans in Latin and South America. Depending on the species, fruits may be red, green, orange, or dark purple.

== Etymology ==
The name comes from xāltomatl, lit. "sand tomato", the Nahuatl (Aztec) name for the species Jaltomata procumbens (earlier Saracha jaltomata). The Nahuatl X is pronounced like an English SH, but when borrowed into Mexican Spanish and spelled J, the pronunciation is like an English H. Both Mexican and US American botanists pronounce the J this way.

== Species ==
Currently accepted species:

- Jaltomata andersonii T. Mione
- Jaltomata antillana (Krug & Urb.) D'Arcy
- Jaltomata aspera (Ruiz & Pav.) T. Mione & F. G. Coe
- Jaltomata atiquipa Mione & S. Leiva G.
- Jaltomata auriculata (Miers) Mione
- Jaltomata aypatensis S. Leiva, Mione & Quipuscoa
- Jaltomata bernardelloana S. Leiva & Mione
- Jaltomata bicolor (Ruiz & Pav.) Mione
- Jaltomata biflora (Ruiz & Pav.) Benítez
- Jaltomata bohsiana Mione & D.M. Spooner
- Jaltomata cajacayensis S. Leiva & T. Mione
- Jaltomata cajamarca T. Mione
- Jaltomata calliantha S. Leiva & T. Mione
- Jaltomata chihuahuensis (Bitter) Mione & Bye
- Jaltomata confinis (C.V. Morton) J.L. Gentry
- Jaltomata contorta (Ruiz & Pav.) Mione
- Jaltomata cuyasensis S. Leiva, Quipuscoa & Sawyer
- Jaltomata dendroidea S. Leiva & Mione
- Jaltomata dentata (Ruiz & Pav.) Benitez
- Jaltomata diversa (J.F. Macbr.) Mione
- Jaltomata grandiflora (B.L. Rob. & Greenm.) D'Arcy, Mione & Davis
- Jaltomata grandibaccata S. Leiva & Mione
- Jaltomata herrerae (C.V. Morton) Mione
- Jaltomata incahuasina Mione & S. Leiva
- Jaltomata leivae Mione
- Jaltomata lezamae S. Leiva & Mione
- Jaltomata lojae Mione
- Jaltomata mionei S. Leiva & Quipuscoa
- Jaltomata neei Mione & S. Leiva
- Jaltomata nigricolor S. Leiva & Mione
- Jaltomata nitida (Bitter) Mione
- Jaltomata paneroi Mione & S. Leiva
- Jaltomata procumbens (Cav.) J.L.Gentry
- Jaltomata propinqua (Miers) Mione & M. Nee
- Jaltomata quipuscoae Mione & S. Leiva
- Jaltomata repandidentata (Dunal) Hunz.
- Jaltomata sagastegui Mione
- Jaltomata salpoensis S. Leiva & Mione
- Jaltomata sanctae-martae Benitez
- Jaltomata sinuosa (Miers) Mione
- Jaltomata umbellata (Ruiz & Pav.) Mione & M. Nee
- Jaltomata ventricosa (Baker) Mione
- Jaltomata viridiflora (Kunth) M. Nee & Mione
- Jaltomata weberbaueri (Dammer) T. Mione & F. G. Coe
- Jaltomata werffii D'Arcy
- Jaltomata yacheri Mione & S. Leiva
- Jaltomata yungayensis Mione & S. Leiva
