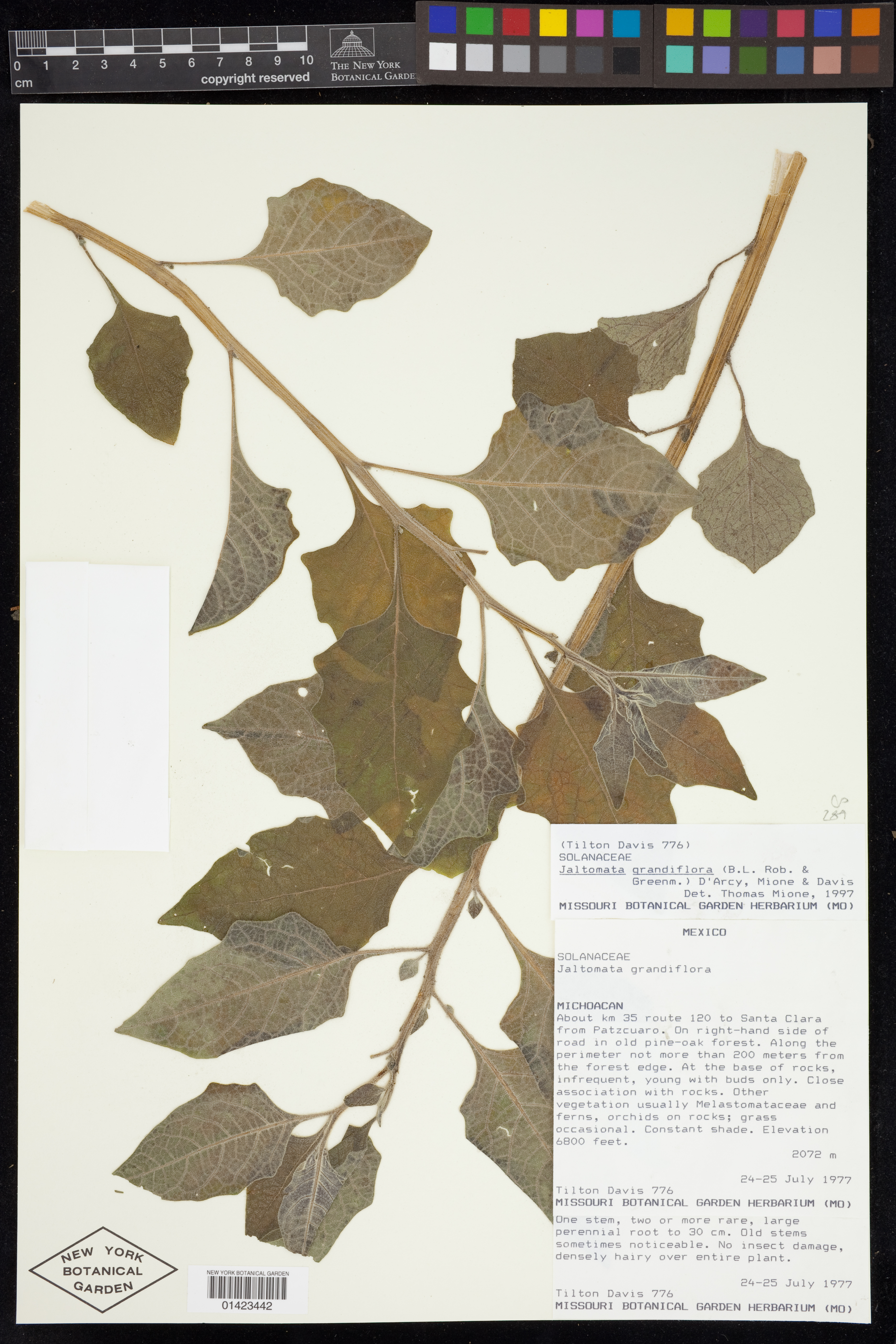

Scientific classification
- Kingdom: Plantae
- Clade: Tracheophytes
- Clade: Angiosperms
- Clade: Eudicots
- Clade: Asterids
- Order: Solanales
- Family: Solanaceae
- Genus: Jaltomata
- Species: J. grandiflora

Binomial name
- Jaltomata grandiflora (B.L. Rob. & Greenm.) D'Arcy, Mione & Davis

Synonyms
- Saracha grandiflora B.L. Rob. & Greenm.

= Jaltomata grandiflora =

Species of shrub

Jaltomata grandiflora is a rare plant species native to the Mexican State of Michoacán.

Jaltomata grandiflora is a perennial herb to subshrub, up to 100 cm tall. Flowers are white to pale green with darker green spots and uncolored nectar. Fruits at maturity are pale purple.
