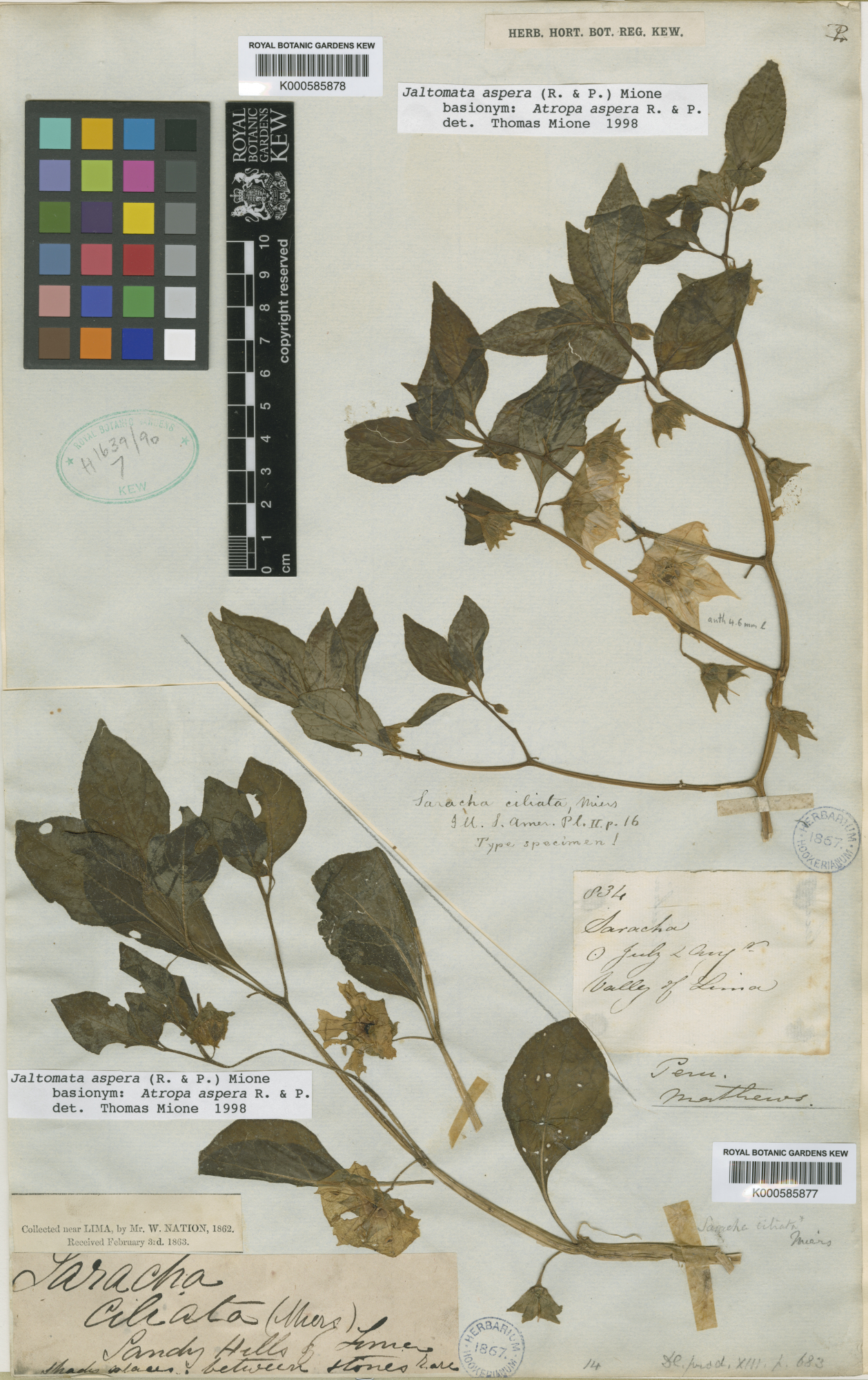

Scientific classification
- Kingdom: Plantae
- Clade: Tracheophytes
- Clade: Angiosperms
- Clade: Eudicots
- Clade: Asterids
- Order: Solanales
- Family: Solanaceae
- Genus: Jaltomata
- Species: J. aspera

Binomial name
- Jaltomata aspera (Ruiz & Pav.) Mione

Synonyms
- Atropa aspera Ruiz & Pav.; Hebecladus asperus (Ruiz & Pav.) Miers; Saracha ciliata Miers; Saracha lacrima-virginis Bitter; Saracha urbaniana Bitter & Dammer; Ulticona aspera (Ruiz & Pav.) Raf.; Witheringia ciliata (Miers) Miers

= Jaltomata aspera =

Species of plant

Jaltomata aspera is a species of flowering plant in the family Solanaceae. It is native to Peru where it grows on rocky hillsides at elevations less than 1800 m.

Jaltomata aspera is a shrub up to 2 m tall. It has solitary, hanging flowers, greenish-yellow in color with blood-red nectar. Fruits are orange to white.
