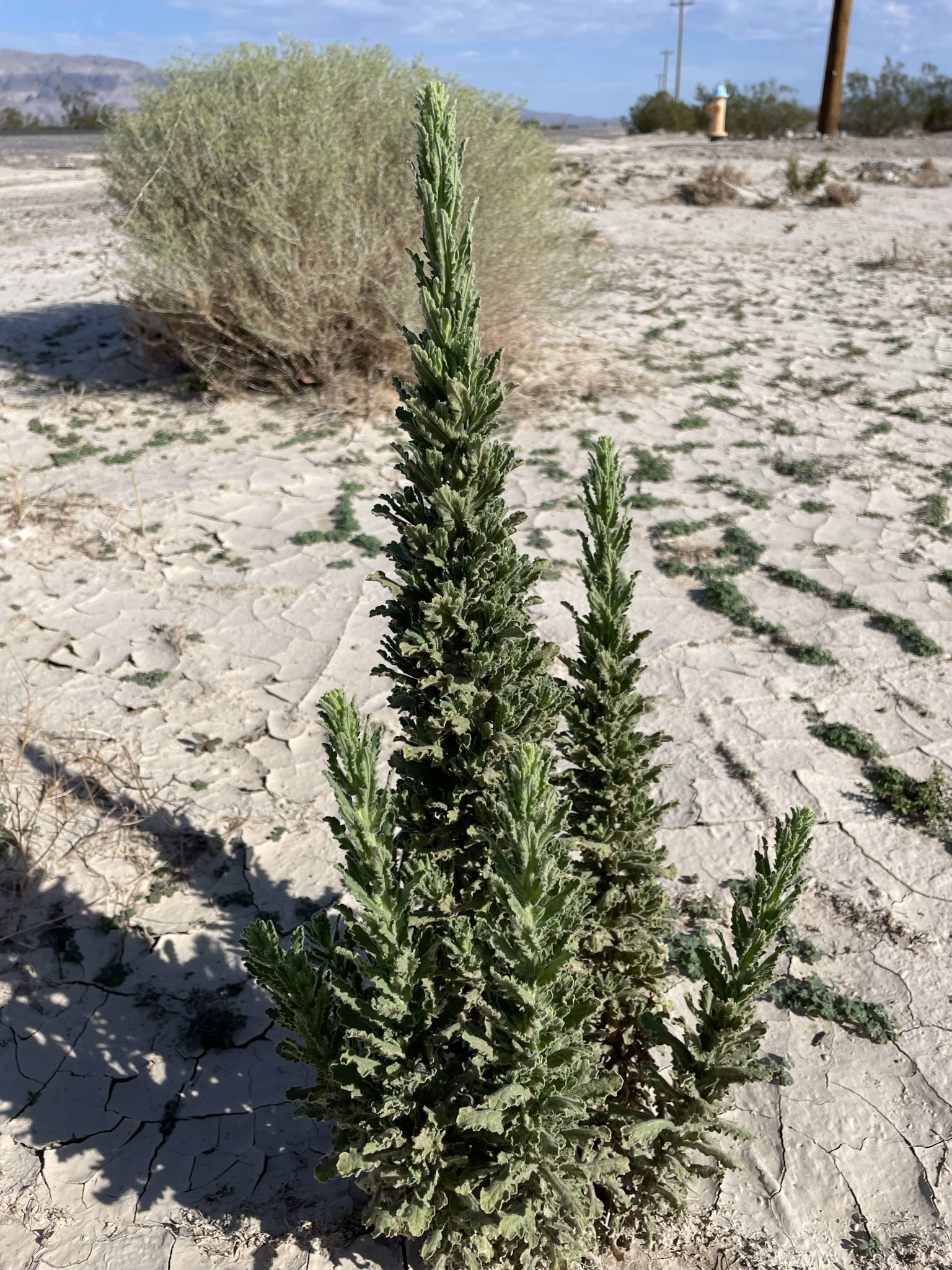

Conservation status
- Secure (NatureServe)

Scientific classification
- Kingdom: Plantae
- Clade: Tracheophytes
- Clade: Angiosperms
- Clade: Eudicots
- Clade: Asterids
- Order: Asterales
- Family: Asteraceae
- Genus: Laennecia
- Species: L. coulteri

Binomial name
- Laennecia coulteri (A.Gray) G.L.Nesom

Synonyms
- Conyza coulteri A.Gray; Conyzella coulteri (A.Gray) Greene; Erigeron discoideus Kellogg; Eschenbachia coulteri (A.Gray) Rydb.; Leptilon integrifolium Wooton & Standl.

= Laennecia coulteri =

Species of plant

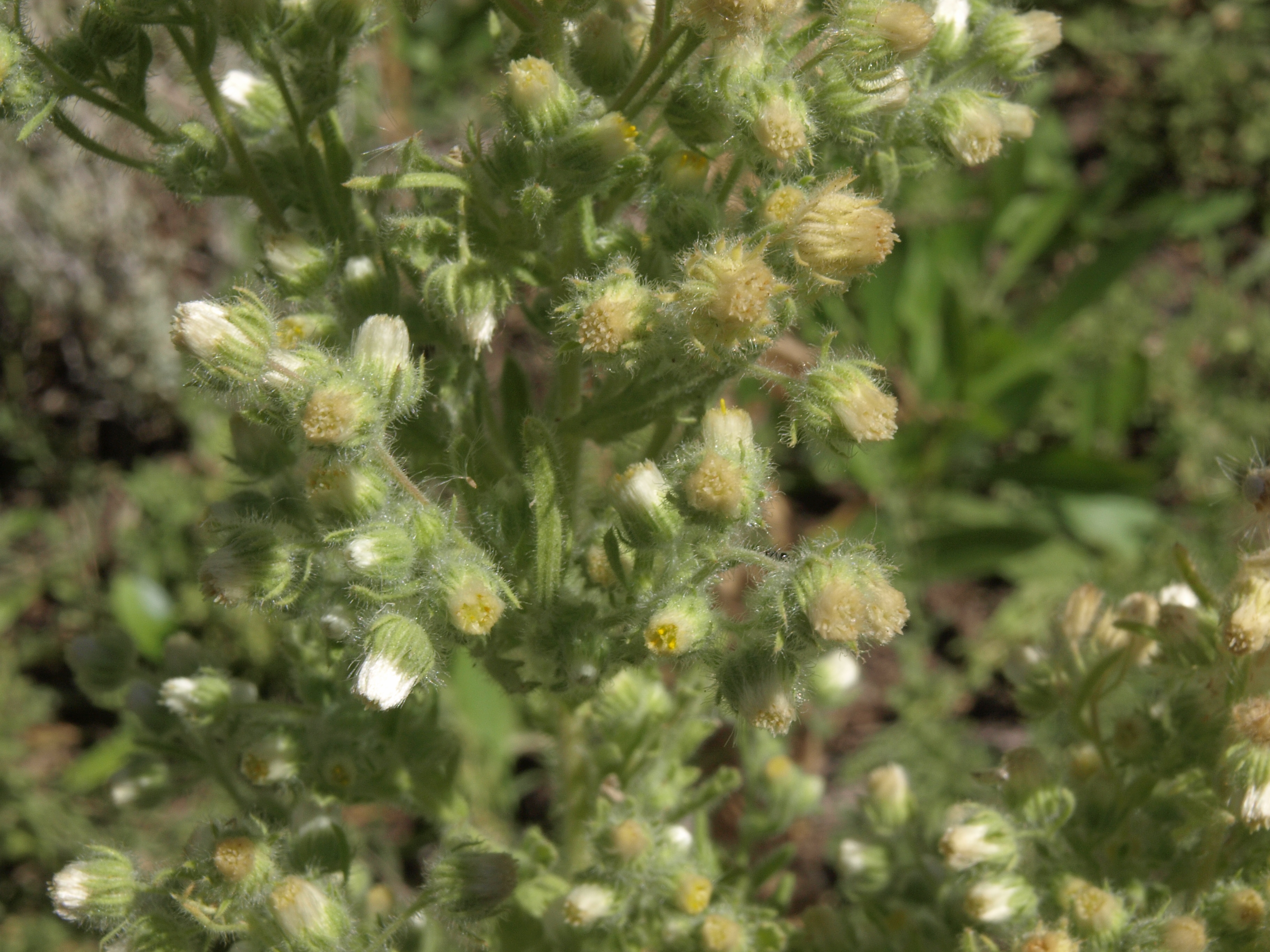
In bloom

Laennecia coulteri, commonly known as Coulter's horseweed, is a plant in the family Asteraceae. It is native to western North America, including California, Nevada, Arizona, New Mexico, Utah, Colorado, Texas, and Northern Mexico. Laennecia coulteri is a herbaceous annual with glandular stems and leaves, generally growing to 3-5 feet tall. It blooms from April - November, depending on location. Often found in disturbed habitats, stream banks, washes, fields, and roadsides in sandy, clayey, or alkaline soils.
