= Prionosciadium bellii =

Scientific classification
- Kingdom: Plantae
- Clade: Tracheophytes
- Clade: Angiosperms
- Clade: Eudicots
- Clade: Asterids
- Order: Apiales
- Family: Apiaceae
- Genus: Prionosciadium
- Species: P. bellii

Binomial name
- Prionosciadium bellii Mathias & Constance

Species of plant

Prionosciadium bellii is a plant species endemic to the Mexican State of Michoacán. It occurs in brush areas at elevations of 1,800–2,100 m (5,900–6,900 ft).

Prionosciadium bellii is a biennial herb up to 3 m (9.8 ft) tall. Leaves are up to 40 cm (16 in) long, pinnatifid with tapering lanceolate segments. Flowers are reddish-purple or greenish-yellow. Fruits are oval, up to 12 mm (0.47 in) long.
