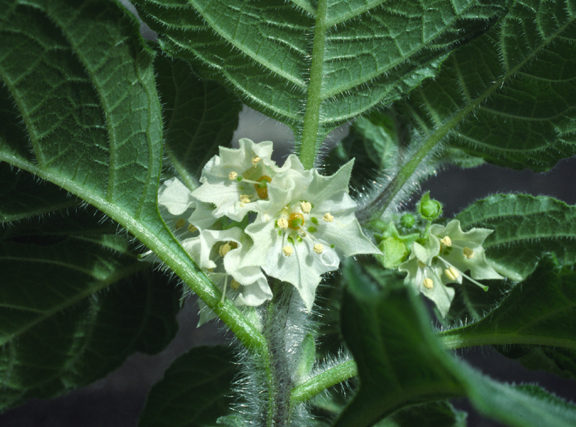

Scientific classification
- Kingdom: Plantae
- Clade: Tracheophytes
- Clade: Angiosperms
- Clade: Eudicots
- Clade: Asterids
- Order: Solanales
- Family: Solanaceae
- Genus: Jaltomata
- Species: J. lojae

Binomial name
- Jaltomata lojae Mione

= Jaltomata lojae =

Species of plant

Jaltomata lojae is a plant species native to Peru and Ecuador.

Jaltomata lojae is a perennial shrub. Flowers are white with green spots near the center. Fruits are orange at maturity.
