= Prionosciadium watsonii =

Scientific classification
- Kingdom: Plantae
- Clade: Tracheophytes
- Clade: Angiosperms
- Clade: Eudicots
- Clade: Asterids
- Order: Apiales
- Family: Apiaceae
- Genus: Prionosciadium
- Species: P. watsonii

Binomial name
- Prionosciadium watsonii J.M. Coult. & Rose

Synonyms
- Peucedanum mexicanum S. Wats. [not Prionosciadium mexicanum (Vatke) S. Wats. (1881)]

Species of plant

Prionosciadium watsonii is a plant species known from the Mexican states of Durango and Sinaloa.

Prionosciadium watsonii is a biennial herb with a large taproot. Leaves are compound with narrowly lanceolate, some of the leaflets with narrowly lanceolate lobes. Flowers are borne in umbels on the tips of branches.
