= Jaltomata werffii =

Scientific classification
- Kingdom: Plantae
- Clade: Tracheophytes
- Clade: Angiosperms
- Clade: Eudicots
- Clade: Asterids
- Order: Solanales
- Family: Solanaceae
- Genus: Jaltomata
- Species: J. werffii

Binomial name
- Jaltomata werffii D'Arcy

Species of flowering plant

Jaltomata werffii is a plant species endemic to the Galápagos Islands in Ecuador. The epithet was spelled "werfii" in the original publication, but was corrected to "werffii" later, per Article 60.1 of the Code. The single "f" was a typographical error, as the plant was named in honor of Henk van der Werff.

Jaltomata werffii is an herb up to 1 m tall. Flowers are borne in axillary umbels of 3-4 white flowers. Fruits are orange.
