= Temósachic Municipality =

Municipality in the Mexican state of Chihuahua

Temósachic
- Municipality
- Municipality of Temósachic in Chihuahua

- Location in Mexico
- Coordinates: 28°57′N 107°50′W
- Country: Mexico
- State: Chihuahua
- Municipal seat: Temósachic
- Founded: November 21, 1844

Area
  - Total: 5,361.9 km^{2} (2,070.2 sq mi)

Population (2010)
  - Total: 6,211
  - Density: 1.158/km^{2} (3.000/sq mi)

Temósachic is one of the 67 municipalities of Chihuahua, in northern Mexico. The municipal seat lies at Temósachic. The municipality covers an area of 5,361.9 km^{2}.

As of 2010, the municipality had a total population of 6,211, down from 6,319 as of 2005.

As of 2010, the town of Temósachic had a population of 1,841. Other than the town of Temósachic, the municipality had 329 localities, none of which had a population over 1,000.

== Geography ==
=== Towns and villages ===
The municipality has 421 localities. The largest are:

Name	Population (2005)
Temósachic	1,786
Yepachic	649
Yepómera	485
Cocomorachic	314
Total Municipality	6,319

== History ==
Eight vehicles were ambushed and four police officers killed and six wounded along the highway from Temósachic to Madera. The deceased were identified as Sergio Luna Escalante, Efraín Ríos Rodríguez, Noel Omar Ronquillo López, and Luis Raúl Piñón Gómez.
