= Tepehuán language =

Uto-Aztecan language spoken in Mexico

Tepehuán
- O'otham
- Native to: Mexico
- Region: Chihuahua, Durango
- Ethnicity: Tepehuán
- Native speakers: 55,000 (2020 census)
- Language family: Uto-Aztecan: Southern Uto-Aztecan; Tepiman; Tepehuán
- Dialects: Tepecano

Language codes
- ISO 639-3: Variously: ntp – Northern Tepehuán stp – Southeastern Tepehuán tla – Southwestern Tepehuán tep – Tepecano
- Glottolog: tepe1281
- Northern Tepehuán is classified as Critically Endangered by the UNESCO Atlas of the World's Languages in Danger.

- Southwestern Tepehuán is classified as Vulnerable by the UNESCO Atlas of the World's Languages in Danger.

Tepehuán (Tepehuano) is the name of three closely related languages of the Piman branch of the Uto-Aztecan language family, all spoken in northern Mexico. The language is called O'otham by its speakers.

== Internal classification ==
- Tepehuán
  - Northern Tepehuán
  - Southern Tepehuán
    - Southeastern Tepehuán
    - Southwestern Tepehuán

== Northern Tepehuán ==
Northern Tepehuán is spoken by about 10,000 people (2020 census) in several settlements in Guadalupe y Calvo and Guachochi, Chihuahua, as well as in the north of Durango. communities like Santiago Papasquiaro—including El Jaguey, Colonia José Ramón Valdez (1616 historical revolt area), El Huisache (Leyva-Tafoya family ranch), and Jose Maria Morelos settlements.

The Ódami—self-named "People of This Land" in their ancient tongue—resided in these Sierra Madre strongholds as Nahuatl-labeled "mountain people" (tepetl 'mountain' + huani 'inhabitant') by Mexica/Tepanec, marking them as frontier traders, allies, or rivals beyond the Aztec Triple Alliance (Tenochtitlan, Texcoco, Tlacopan). In 1616, Northern Ódami led a major revolt (1616–1620) against Spanish Jesuits and settlers, killing over 200 Spaniards and 10 missionaries in coordinated attacks on Atotonilco and Santiago Papasquiaro under leaders like Quautlatas and Francisco Gogoxito, before Spanish suppression amid massive losses (~4,000 Ódami warriors).

== Media ==
Tepehuán-language programming is carried by the CDI's radio stations XEJMN-AM, broadcasting from Jesús María, Nayarit, and XETAR, based in Guachochi, Chihuahua.

== Morphology ==
Tepehuán is an agglutinative language, in which words use suffix complexes for a variety of purposes with several morphemes strung together.

== Phonology ==
=== Northern Tepehuan ===
The following is representative of the Northern dialect of Tepehuan.

==== Vowels ====
	Front	Central	Back
Close	i	ɨ	u
Mid			o
Open		a	

==== Consonants ====
		Labial	Alveolar	Post- alveolar	Palatal	Velar
Plosive	voiceless	p	t tʲ			k
Plosive	voiced	b	d dʲ			ɡ
Affricate				t͡ʃ		
Fricative		v	s	ʃ		x
Nasal		m	n		ɲ	
Rhotic			r			
Approximant			l			

Nasal consonants /n, ɲ/ become [ŋ] when preceding a velar consonant.

=== Southern Tepehuan ===
The following is representative of the Southeastern dialect of Tepehuan.

==== Vowels ====
	Front	Back	
Close	i	ɯ	u
Mid		ʌ	o
Open		ɑ	

==== Consonants ====
		Labial	Alveolar	Post- alveolar	Palatal	Velar	Glottal
Plosive	voiceless	p	t			k	ʔ
Plosive	voiced	b	d			ɡ	ʔ
Affricate	voiceless			t͡ʃ			
Affricate	voiced			d͡ʒ		ɣ͡ʎ	
Fricative		v	s	ʃ			h
Nasal		m	n		ɲ		
Rhotic			ɾ				
Approximant			(l)		j		

/v/ is sometimes realized as [f] in word-final position. /l/ appears only in loanwords from Spanish.

== Sample Tepehuan Text ==
Northern Tepehuan:

Gʌrooga aapipʌsmaacʌdʌ tʌvaagɨʌrʌ daja, aatʌmʌ ipʌlidɨ ɨʌoodami gʌšiia duutuadagɨ. Vai otoma aʌna istuigaco gatʌaanʌda agai aapi ʌʌgɨ tami oidigɨ daama. Vaidʌ ʌpʌduuna pʌštumaasɨ aapɨ ipʌlidi tami oidigi daama poduucai isduucai ʌpʌvueeyi tʌvaagiʌrʌ. Gʌrsoiñañi tʌtai viaaca aatʌmʌ cuaadagai tʌšɨ ʌʌšɨ tʌgito sivɨ vʌʌtarʌ. Gʌroigʌldañɨ gʌrsoimaascamiga tʌsmaacʌdʌ ivueeyi poduucai tʌsduucai oigʌldi aatʌmʌ ʌgai ismaacʌdʌ šoimaasi gʌrvuiididi. Maiti dagito išʌDiaavora gʌraagiadan taadacagi isiduñia aatʌmʌ soimaasi. Cʌʌ maatʌ aatʌmʌ isaapi ʌrʌgʌʌ baitʌc ʌaacamitʌvaagiʌrʌ dai oidi daama tomastuigaco, dai aapi vaamioma viaa guvucadagaɨ tomastuigaco istomali ʌmo ʌmai daɨ isaliʌšɨ gʌaagai ɨsvʌʌšɨ oodami gʌsiaa duutuadagɨ tomastuigaco.	Our father, which art in heaven, hallowed be thy name. Thy kingdom come. Thy will be done on earth as it is in heaven. Give us this day our daily bread. And forgive us our debts, as we forgive our debtors. And lead us not into temptation, :but deliver us from evil. For thine is the kingdom and the power and the glory for ever and ever. Amen.

Southeastern Tepehuan:

Utogga atemo tubaggue :dama Santu sicamoe uggue ututugaraga duviana uguiere api odduna gutuguito daraga tami dubar dama tubggue. Udguaddaga ud macane schibi ud joigadane ud seca doada raga addu cate abemo joigudu jut jaddune maitague daguito soy macire ud niuca dacane api odduna. Amen, Jesus.	Our father, which art in heaven, hallowed be :thy name. Thy kingdom come. Thy will be done :on earth as it is in heaven. Give us this day our daily bread. And forgive us our debts, as we forgive our debtors. And lead us not into temptation, :but deliver us from evil. For thine is the :kingdom and the power and the glory for ever :and ever. Amen.
