= Joseph Edward Laferrière =

American botanist

- Born: 1955 (age 70–71)
- Education: University of Arizona
- Scientific career
- Fields: Botany
- Author abbrev. (botany): Laferr.

Joseph Edward Laferrière (born 1955) is an American botanist with a particular interest in ethnobotany.

He obtained his Ph.D. from the Department of Ecology and Evolutionary Biology at the University of Arizona in 1991 with a dissertation titled "Optimal use of ethnobotanical resources by the Mountain Pima of Chihuahua, Mexico". Among other institutions, he has held professional positions at Washington State University, Biosphere 2, and the Universidad Autónoma del Estado de Morelos (in Cuernavaca, Mexico).

He is the author or co-author of the botanical names of some 120 taxa, including Berberis pimana, Hymenocallis clivorum, Hymenocallis pimana, Laennecia pimana, Pectis pimana, Prionosciadium saraviki, and Yucca declinata.
