= Ofelia Zepeda =

American linguist and poet

- Born: 1952 (age 73–74); Stanfield, Arizona, United States
- Title: Professor
- Awards: Macarthur Fellow

Academic background
- Education: University of Arizona (BA, MA, PhD)
- Thesis: Topics in Papago Morphology (1984)
- Doctoral advisor: Susan Steele

Academic work
- Discipline: Linguistics
- Sub-discipline: Language documentation, language revitalization, Tohono Oʼodham, indigenous languages of the Americas
- Institutions: The University of Arizona
- Website: University of Arizona Faculty Page

Ofelia Zepeda (born 1952 in Stanfield, Arizona) is a poet and intellectual of the Tohono Oʼodham Nation located in the United States. She is Regents' Professor of Tohono O'odham language and linguistics and Director of the American Indian Language Development Institute (AILDI) at the University of Arizona. Dr. Zepeda is also the recipient of a Department of Education grant that establishes a regional resource center for indigenous languages, the West Regional Native American Language Resource Center.

Zepeda is the series editor for Sun Tracks. University of Arizona Press publishes this series, which focuses on the work of indigenous artists and writers. She is an inductee to the Arizona Women's Hall of Fame.

== Life ==
Zepeda is a professor of linguistics at the University of Arizona and is well-known for her efforts in the preservation of and promotion of literacy in Tohono O'odham. She served as director of the American Indian Studies Program at the University of Arizona from 1986 to 1991. She is a consultant and advocate on behalf of some American indigenous languages. She is the author of A Papago Grammar and co-author of the article "Derived Words in Tohono O'odham", published in the International Journal of American Linguistics. She was a student of MIT linguistics professor Ken Hale.

Zepeda has worked with her tribe to improve literacy in both English and Tohono O'odham. In 1983, she developed A Papago Grammar from tapes of Native speakers because no textbook existed for the classes she taught. Her work with the reservation committee for Tohono O'odham language policy yielded an official policy that encourages the speaking of the Native language at all grade levels.

In 1995 she published a book of poetry, Ocean Power: Poems from the Desert, and she titled the introduction, "Things That Help Me Begin to Remember".

In 1999, Zepeda received a MacArthur Fellowship. She was a member of the literary advisory committee for Sun Tracks, a publishing program featuring Native American works, and is the series editor. In 2012, her book of poetry was banned by Tucson schools.

== Works ==
- ——; McCarty, Teresa L. (2014). "The Racializing Function of Medium-of Instruction Policies in Indigenous and Minoritized Education". In Dixon, Adrienne (ed.). Researching Race in Education: Policy, Practice and Qualitative Research. IAP. pp. 111–134. ISBN 978-1-62396-678-2.
- —— (2008). Where Clouds Are Formed. Tucson: University of Arizona Press. ISBN 9780816527786.
- —— (2005) [1997]. Jewed 'i-hoi : O'odham c milga:n s-ke:g ha'icu cegĭtodag [Earth movements : a collection of poems in O'odham & English] (in O'odham and English). Kore Press. ISBN 9781888553062.
- Hill, Jane H.; Zepeda, Ofelia (1999). "Language, gender and biology: pulmonic ingressive airstream in women's speech in Tohono O'odham". Southwest Journal of Linguistics. 18 (1): 15–40.
- —— (1995). Home Places: Contemporary Native American Writing from Sun Tracks. Tucson: University of Arizona Press. ISBN 0816515212.
- —— (1995). Ocean Power: Poems from the Desert. Tucson: University of Arizona Press. ISBN 0816515174.
- —— (1983). A Papago Grammar. Tucson: The University of Arizona Press. ISBN 0816507929.
- —— (1982). Mat hekid o ju, 'O'odham Na-cegitodag [When It Rains, Papago and Pima Poetry]. Tucson: University of Arizona Press. ISBN 0816507856.
