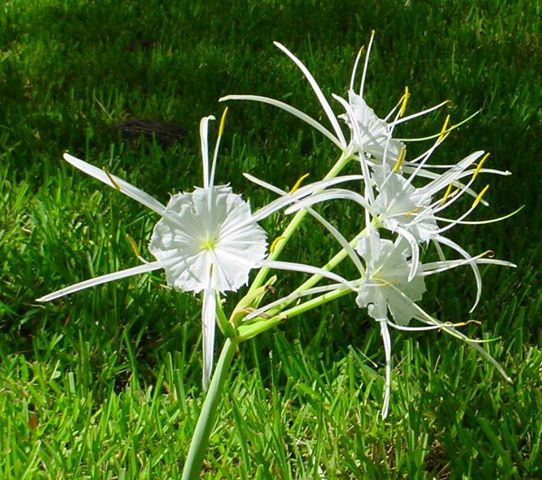
- Hymenocallis pimana in Nabogame, Chihuahua

Scientific classification
- Kingdom: Plantae
- Clade: Tracheophytes
- Clade: Angiosperms
- Clade: Monocots
- Order: Asparagales
- Family: Amaryllidaceae
- Subfamily: Amaryllidoideae
- Genus: Hymenocallis
- Species: H. pimana

Binomial name
- Hymenocallis pimana Laferr.

= Hymenocallis pimana =

Pima spider-lily

Species of flowering plant

Hymenocallis pimana is a member of the genus Hymenocallis, in the family Amaryllidaceae. Common name in English is Pima spider-lily; in Spanish it is cebollín. It is endemic to a small mountainous region in the Sierra Madre Occidental, straddling the Mexican states of Chihuahua and Sonora. Many of the people of the region are of the indigenous group known as the Mountain Pima or Pima Bajo.

Type locale is the small village of Nabogame, approximately 18 km northwest of Yepáchic, Chihuahua and about 10 km east of the frontier with Sonora. This is at elevation of approximately 1800 m (6000 ft).

== Ecology ==
The plant is locally abundant in the vicinity of the type locale. It grows in large colonies of hundreds of individuals, often near waterways and gulleys. This largely due to the nature of the large, green seeds which fall on the ground and germinate close to the parent plant without much dispersal.

The large, showy flowers appear in June, at the beginning of the summer rainy season. Flowers are white and erect, with narrow perianth segments and a prominent corolla. Bulbs resemble small onion bulbs.

== Uses ==
The Pima peoples of the region report that these bulbs provided an emergency food source in years past, during famines that followed crop failures. They say that the bulbs were boiled in lye to remove toxic alkaloids before consumption. This is the only known instance of any people utilizing any member of this genus as food.
