= Yepachic =

Yepáchic Yepáchi
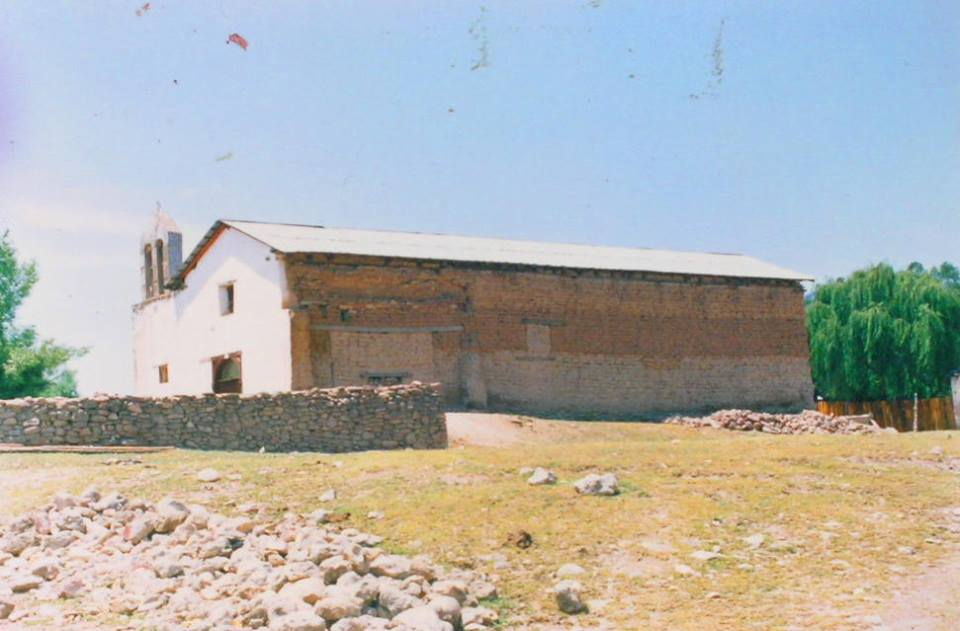
- Spanish mission church in Yepáchic

- Location within Chihuahua Location within Mexico
- Coordinates: 28.4219428°N 108.3950095°W
- Country: Mexico
- State: Chihuahua
- Municipality: Temósachic
- Elevation: 1,780 m (5,840 ft)

Population (2010)
  - Total: 851

Yepáchic, sometimes spelled Yepáchi, is a community in the western part of the Mexican State of Chihuahua, approximately 10 km (6.2 mi) east of the boundary with the State of Sonora. It is located in the Municipio de Temósachic at an altitude of 1,780 meters (5,840 ft) in the Sierra Madre Occidental. Many of the people of the region are members of the indigenous ethnic group called Mountain Pima or the Pima Bajo. They are related to the Pima and Papago (Tohono O'odham) of Arizona and northern Sonora, speaking a similar but distinct language.

Most maps give the name as Yepáchic, but the citizens in the town and the road signs in the vicinity spell it Yepachi. The population in 2010 was officially listed as 851, but this number swells to a few thousand on the holidays when people from small hamlets in the surrounding region congregate in Yepáchic.

Some of the flatter regions have been cleared for farming. The people of the region plant maize, beans, squash, potatoes, and various other crops. They also raise cattle, goats, pigs, chickens, turkeys, and other livestock. The local people eat most of the crops themselves, but most of the cattle raised is sold to buyers from the lowlands. There is also lumbering in the region, a needed source of income for the people of the area.

== History ==
Yepáchic traces its recorded history to 1677, when Jesuit missionaries settled in the area. The rugged terrain had prevented Spanish attempts at pacification of the region before that date. The old mission church built in Yepáchic is still in use today, the only such mission church still standing in the region.

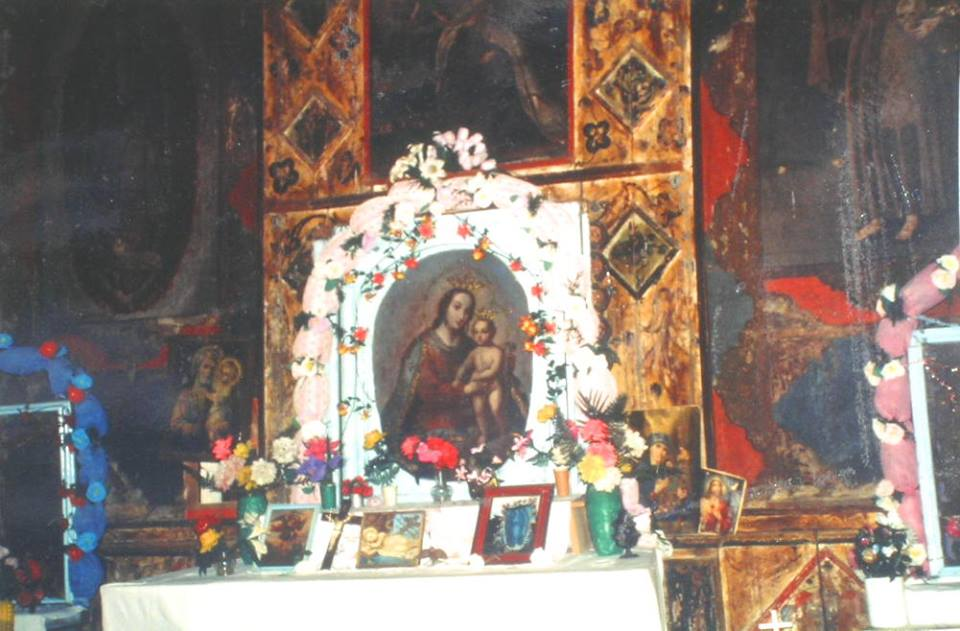
Interior of Spanish mission church in Yepachi, Chihuahua, Mexico

Yepáchic was affected in the 17th century by anti-Spanish uprisings by the Tarahumara to the south, and later in the 19th century by Apache raids from the north. The town was briefly abandoned several times because of these conflicts.

As recently as the 1890s, virtually all the residents of Yepáchic were of Pima heritage. In more recent decades, mestizos from the Mexican lowlands have migrated into the area, and now own most of the homes and nearly all the shops in the center of town. Pima continue to inhabit outlying areas.

The region continued to be isolated and largely untouched by the outside world through the middle of the 20th century. There was no road into the area until the 1930s, when a primitive dirt road was built. A much better gravel road replaced this in the 1970s, crossing the mountains and allowing traffic to cross the mountains for the first time. This road was paved in 1990, resulting in regular bus service and a large amount of commercial trucking between Chihuahua and Hermosillo passing through the Pima region.

== Anthropology ==
There have been several anthropological and ethnobotanical studies in Yepáchic and in the surrounding area. Estrada-Fernández studied the traditional indigenous Pima language, publishing an overview of their grammar, syntax and vocabulary. She identified consistent dialectical differences between communities in the region, especially between villages in Sonora and those in Chihuahua.

Dunnigan studied relations between the Pima and their mestizo neighbors. He wrote that traditional rituals such as Semana Santa [Holy Week] play an important role in inter-ethnic relations. This is because the Pima control the elaborate traditional celebrations, reinforcing their identity as a distinct group.

Pennington gathered information on use of medicinal plants by the people of Yepáchic Laferrière continued the ethnobotanical work in the area. He investigated the use of wild and cultivated plants in Yepachic and in the outlying hamlet of Nabogame, 18 km (11 mi) to the northwest. Wild plants eaten by the Pima include 3 species not previously described by modern science (Hymenocallis pimana, Berberis pimana and Prionosciadium saraviki).

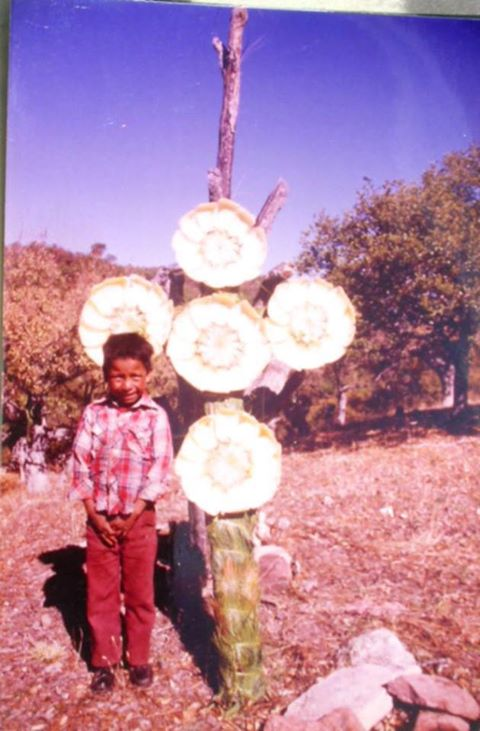
Decorative flowers made from leaf bases of sotol, Darylirion wheeleri, Yepachi, Chihuahua

== Religion ==
Most of the people in Yepáchic are Roman Catholics, practicing an antiquated form of the faith taught to them by missionaries centuries ago. This is mixed with remnants of the older indigenous beliefs, mostly in the form of folk tales. Jehovah's Witnesses have been actively recruiting new members in the region.

Semana Santa (Holy Week) practices are quite elaborate. The people decorate the town with flowers and wreaths. They also set up 14 small shrines set up along the streets, representing the 14 stations of the Cross, as per Catholic custom. Each consists of an old print depicting a scene from the Bible. People walk along the route, stopping at each of the 14 shrines and praying at each one. On Good Friday, men carry around the town a platform laden with adobe bricks, along a route that begins and ends at the church. This is a symbolic reenactment of the funeral of Jesus.

On Día de los Muertos (Day of the Dead), people congregate in the town cemetery. People locate the graves of lost relatives, clean the weeds off them, and decorate them with flowers, crosses and candles. Some of the mestizos use artificial flowers purchased at the local stores, but most of the Pima use freshly cut flowers from gardens. A priest them performs mass in the cemetery.

== Geography ==
The climate of the region is one of the coolest in all of Mexico. Snow is not uncommon for the region in the winter. Spring and Fall are dry seasons, with thunderstorms prevalent in late summer. Predominant vegetation in the region is a mixed forest of pine and oak. Mountains are frequently rather steep, often with loose crumbling soil preventing easy travel. South of Yepáchic, there is a deep canyon with thorny, scrub vegetation characteristic of more arid regions.

Climate data for Yepachic (1951–2010)
Month	Jan	Feb	Mar	Apr	May	Jun	Jul	Aug	Sep	Oct	Nov	Dec	Year
Record high °C (°F)	27.0 (80.6)	28.0 (82.4)	34.0 (93.2)	39.0 (102.2)	38.0 (100.4)	40.0 (104.0)	37.0 (98.6)	39.0 (102.2)	38.0 (100.4)	34.0 (93.2)	30.0 (86.0)	28.0 (82.4)	40.0 (104.0)
Mean daily maximum °C (°F)	17.1 (62.8)	18.0 (64.4)	19.6 (67.3)	22.5 (72.5)	27.2 (81.0)	29.7 (85.5)	26.9 (80.4)	26.8 (80.2)	25.9 (78.6)	23.3 (73.9)	19.9 (67.8)	16.3 (61.3)	22.8 (73.0)
Daily mean °C (°F)	7.8 (46.0)	8.6 (47.5)	10.3 (50.5)	12.6 (54.7)	16.1 (61.0)	19.9 (67.8)	19.7 (67.5)	19.6 (67.3)	17.9 (64.2)	14.0 (57.2)	10.4 (50.7)	7.9 (46.2)	13.7 (56.7)
Mean daily minimum °C (°F)	−1.5 (29.3)	−0.8 (30.6)	1.0 (33.8)	2.7 (36.9)	5.0 (41.0)	10.0 (50.0)	12.5 (54.5)	12.3 (54.1)	10.0 (50.0)	4.8 (40.6)	1.0 (33.8)	−0.6 (30.9)	4.7 (40.5)
Record low °C (°F)	−12.0 (10.4)	−11.0 (12.2)	−9.0 (15.8)	−6.5 (20.3)	−4.5 (23.9)	2.0 (35.6)	4.0 (39.2)	0.0 (32.0)	1.0 (33.8)	−2.0 (28.4)	−9.0 (15.8)	−10.0 (14.0)	−12.0 (10.4)
Average precipitation mm (inches)	47.4 (1.87)	57.3 (2.26)	18.1 (0.71)	16.4 (0.65)	16.8 (0.66)	85.4 (3.36)	256.6 (10.10)	207.0 (8.15)	106.5 (4.19)	48.7 (1.92)	35.2 (1.39)	46.8 (1.84)	942.2 (37.09)
Average precipitation days (≥ 0.1 mm)	3.1	4.2	2.1	1.4	1.8	9.6	20.5	18.3	10.1	3.7	2.5	3.5	80.8
Source: Servicio Meteorologico Nacional
