= Pima Bajo people =

Indigenous people of Mexico

Pima Bajo or Mountain Pima
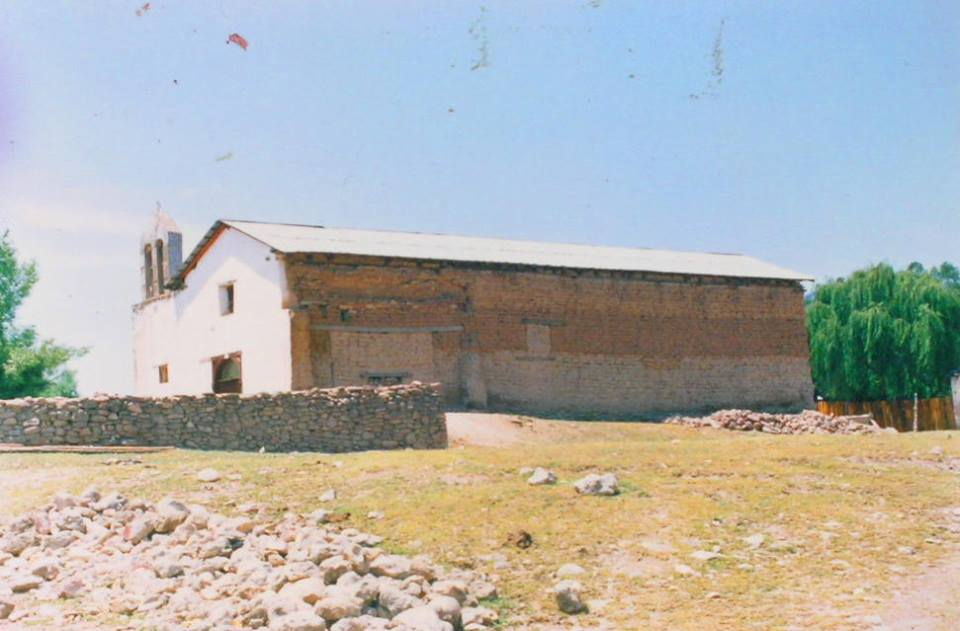
- Old Spanish mission church, Yepachic

Total population
- 2,000-3,000

Regions with significant populations
- Mexico (Sonora and Chihuahua)

Languages
- O'ochkam, Spanish

Religion
- Christianity

Related ethnic groups
- Akimel O'odham, Tohono Oʼodham, Tepehuán

The Pima Bajo (Lower Pima) people are an Indigenous people of Mexico who reside in a mountainous region along the line between the states of Chihuahua and Sonora in northern Mexico. They are related to the Akimel O'odham (Pima) and Tohono O’odham of Arizona and northern Sonora, speaking a similar but distinct language.

Lower Pima groups include:

- the Névome (historical territory: Sonora River and Yaqui River)
- the Mountain Pima (historical territory: Sierra Madre Occidental)
- the Cocomacaques (historical territory: near Hermosillo)

"Bajo" or "Lower" as part of the name refers to the geographic location in the southern part of the traditional Pima homeland. Some peoples identifying themselves as Pima and speaking the Pima language formerly lived farther west in the lowlands of Sonora, but they have long been absorbed into mainstream Mexican society. At present, the Pima Bajo are located in rugged, mountainous terrain in the Sierra Madre Occidental.

Major communities in the Pima Bajo region include Maycoba and Yécora on the Sonoran side of the line, Yepáchic on the Chihuahuan. All three of these communities were almost exclusively Pima in the 19th century, but in recent decades many mainstream Mexicans from the lowlands have migrated into the area.

Traditional Pima Bajo culture in many ways resembles the cultures of the neighboring Warihio and Tarahumara peoples more than that of the other Pima peoples to the northwest. This is partly due to the common mountainous habitat, partly due to a long history of interactions between the groups. The Pima were also converted to Christianity early in the Spanish period, and most of them still practice an antiquated, almost medieval, form of Catholicism introduced by the Jesuit missionaries.

At present, the people are in the process of being acculturated into mainstream society, especially since the paving of the highway through the area in the late 1980s. The Pima do, however, attempt to preserve their identity as a distinct culture. There have been some attempts at reviving. A few of the tribal leaders collected some traditional Pima myths and published them in a book in the Pima language to be distributed in the region. Holidays, especially Holy Week (Semana Santa) involve elaborate ceremonies and celebrations reflecting the form of Catholicism practiced by the Pima. Mainstream Mexicans are allowed to attend and to participate, but Pima tribal leaders organize and supervise the activities.
