= Cupeño (disambiguation) =

Cupeño may refer to:

- the Cupeño people
- the Cupeño language
- Cupeño traditional narratives
