= Maidu Museum & Historic Site =

Archaeological site in California, United States

Coordinates: 38.7386°N 121.2458°W

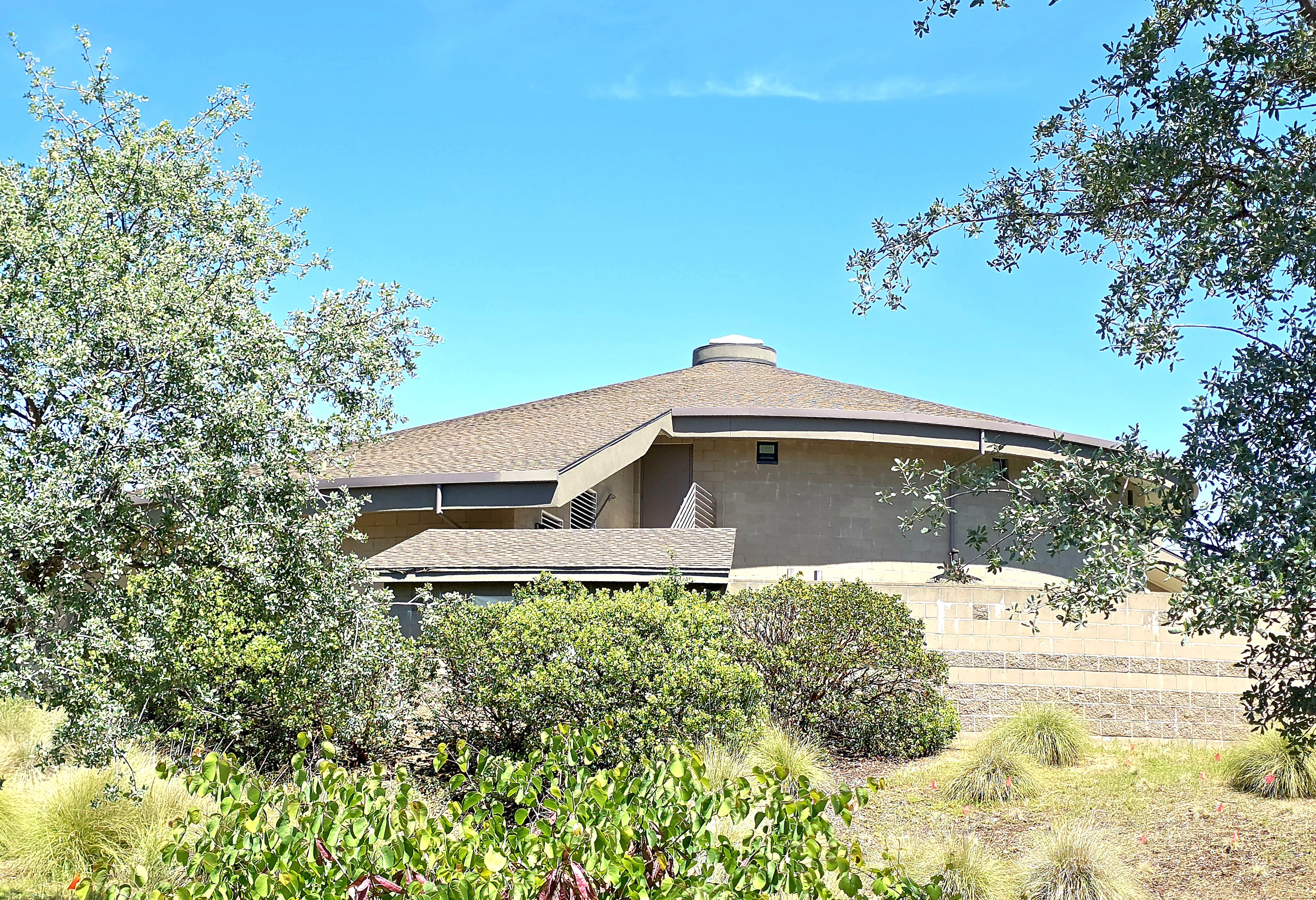
- Exterior of the Maidu Museum
- Established: 1998
- Location: 1970 Johnson Ranch Drive; Roseville, California, United States
- Type: Interpretive Center
- Website: Official website

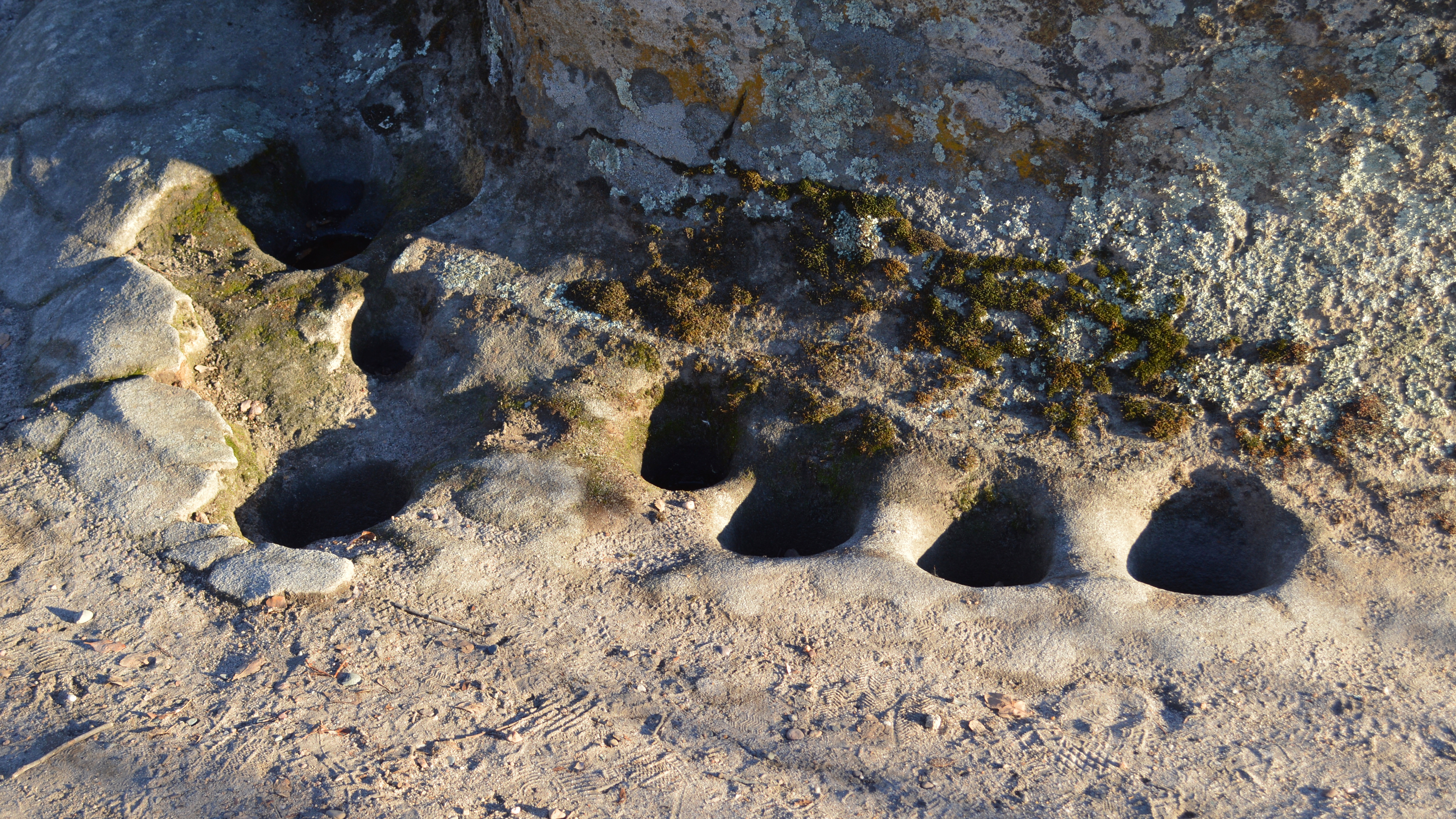
Grinding holes at the historic site

The Maidu Museum & Historic Site is an interpretive center museum dedicated to public education about the Maidu peoples of what is now California. It is operated by the city of Roseville, California and located there.

== About ==
The museum sits at an ancient site where Nisenan Maidu families lived for 3,000 years. Hundreds of bedrock mortar holes, petroglyphs on sandstone boulders, rock art, and a vast midden area are evidence of thousands of years of residence. The site has been on the National Register of Historic Places since 1973.

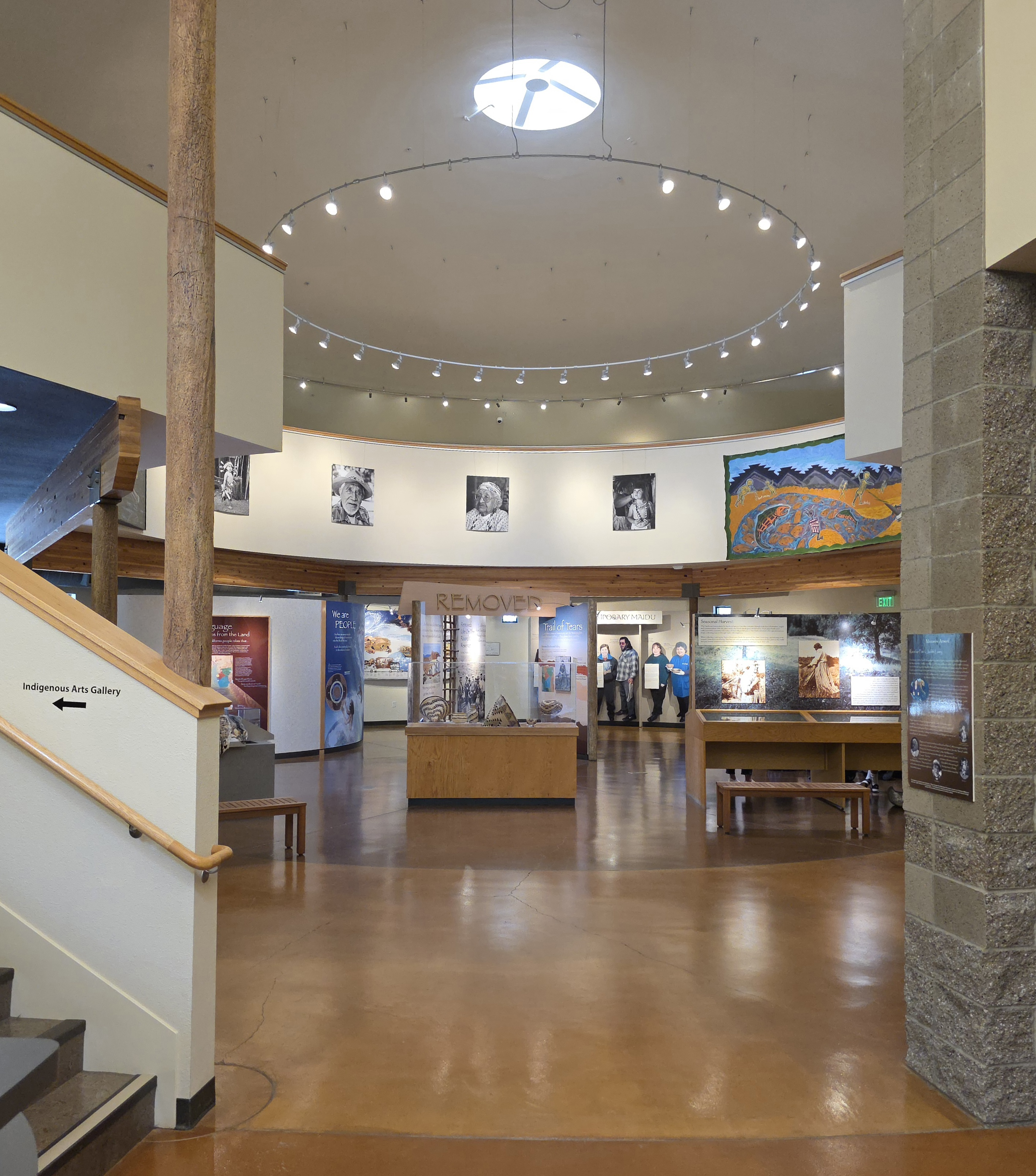
Maidu Museum interior

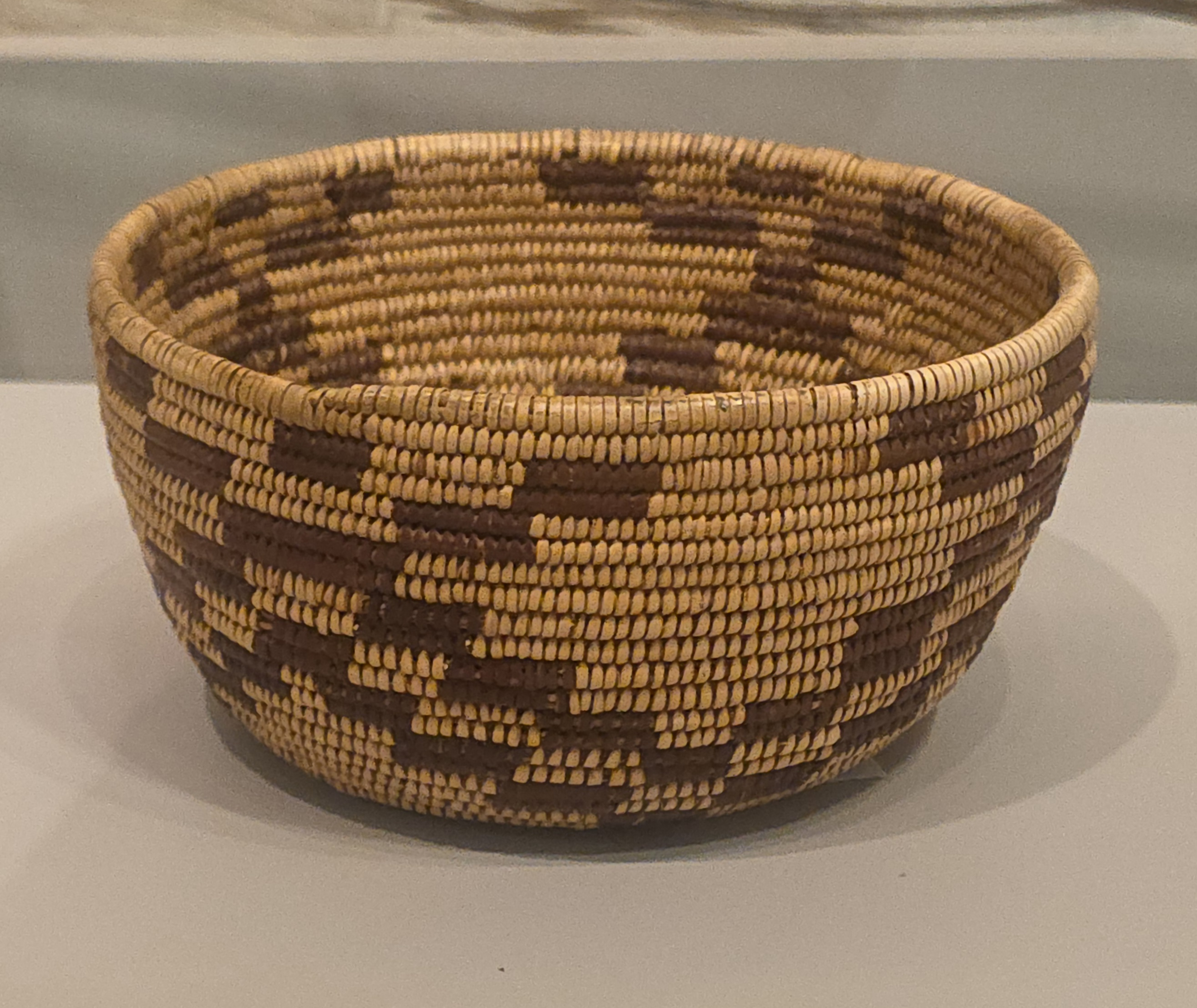
Maidu coiled basket ca. 1915 by Lizzie Enos of the Nisenan Maidu

The site is unique in the presentation of Maidu life. The museum offers interpretive programs, exhibits, multi-media presentations, and special events.

== History ==
The City of Roseville, California purchased the site in 1993 and added it to Maidu Regional Park. It is the location of an ancient Nisenan Maidu village. The site includes hiking trails. It has been listed on the National Register of Historic Places under the name Strap Ravine Nisenan Maidu Indian Site since 1993. Initial planning for a 7,200 square foot museum building began as early as 1993. The City of Roseville approved those plans in 1995. In 2008, the museum received $150,000 grant from the Institute of Museum and Library Services for the purpose of developing exhibits about Maidu traditions and family life.

Development of the museum was led by Nisenan elder Hickey Murray, Roseville resident Myron Zents, and Ed Mahany, director of Roseville public parks. The museum opened in 2010.

The museum serves as a resource to help preserve the endangered Maidu languages and to help bring traditional Maidu foods and foraged edible plants to the public, and more broadly serves as a center for cultural preservation for Maidu people and education about the Maidu for the entire community.

== See also ==
- California State Indian Museum
