= Cupeño =

Native American people from Southern California

Cupeño Kuupangaxwichem
- Traditional lands of the Cupeño people in light purple

Total population
- 1,000 (1990)

Regions with significant populations
- United States (California)

Languages
- English, Spanish, formerly Cupeño

Religion
- Traditional tribal religion, Christianity (Roman Catholic, Protestant)

Related ethnic groups
- Cahuilla, Luiseño, Serrano, and Tongva

The Cupeño (or Kuupangaxwichem) are a Native American tribe of Southern California.

They traditionally lived about 50 miles (80 km) inland and 50 miles (80 km) north of the modern day Mexico–United States border in the Peninsular Range of Southern California. Today their descendants are members of the federally recognized tribes known as the Pala Band of Luiseño Mission Indians, Morongo Band of Cahuilla Mission Indians, and Los Coyotes Band of Cahuilla and Cupeno Indians.

== History ==
Several different groups combined to form Cupeño culture around 1000 to 1200 AD. They were closely related to Cahuilla culture. The Cupeño people traditionally lived in the mountains in the San José Valley at the headwaters of the San Luis Rey River. Their name in their own language is "Kuupangaxwichem" ("people who slept here").

They lived in two autonomous villages, Wilákalpa and Kúpa (or Cupa), located north of present-day Warner Springs, California. Their homelands extended to Agua Caliente, located east of Lake Henshaw in an area now crossed by State Highway 79 near Warner Springs. The 200-acre (0.81 km^{2}) Cupeño Indian village site is now abandoned but evidence of its historical importance remains.

=== Spanish and Mexican occupation ===
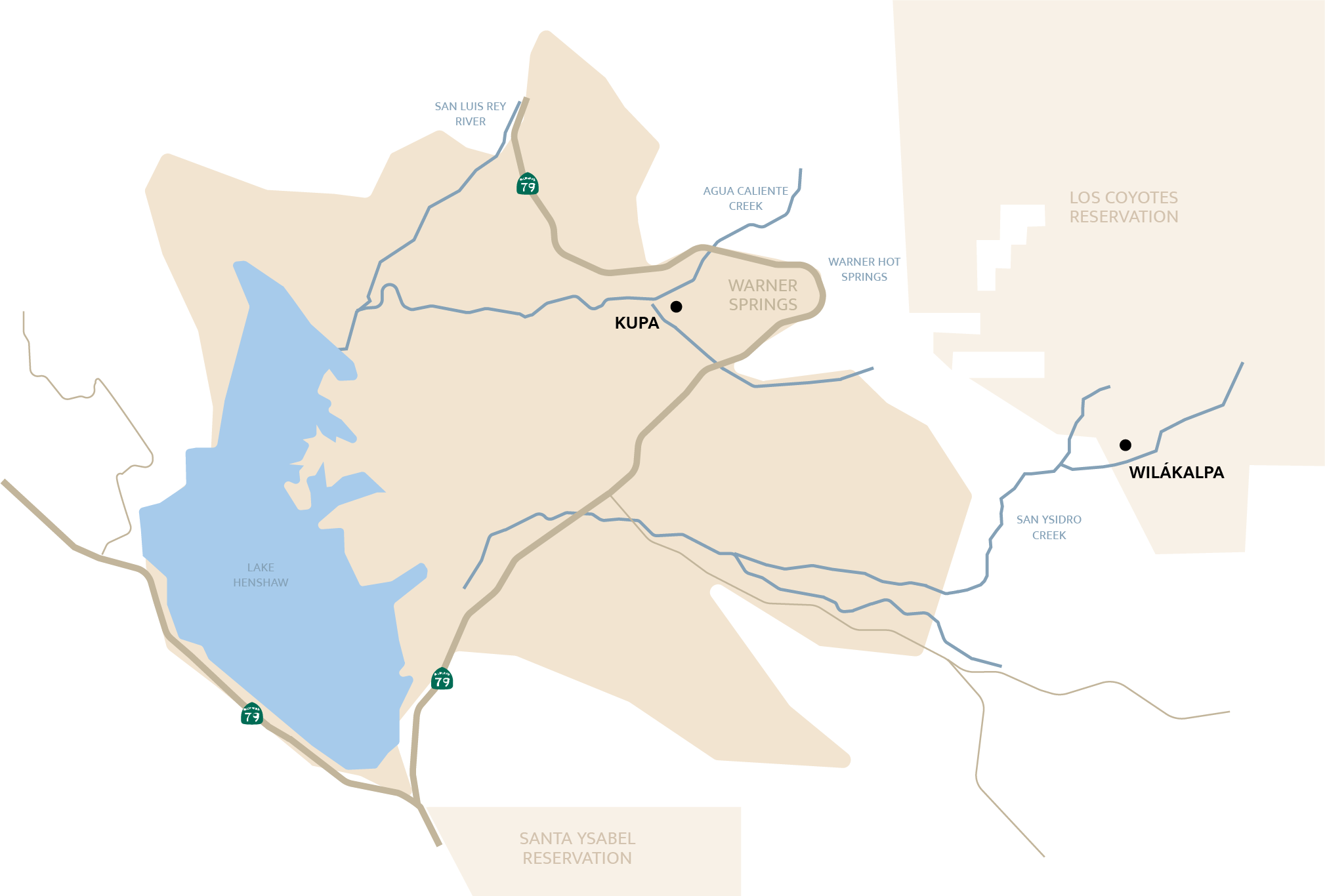
The Cupeño villages also showing Warner Springs for reference

Spaniards entered Cupeño lands in 1795 and took control of the lands by the 19th century. After Mexico achieved independence, its government granted Juan José Warner, a naturalized American-Mexican citizen, nearly 45,000 acres (180 km^{2}) of the land on November 28, 1844. Warner, like most other large landholders in California at the time, depended primarily on Indian labor. The villagers of Kúpa provided most of Warner's workforce on his cattle ranch. The Cupeño continued to reside at what the Spanish called Agua Caliente after the American occupation of California in 1847 to 1848, during the Mexican–American War. They built an adobe ranch house in 1849 and barn in 1857, that were still standing as of 1963.

According to Julio Ortega, one of the oldest members of the Cupeño tribe, Warner set aside about 16 miles (26 km) of land surrounding the hot springs as the private domain of the Indians. Warner encouraged the Cupeño to construct a stone fence around their village and to keep their livestock separated from that of the ranch. Ortega felt that if the village had created its own boundaries, the Cupeño would still live there today.

=== American occupation ===
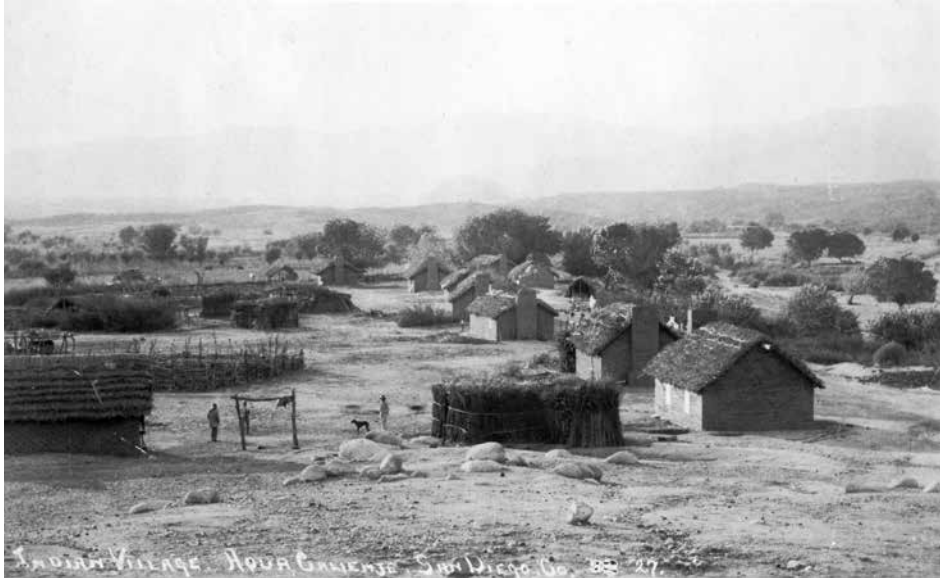
The Cupeño village of Cupa in 1893

In observing the Cupeño's living conditions in 1846, W. H. Emory, a brevet major with the United States Army Corps of Engineers, described the Indians as being held in a state of serfdom by Warner, and as being ill-treated. In 1849, Warner was arrested by the American forces for consorting with the Mexican government and was taken to Los Angeles.

In 1851, because of several issues of conflict, Antonio Garra, a Yuma Indian living at Warner's Ranch, tried to organize a coalition of various southern California Indian tribes to drive out all of the European Americans.

=== Forced eviction ===
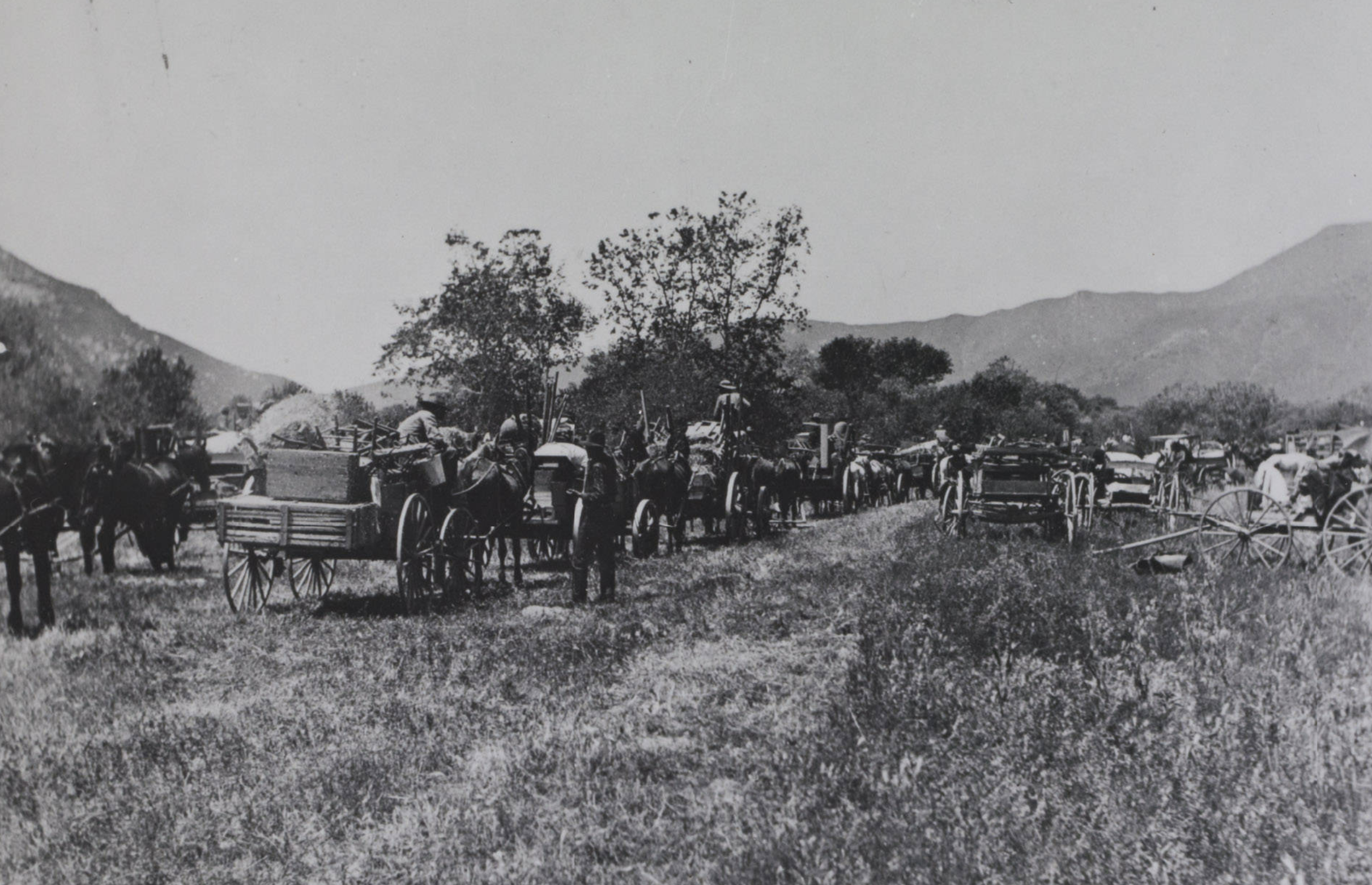
Forced relocation from Warner's Ranch to Pala, 1903

Following European contact but prior to the time of their eviction, the Cupeños sold milk, fodder, and craftwork to travelers on the Southern Immigrant Trail and passengers on the stagecoaches of the Butterfield Overland Mail, that stopped at Warner's Ranch and passed through the valley. The women made lace and took in laundry, which they washed in the hot springs. The men carved wood and manufactured saddle pads for horses. They also raised cattle and cultivated 200 acres (0.81 km^{2}) of land. In 1880, after numerous suits and countersuits, European-American John G. Downey acquired all titles to the main portion of Warner's Ranch.

In 1892, Downey, the former governor of California and owner of the ranch since 1880, began proceedings to evict the Cupeño from the ranch property. Legal proceedings continued until 1903, when the court ruled in Barker v. Harvey against the Cupeño. The United States government offered to buy new land for the Cupeño, but they refused. In 1903, Cecilio Blacktooth, Cupeño chief at Agua Caliente, said: "If you give us the best place in the world, it is not as good as this. This is our home. We cannot live anywhere else; we were born here, and our fathers are buried here."

==== Cupeño trail of tears ====
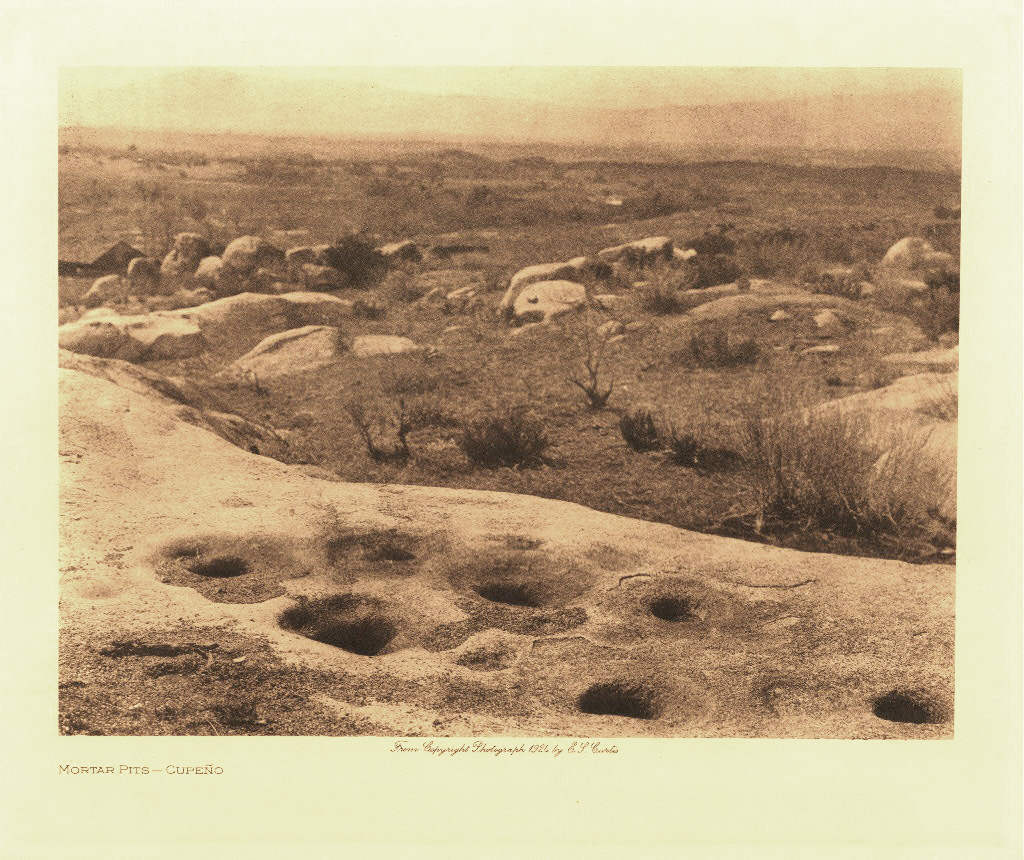
Cupeño rock mortars for grinding acorns

On May 13, 1903, the Cupa Indians were forced to move 75 miles (121 km) away, to Pala, California on the San Luis Rey River It has been referred to by the Los Angeles Times, academics, and the Pala Band of Mission Indians as the Cupeño trail of tears given the traumatic nature of the event. The forced relocation to the Pala reservation also included "the Luiseño villages at Puerta la Cruz and La Puerta, and the Kumeyaay villages at Mataguay, San José, and San Felipe." It was described by historian Phil Brigandi as "the last of Indian 'removals' in the United States, ending a federal policy of forced relocations that had begun 75 years earlier.

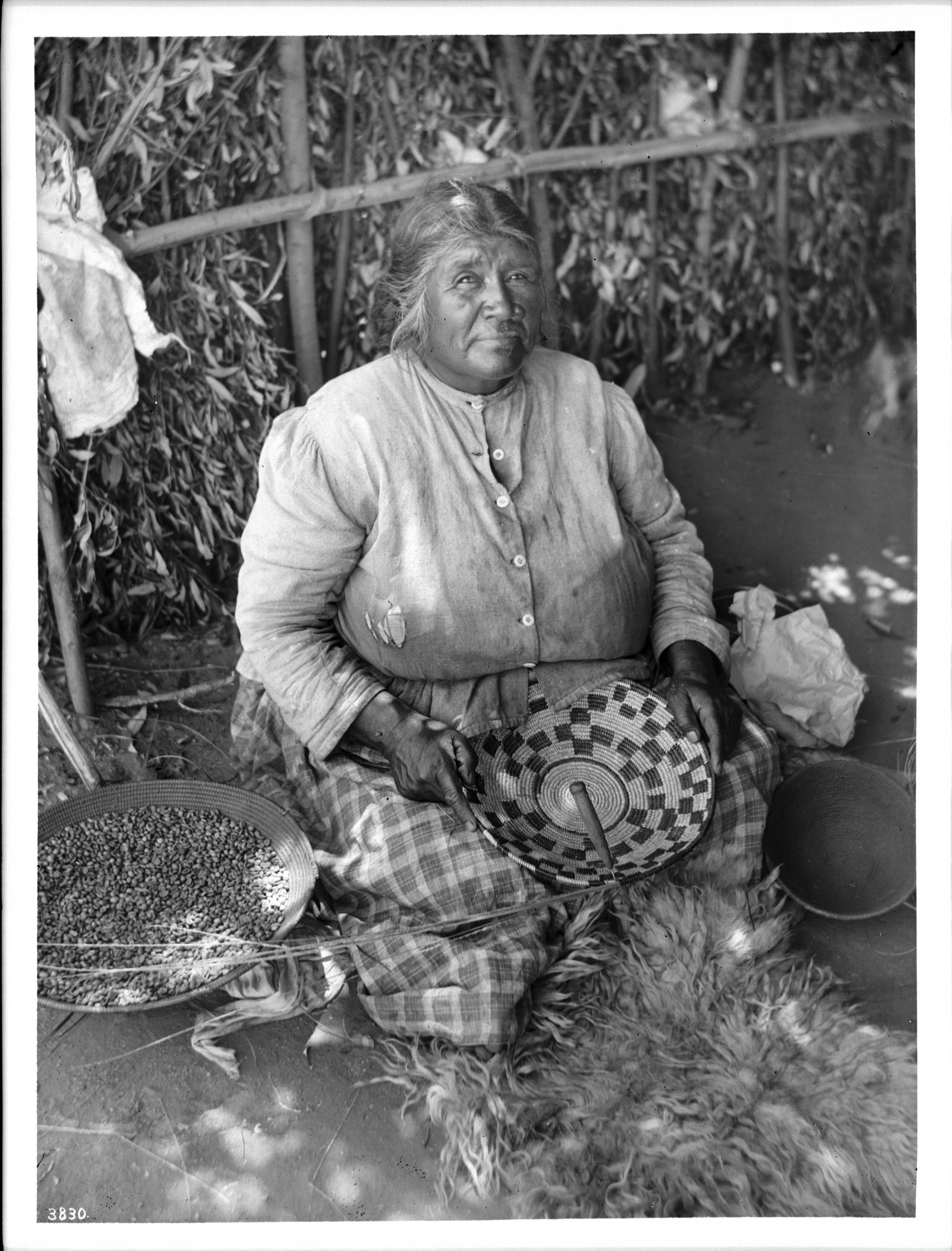
Mercedes Nolásquez, a Cupeño basket maker at Warner's Ranch, ca. 1900

===== Reactions =====
On the morning of the removal Roscinda Nolásquez, who was eleven years old at the time, recalled the last morning at Cupa. Orders were shouted in English at the Cupeño: “We were so scared. We didn’t know what he was saying. We didn’t know what was going on. We saw old people running back and forth. We cried, too, because we were afraid.” She recalls that morning trying to ensure that her cats would not be left behind, which she managed to find.

In 1903, an article for the Los Angeles Herald described it as such: “The springs proved the Indians’ undoing. White men wanted them, and now, after years of impatient waiting, they have possession. No matter the legal aspect of the case, the act is deplorable. It is one of the saddest sequels to the white man’s first notice to the [natives] on the Atlantic coast to move on. They have been moving on ever since.” An article for the Los Angeles Daily Times featured the headline: "Indians Bundled Away Like Cattle To Pala."

Two weeks after the forced relocation, American journalist Grant Wallace wrote, “Many of the older people were still ‘muy triste....’ Every other tent or brush ramada was still a ‘house of tears,’ for their love of home is stronger than with us.” The houses provided by the U.S. government were Ducker Patent Portable Houses; described in a report to the Indian Office as "very unsatisfactory," some of which quickly fell into disrepair or collapsed. In 1922, the Henshaw Dam was built, which significantly worsened the flow of the San Luis Rey River that ran through the relocation site.

==== Present-day ====
Indians at the present-day reservations of Los Coyotes, San Ygnacio, Santa Ysabel, and Mesa Grande are among descendants of the Warner Springs Cupeño. Many Cupeño believe that their land at Kúpa will be returned to them. They are seeking legal relief to that end. The Cupa site serves as a rallying point for the land claims movement of contemporary Indian people, particularly their effort to regain cultural and religious areas.

== Culture ==
The tribe is divided into two moieties, the Coyote and Wildcat, which are divided into several patrilineal clans. Clans are led by hereditary male clan leaders and assistant leaders. Marriages were traditionally arranged. Traditional foods included acorns, cactus fruit, seeds, berries, deer, quail, rabbits, and other small game.

The Cupa Cultural Center was founded in 1974 in Pala and underwent a major expansion in 2005. The center exhibits artwork; hosts classes and activities such as basket making and beading; and offers Cupeño language classes. During the first weekend of every May, Cupa Days is celebrated at the cultural center.

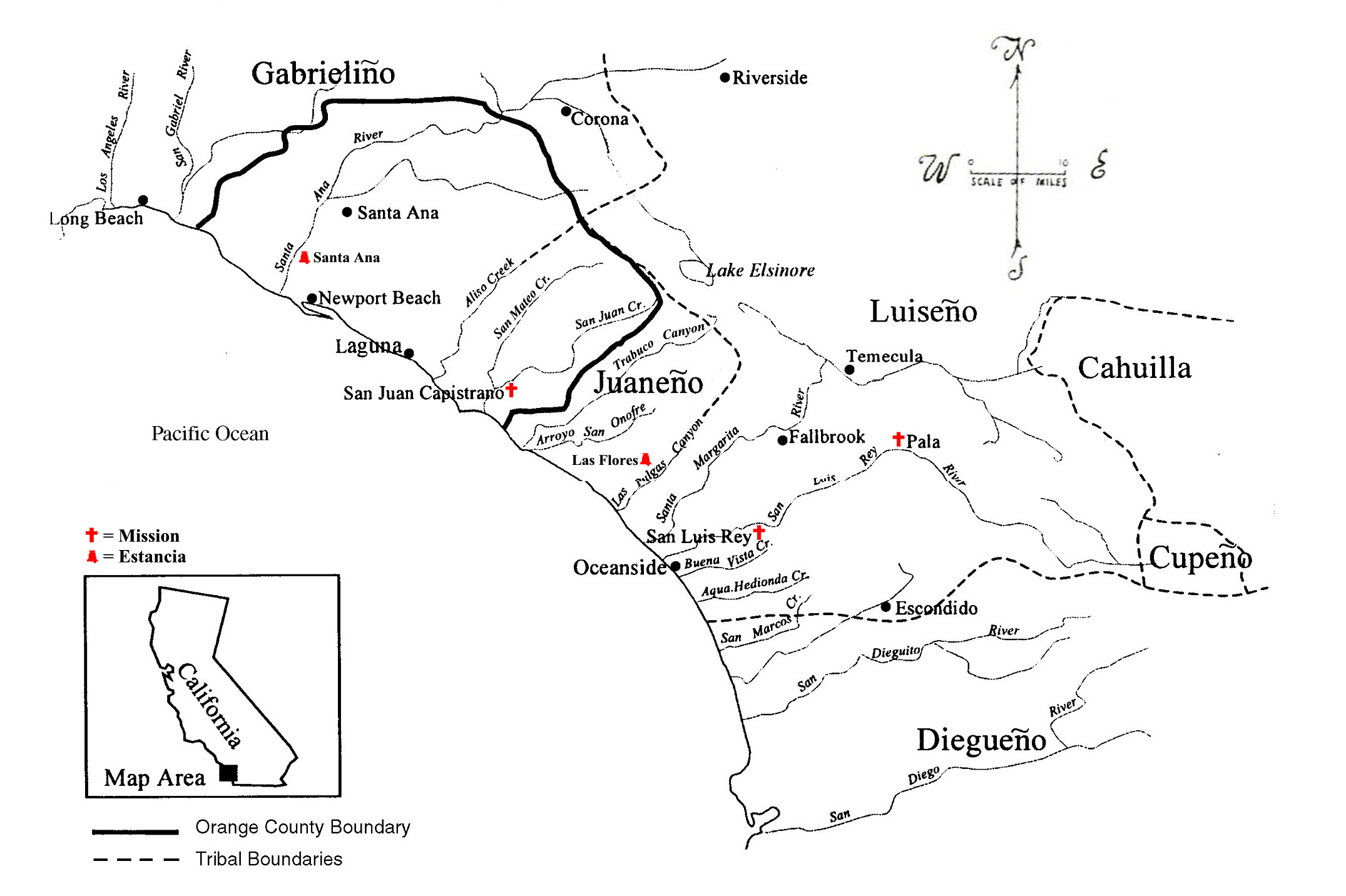
The territorial boundaries of the Southern California Indian tribes based on dialect, including the Cupeño language

== Language ==
The Cupeño language belongs to the Cupan group, which includes the Cahuilla and Luiseño languages. This grouping is of the Takic branch within the Uto-Aztecan family of languages. Roscinda Nolásquez (1892–1987), of Mexican Yaqui descent, is considered the last truly fluent Cupeño speaker. The language today is widely regarded as being extinct. In 1994, linguist Leanne Hinton estimated one to five people still spoke Cupeño, and nine people in the 1990 US census said they spoke the language. Educational materials for the language exist and young people still learn to sing in Cupeño, particularly Bird Songs.

== Population ==
Alfred L. Kroeber estimated the 1770 population of the Cupeño as 500. Lowell John Bean and Charles R. Smith put the total in 1795 between 500 and 750. By 1910, the Cupeño population had dropped to 150, according to Kroeber. Later estimates have suggested that there were fewer than 150 Cupeño in 1973, but about 200 in 2000.

== Notable people ==
- Marigold Linton (born 1936), cognitive psychologist
- Roscinda Nolásquez (1892–1987), last speaker of the Cupeño language
- Philip J. "Woodchuck" Welmas (1891-1968), football player
- Kilma Sibimoat Lattin (born 1978), leader, businessman, and military veteran
