= Jane H. Hill =

American linguist (1939–2018)

Jane Hassler Hill
- Born: Frances Jane Hassler; October 27, 1939; Berkeley, California, U.S.
- Died: November 2, 2018 (aged 79); Tucson, Arizona, U.S.
- Education: B.A., UC Berkeley, 1960; Ph.D, UCLA, 1966.
- Occupation: Professor
- Employers: Wayne State University (1968–1983); University of Arizona (1983–2009)
- Known for: Linguistic Anthropology; Descriptive Linguistics; Uto-Aztecan Languages
- Notable work: The Everyday Language of White Racism; A Grammar of Cupeño; Hasta la Vista Baby: Anglo Spanish in the American Southwest
- Spouse: Kenneth C. Hill
- Honours: President, American Anthropological Association (1997–1999)

Frances Jane Hassler Hill (October 27, 1939 – November 2, 2018) was an American anthropologist and linguist who worked extensively with Native American languages of the Uto-Aztecan language family and anthropological linguistics of North American communities.

== Early life and career ==
Hill was born Frances Jane Hassler in Berkeley, California to Gerald L. Hassler and Mildred E. Mathias on October 27, 1939. Her family moved to Binghamton, New York during World War II, then returned to California when the war ended in the late 1940s. At this time, both of her parents were on staff at UCLA: her father in the Department of Engineering and her mother as director of the botanical garden, which now bears her name (see Mildred E. Mathias Botanical Garden).

Hill began her post-secondary education at Reed College, which she attended for two years before transferring to University of California, Berkeley. She received her B.A. from UC Berkeley in 1960, then matriculated at UCLA to pursue her Ph.D. There she studied under influential figures in anthropology and linguistics including Harry Hoijer and William Bright. She met her husband, Kenneth C. Hill, in Hoijer's historical linguistics course in 1961. The Hills married in 1962 and had the first of three children that year. Hill finished her dissertation in 1966. The Hills then moved to Ann Arbor, MI, where Kenneth worked in the Department of Linguistics at the University of Michigan. Hill worked at Wayne State University in the Department of Anthropology from 1968 to 1983, eventually becoming head of the department. She took a sabbatical from 1974 to 1975, as did Kenneth, and they used this time to begin work on Nahuatl. In 1983, she moved to Tucson, AZ to work at the University of Arizona as a professor of Anthropology and Linguistics. While at the University, Hill received awards from the American Academy of Arts and Sciences, the American Association for the Advancement of Science, the Wenner-Gren Foundation, and the American Anthropological Association. From 1997 to 1999 she served as president of the American Anthropological Association. Around this time, Hill also successfully championed a program at the University of Arizona that would allow for a joint Ph.D. in anthropology and linguistics, a testimony to her influence in and passion for both disciplines. In 2009 she retired as Regents' Professor Emerita of Anthropology and Linguistics at the University of Arizona, but continued to work on a variety of research projects until her death.

Hill published more than 100 articles and chapters, as well as eight books, spanning many sub-disciplines of both linguistics and anthropology. Her work in descriptive linguistics, especially focused on languages spoken by American indigenous people, also made important contributions to discussions of language policy and language endangerment. She contributed to the fields of linguistic anthropology and socio-linguistics, researching the use of Mock Spanish and the intersections of language, culture, identity, and power. Though Hill's intellectual pursuits were diverse, they all embodied her self-proclaimed commitment to linguistic and anthropological studies that have a real-world impact on people's understanding of languages and on the people that speak them.

== Native American languages ==
Hill's work with indigenous American languages began with her dissertation focused on the Cupeño language, a member of the Uto-Aztecan language family spoken in Southern California. Hill conducted fieldwork on Cupeño in 1962 and 1963 and wrote her dissertation on Cupeño, but A Grammar of Cupeño was not published until 2005. The grammar uses data elicited from Roscinda Nolasquez, the last living speaker of Cupeño, as well as field notes from other linguists that had previously studied the language. After Cupeño, Hill continued to work on indigenous American languages, especially those in danger of extinction. For instance, she collaborated with Ofelia Zepeda on the Tohono O'odham language and with her husband Kenneth C. Hill on the Nahuatl/Mexicano language (see List of Publications).

In addition to describing the grammar and structure of these languages, Hill also researched their history and sociopolitical context. She was initially drawn to these languages by their danger of extinction and the desire to assist in preserving them through documenting their grammar and vocabulary. Hill later expanded her work beyond descriptive linguistics to analyze sociolinguistic use of these languages, as well as the ways in which they are understood by those outside their linguistic community. She raised important questions about the way those advocating for endangered languages talk about the languages and people who speak them, and how their rhetoric may "inadvertently undermine [their] goals of advocacy".

== Linguistic anthropology and socio-linguistics ==
Outside of indigenous languages, Hill's other works often focused on the everyday uses of language in American society. Much of this work examined the way White Americans use language to subtly retain power and control. Hill's book Language, Race and White Public Space and her article "The Everyday Language of White Racism" discuss how White Americans use racial slurs, linguistic appropriation, and other rhetorical techniques to mark other ethnolinguistic groups as disordered and to imply a standard of whiteness. These works, and others by Hill, investigate how language can be used to obtain social or political capital, often by preventing others from obtaining it.

Hill's seminal contribution to the discussion of language and racism is her analysis of Mock Spanish, where white monolingual English speakers use preset, often grammatically incorrect Spanish phrases. Examples of Mock Spanish include Arnold Schwarzenegger's famous line in the Terminator movies: "Hasta la vista, baby", which is invoked in the title of Hill's 1993 publication "Hasta la vista baby: Anglo Spanish in the American Southwest". Hill noted the disconnect between this linguistic behavior and the social climate of monolingual language policy and education and anti-immigrant sentiment. She concluded that Mock Spanish, though seemingly benign, is used to "index and reproduce deep prejudices against Mexicans and Spanish speakers". Research on Mock Spanish was continued by Hill, Jennifer Roth-Gordon, Rusty Barrett, and Lauren Mason Carriss. The core theory has been extended to describe Mock Asian, Mock Ebonics, and others.

Hill's sociolinguistic work is not limited to English speakers, and works such as Speaking Mexicano: Dynamics of Syncretic Language in Central Mexico (co-authored with husband Kenneth C. Hill) and "The voices of Don Gabriel: Responsibility and self in a modern Mexicano narrative" address similar topics in the context of Nahuatl/Mexicano.

Hill's extensive work on endangered languages, as well as her broad interests across the fields of linguistics and anthropology have elicited comparison to Franz Boas, one of the most prominent figures in linguistic anthropology. In 2009, Hill was given the Franz Boas Award by the American Anthropological Association, and her work was cited repeatedly in Christopher Ball's "Boasian Legacies in Linguistic Anthropology: A Centenary Review of 2011", published in American Anthropologist in 2012.

== Professional accomplishments and awards ==
Title/Honor	Organization	Year
Fellow	American Academy of Arts and Sciences	1998
Fellow	American Association for the Advancement of Science	?
President	American Anthropological Association	1997–1999
President	Society for Linguistic Anthropology	1993–1995
President	Society for the Study of the Indigenous Languages of the Americas	2001
Viking Fund Medal in Anthropology	Wenner-Gren Foundation	2004
Franz Boas Award	American Anthropological Association	2009
Fellow	Royal Anthropological Institute	?
Fellow	Linguistic Society of America	2013

== List of publications ==
=== Descriptive linguistics ===
- "A peeking rule in Cupeño." Linguistic Inquiry (1970): 534–539.
- (with Roscinda Nolasquez) Mulu'wetam: the first people: Cupeño oral history and language. Banning, Calif.: Malki Museum Press, 1973.
- (with Kenneth C. Hill) "Honorific usage in modern Nahuatl: the expression of social distance and respect in the Nahuatl of the Malinche Volcano area." Language (1978): 123–155.
- (with Kenneth C. Hill) "Mixed grammar, purist grammar, and language attitudes in modern Nahuatl." Language in society 9.03 (1980): 321–348.
- (with Kenneth C. Hill). Speaking Mexicano: Dynamics of Syncretic Language in Central Mexico. University of Arizona Press, 1986.
- "The flower world of old Uto-Aztecan." Journal of Anthropological Research 48.2 (1992): 117–144.
- (with Ofelia Zepeda) "Derived words in Tohono O'odham." International Journal of American Linguistics 58.4 (1992): 355–404.
- "Today there is no respect: Nostalgia, 'Respect,' and Oppositional Discourse in Mexicano (Nahuatl) Language Ideology." In Language Ideologies: Practice and Theory. BB Schieffelin, KA Woolard, and PV Kroskrity eds. (1998): 68–86.
- (with Ofelia Zepeda) "Tohono O'odham (Papago) plurals." Anthropological Linguistics (1998): 1–42.
- (with Ofelia Zepeda) "Language, gender, and biology: Pulmonic ingressive airstream in Tohono O'odham women's speech." Southwest Journal of Linguistics 18 (1999): 15–40.
- (with José Luis Moctezuma, eds.). Avances y balances de lenguas yutoaztecas. Homenaje a Wick R. Miller. México, Instituto Nacional de Antropología e Historia, 2001.
- "Proto-Uto-Aztecan: A community of cultivators in Central Mexico?." American Anthropologist 103.4 (2001): 913–934.
- "Toward a linguistic prehistory of the Southwest: 'Azteco-Tanoan' and the arrival of maize cultivation." Journal of Anthropological Research 58.4 (2002): 457–475.
- A Grammar of Cupeño. Vol. 136. University of California Press, 2005.
- "Northern Uto-Aztecan and Kiowa-Tanoan: Evidence of contact between the proto-languages?." International Journal of American Linguistics 74.2 (2008): 155–188.

=== Sociolinguistics and linguistic anthropology ===
- Foreign accents, language acquisition, and cerebral dominance revisited." Language Learning 20.2 (1970): 237–248.
- "On the evolutionary foundations of language." American Anthropologist 74.3 (1972): 308–317.
- "Possible continuity theories of language." Language (1974): 134–150.
- "Apes and language." Annual Review of Anthropology 7.1 (1978): 89–112.
- "Language contact systems and human adaptations." Journal of Anthropological Research 34.1 (1978): 1–26.
- "Review: Language and learning: The debate between Jean Piaget and Noam Chomsky, by Massimo Piattelli-Palmarini." Language 57.4 (1981): 948–953.
- "Language death in Uto-Aztecan." International Journal of American Linguistics 49.3 (1983): 258–276.
- "The grammar of consciousness and the consciousness of grammar." American Ethnologist 12.4 (1985): 725–737.
- "The refiguration of the anthropology of language." Cultural Anthropology 1.1 (1986): 89–102.
- "Language, culture, and world view." Linguistics: the Cambridge Survey 4 (1989): 14–37.
- (with Ofelia Zepeda) "The condition of Native American languages in the United States." Diogenes 39.153 (1991): 45–65.
- (with Bruce Mannheim). "Language and world view." Annual Review of Anthropology 21.1 (1992): 381–404.
- "Hasta la vista, baby: Anglo Spanish in the American Southwest." Critique of Anthropology, 13.2 (1993): 145–176.
- "Is it really 'No Problemo'? Junk Spanish and Anglo Racism" Texas Linguistic Forum. No. 33. University of Texas, Department of Linguistics, 1993.
- (with Judith T. Irvine). Responsibility and Evidence in Oral Discourse. No. 15. Cambridge University Press, 1993.
- "Structure and practice in language shift." In Progression and Regression in Language: Sociocultural, Neuropsychological and Linguistic Perspectives, Hyltenstam and Viberg eds. (1993): 68–93.
- "Junk Spanish, covert racism, and the (leaky) boundary between public and private spheres." Pragmatics 5.2 (1995): 197–212.
- "The voices of Don Gabriel: Responsibility and self in a modern Mexicano narrative." In The Dialogic Emergence of Culture. Dennis Tedlock and Bruce Mannheim, eds. Urbana: University of Illinois Press, 1995. 97–147.
- "Languages on the land: toward an anthropological dialectology." (Lecture given March 21, 1996).
- "Language, race, and white public space." American Anthropologist 100.3 (1998): 680–689.
- "Styling locally, styling globally: What does it mean?." Journal of Sociolinguistics 3.4 (1999): 542–556.
- "Syncretism." Journal of Linguistic Anthropology 9.1/2 (1999): 244–246.
- "'Expert rhetorics' in advocacy for endangered languages: Who is listening, and what do they hear?." Journal of Linguistic Anthropology 12.2 (2002): 119–133.
- "Finding culture in narrative." Finding Culture in Talk. Palgrave Macmillan US, 2005. 157–202.
- "Intertextuality as source and evidence for indirect indexical meanings." Journal of Linguistic Anthropology 15.1 (2005): 113–124.
- "The ethnography of language and language documentation." Essentials of Language Documentation. (2006): 113–128.
- The Everyday Language of White Racism. Malden, MA: Wiley-Blackwell, 2008.
