= Katherine Siva Saubel =

Native American leader and scholar

- Born: Katherine Siva; March 7, 1920
- Died: November 1, 2011 (aged 91); Morongo Reservation, California, U.S.
- Resting place: Saint Marys Catholic Cemetery; Morongo Reservation; 33.960365°N 116.825737°W
- Citizenship: Los Coyotes Band of Cahuilla and Cupeno Indians and U.S.
- Education: La Sierra University
- Occupations: Scholar; educator; tribal leader; author; activist
- Known for: Preservation of the Cahuilla language, culture and history
- Spouse: Mariano Saubel (m. 1940; died 1985)
- Children: 1

Katherine Siva Saubel (née Siva; March 7, 1920 – November 1, 2011) was a Native American scholar, educator, tribal leader, author, and activist committed to preserving her Cahuilla history, culture and language. Her efforts focused on preserving the language of the Cahuilla. Saubel is acknowledged nationally and internationally as one of California's most respected Native American leaders. She received an honorary PhD in philosophy from La Sierra University, Riverside, California, and was awarded the Chancellor's Medal, the highest honor bestowed by the University of California at the University of California, Riverside.

Saubel was an enrolled member of Los Coyotes Band of Cahuilla and Cupeno Indians and served as their tribal chairperson.

== Early life and education ==
Saubel, the eighth of eleven children, grew up speaking only the Cahuilla language until she entered school at age seven. Her mother, Melana Sawaxell, could only speak Cahuilla. Her father, Juan C. Siva, eventually mastered four languages: Cahuilla, Spanish, Latin, and English. While in high school, Katherine grew alarmed when she found that as she spoke Cahuilla to her friends, they would respond back to her in English. She worried that her people were losing their language. She began writing down the names and uses of the plants and herbs she learned from her mother as she gathered with her.

This notebook later became Temalpakh: (From the Earth) Cahuilla Indian knowledge and usage of plants that she collaborated on with anthropologist Dr. Lowell John Bean for ten years and was published by Malki Museum's Malki Press in 1972. Temalpakh demonstrates the depth of Saubel's expertise in the Cahuilla culture, and the second major focus of her scholarship: native ethnobotany, the study of the plant lore and agricultural customs of a people or specific ethnic group. Saubel was an expert on the unique uses Cahuilla made of plants such as mesquite, screw bean, oak, acorn, datura, and others.

== Further work ==
In 1962, Saubel worked with the professor of American linguistics, William Bright, on his studies of the Cahuilla language and as he prepared several publications. She also taught classes with Bright and with professor Pamela Munro of UCLA, and served as co-author with Munro on Chem’i’vullu: Let’s Speak Cahuilla, published by UCLA in 1981.

Starting in 1964, Saubel worked on Cahuilla language research with linguist Professor Hansjakob Seiler of the University of Cologne, Germany, to do further work on providing an authentic written translation of the Cahuilla language that had previously existed only in spoken form. Their work together resulted in the publication of both a Cahuilla reference grammar and dictionary. Saubel also published her own dictionary, I’sniyatam Designs, a Cahuilla Word Book. Her work includes several authentic transcriptions and English translations of Cahuilla folklore.

Jane Penn, a cultural leader on the Malki Cahuilla reservation at Banning, California (which was renamed Morongo Reservation), had conceived in 1958 of opening a reservation museum where she could display her extensive collection of Cahuilla artifacts and create a cultural preservation center for the reservation. With the help of Lowell John Bean, who was an anthropology graduate student at that time, and the support of Penn's husband Elmer and Saubel's husband Mariano, the group obtained non-profit status for Malki Museum on the Morongo Indian Reservation in Banning, California. Saubel, Penn's relative by marriage, was asked to become the president of Malki, while Penn became its director and treasurer. The first nonprofit museum on an Indian reservation opened its doors to the public in February 1965 and continues to display artifacts from prehistoric to recent times. Malki Press, the museum's publishing arm, recently purchased Ballena Press from authors Lowell John Bean and Sylvia Brakke Vane, enabling the museum to continue to publish scholarly works on Southern California's Native Americans.

== Recognition ==
Saubel's research has appeared internationally in government, academic, and museum publications. Her knowledge of Cahuilla ethnobotany and tribal affairs has prompted US state and federal legislative committees to seek out her testimony. Past and current governors of California have honored her, and she has been appointed to numerous commissions and agencies.

For many years, she served on the Riverside County Historical Commission, which selected her County Historian of the Year in 1986. In 1987, she was recognized as "Elder of the Year" by the California State Indian Museum. Governor Jerry Brown appointed her to the California Native American Heritage Commission in 1982. In this capacity, she has worked to preserve sacred sites and protect Indian remains.

Saubel has testified as an expert on Native American culture and history to the California legislature, the United States Congress, and various boards, commissions, and agencies.

Her writings have been published by government agencies, academic institutions, and museums, and she has taught Cahuilla history, literature, and culture at UC Riverside, UCLA, California State University, Hayward, the University of Cologne, and Hachinohe University in Japan. In 2004 her book, Isill Heqwas Waxizh: A Dried Coyote's Tail, co-authored with Cahuilla, Cupeno, Luiseño, and Serrano linguist Dr. Eric Elliot, was published by Malki Museum Press.

Her awards include:

- First Recipient of the Smithsonian Institution National Museum of the American Indian Art and Culture Award (1994)
- California State Indian Museum – Elder of the Year (1987)
- The Desert Protective Council Award
- YWCA Woman of Achievement Award (Riverside County, California)
- Bridge To Peace Award
- Latino and Native American Hall of Fame (Riverside, California)
- First Recipient of the California Indian Heritage Preservation Award by the Society for California Archaeology (2000)
- Indian of the Year – California Indian Conference (2000)
- First Native American woman inducted into the National Women's Hall of Fame in Seneca Falls, New York (1993)

== Publications ==
- Saubel, Katherine Siva and Paul Apodaca. “Founding a Tribal Museum: The Malki Museum” in American Indian Places: A Guide to American Indian Landmarks, edited by Francis Kennedy. New York: Houghton Mifflin, 2008.
- Saubel, Katherine Siva and Pamela Munro. Chem'ivillu' (Let's Speak Cahuilla), edited by UCLA: American Indian Studies Center, 1979.
- Saubel, Katherine Siva and Lowell John Bean. Temalpakh (From the Earth): Cahuilla Indian Knowledge and Usage of Plants. Banning, California: Malki Museum Press, 1972.
- Saubel, Katherine Siva (1977). I'isniyatam = Designs: a Cahuilla word book. Banning, CA: Malki Museum Press, Morongo Indian Reservation. p. 32. OCLC 6392692.
- Saubel, Katherine Siva; Eric Elliot (2004). Isill héqwas wáxish = A dried coyote's tail. Banning, CA: Malki Museum Press. p. 1385. ISBN 978-0939046409. OCLC 58432017.
