= Pala Casino Spa Resort =

Resort and casino in Pala, California, United States

Coordinates: 33.363°N 117.084°W

- Interactive map of Pala Casino Spa Resort
- Location: 11154 Highway 76 Pala, California 92059 USA
- Opened: April 3, 2001
- No. of rooms: 500 (82 suites)
- Gaming space: 86,000-square-foot (8,000 m^{2})
- Signature attractions: Center Bar; Infinity; Palomar Starlight Theater
- Notable restaurants: The Oak Room; Pala Café; Choices The Buffet; Noodles; Coffee Amoré; CAVE • Dining • Lounge • Wine Cave; Poolside Café & Bar; Grinding Stone Pizza
- Casino type: Land
- Owner: Pala Band of Mission Indians
- Website: http://www.palacasino.com

Pala Casino Spa Resort is a casino hotel and spa in Pala, California, on the Pala Indian Reservation northeast of San Diego. It is owned and operated by the Pala Band of Mission Indians, a federally recognized tribe.

The casino has 86,000 square-feet of casino floor, 2,250 slot machines, 84 table games, 9 restaurants, an 11,000-square-foot (1,000 m^{2}) day spa, and 4 entertainment venues. The hotel has 500 rooms and 82 suites.

== History ==
In March 2000, construction began on the $115 million Pala Casino, which opened in April, 2001. On August 19, 2003, Pala Casino Spa & Resort opened with 500 rooms, a spa, and a conference center. The project cost around $105 million to complete.

== Dining ==
There are nine restaurants located within Pala Casino Spa Resort.

== See also ==
- List of casinos in California
- List of casino hotels
