= KPRI =

Classic hits community radio station in Pala, California

- Pala, California; United States
- Broadcast area: San Diego, California
- Frequency: 91.3 MHz
- Branding: Rez Radio 91.3

Programming
- Format: Classic Hits
- Affiliations: Pacifica radio

Ownership
- Owner: Pala Band of Mission Indians

History
- First air date: 2010
- Former call signs: KUUP (2009); KOPA (2009–2018)
- Call sign meaning: Kupa Pala Rez Indians

Technical information
- Licensing authority: FCC
- Facility ID: 173244
- Class: A
- ERP: 160 watts
- HAAT: −325 meters (−1,066 ft)
- Transmitter coordinates: 33°22′00″N 117°04′05″W

Links
- Public license information: Public file; LMS
- Webcast: Listen live
- Website: rezradio.fm

KPRI (91.3 FM) is a community radio station licensed to serve the community of Pala, California. The station is owned by the Pala Band of Mission Indians, it began operating under program test authority in December 2010, and received its broadcast license on February 3, 2011.

The station is branded and only referred to on-air as "Rez Radio 91.3". Rez Radio broadcasts a mixture of local public affairs programming and music for the community of Pala. The primary mission of Rez Radio is to be a contact point in case of an emergency to pass information to the listeners. The station has broadcast local softball games, Native American language lessons, and locally produced music, and other items of interest.

== History ==
The original push to build a radio station on the Pala Indian Reservation came about in 2007 in response to the need for better communication throughout the reservation during the wildfires (see Witch Fire) in San Diego. Pala Tribal Council leader Kilma S. Lattin approached the Tribal Council with the plan and secured funding. The station received its original construction permit from the Federal Communications Commission (FCC) on January 29, 2009.

The station was assigned the call sign KUUP by the Federal Communications Commission on March 30, 2009. While still under construction, the station was assigned new call sign KOPA on May 6, 2009. The call sign was changed to KPRI on March 23, 2018, with the initials standing for "Kupa Pala Rez Indians". Kupa is the name of the ancestral home near Warner Springs of the majority of the Pala tribe.

The station applied to the FCC for its license to cover on December 3, 2010, and the FCC accepted this application for filing on December 6, 2010. This application was amended on January 12, 2011, and on February 3, 2011, the FCC issued the station its broadcast license. KOPA signed on as "Pala Rez Radio 91.3" on February 3, 2011.

Initially the station featured a mix of music, talk radio, and cultural programs. Lattin hosted a talk show called "The Pala Nation" and hired John Fox as station master.

Select programming and IDs, including hourly time checks are spoken in Pa'enexily, the traditional language of the Cupeños.

== See also ==
- List of community radio stations in the United States
