= Los Coyotes Band of Cahuilla and Cupeno Indians =

Native Cahuilla and Cupeño Indians in Southern California

Los Coyotes Band of Cahuilla and Cupeño Indians
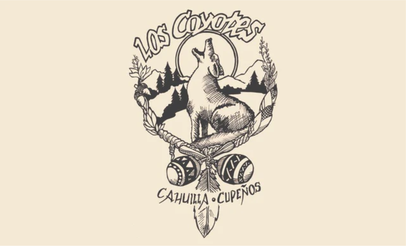

Total population
- 288

Regions with significant populations
- United States (California)

Languages
- English, Cahuilla language

Religion
- traditional tribal religion Christianity (Roman Catholicism)

Related ethnic groups
- other Cahuilla and Cupeño tribes

Los Coyotes Band of Cahuilla and Cupeño Indians of the Los Coyotes Reservation is a federally recognized tribe of Cahuilla and Cupeño Indians, who were located in California.

== Reservation ==
Location of Los Coyotes Reservation

Los Coyotes Reservation (33°17′52″N 116°33′22″W) is located in northeastern San Diego County. Of 400 enrolled tribal members, about 150 live on the reservation. It became federally recognized in 1889.

Their reservation is the largest in San Diego County. An 80-mile (130 km) drive from San Diego, the land is located between Anza-Borrego Desert State Park and the Cleveland National Forest. Hot Springs Mountain is located within the boundaries of the reservation with an elevation of 6,533 ft. Campgrounds are open to the public for a nominal entry fee.

== Government ==
Los Coyotes Band of Cahuilla and Cupeño Indians is headquartered in Warner Springs, California. It is governed by a democratically elected tribal council. Its current tribal spokesperson is Ray Chapparosa.

== Language ==
The Cahuilla and Cupeño languages are closely related and are part of the Takic language family. The Cupeño and Cahuilla languages are endangered. Alvino Siva, an enrolled tribal member and a fluent Cahuilla language speaker, died on June 26, 2009. He preserved the tribe's traditional bird songs, sung in the Cahuilla language, by teaching them to younger generations of Cahuilla people.

== Demographics ==
=== 2020 census ===
Los Coyotes Reservation, California – Racial and ethnic composition Note: the US Census treats Hispanic/Latino as an ethnic category. This table excludes Latinos from the racial categories and assigns them to a separate category. Hispanics/Latinos may be of any race.
Race / Ethnicity (NH = Non-Hispanic)	Pop 2000	Pop 2010	Pop 2020	% 2000	% 2010	% 2020
White alone (NH)	10	20	2	14.29%	20.41%	13.33%
Black or African American alone (NH)	0	0	1	0.00%	0.00%	6.67%
Native American or Alaska Native alone (NH)	56	70	3	80.00%	71.43%	20.00%
Asian alone (NH)	0	0	2	0.00%	0.00%	13.33%
Native Hawaiian or Pacific Islander alone (NH)	0	0	0	0.00%	0.00%	0.00%
Other race alone (NH)	0	0	0	0.00%	0.00%	0.00%
Mixed race or Multiracial (NH)	3	0	0	4.29%	0.00%	0.00%
Hispanic or Latino (any race)	1	8	7	1.43%	8.16%	46.67%
Total	70	98	15	100.00%	100.00%	100.00%

== Notable tribal members ==
- Katherine Siva Saubel (March 7, 1920 – November 1, 2011), scholar of Indian language and culture, co-founder of the Malki Museum, and former Los Coyotes tribal chairperson
