= Cupeño traditional narratives =

Cupeño traditional narratives include myths, legends, tales, and oral histories preserved by the Cupeño people, of present-day inland San Diego County in Southern California.

Cupeño oral literature, including the creation myth, closely parallels that of Cupeño's Cahuilla linguistic kinsmen and of southern California Takic and Yuman groups in general.

== Sources for Cupeño narratives ==
- Bright, William. 1993. A Coyote Reader. University of California Press, Berkeley. (Includes a narrative based on Hill and Nolasquez 1973, pp. 60–64.)
- Gifford, Edward Winslow. 1918. "Clans and Moieties in Southern California". University of California Publications in American Archaeology and Ethnology 14:155-219. Berkeley. (Includes myths recorded in 1916–1917, pp. 192, 199–201.)
- Gifford, Edward Winslow, and Gwendoline Harris Block. 1930. California Indian Nights. Arthur H. Clark, Glendale, California. (One previously published narrative, pp. 251–253.)
- Hill, Jane H., and Rosinda Nolasquez. 1973. Mulu'wetam: The First People, Cupeño Oral History and Language. Malki Museum Press, Banning, California. (Assorted myths and other narratives collected by Paul-Louis Faye in 1919-1920 and Hill in 1962–1966, with comparative notes and analyses.)
- Kroeber, A. L. 1925. Handbook of the Indians of California. Bureau of American Ethnology Bulletin No. 78. Washington, D.C. (Creation myths, with comparisons, p. 692.)
- Luthin, Herbert W. 2002. Surviving through the Days: A California Indian Reader. University of California Press, Berkeley. ("The Life of Hawk Feather" from Hill and Nolasquez 1973, pp. 421–460.)
- Strong, William Duncan. 1929. "Aboriginal Society in Southern California". University of California Publications in American Archaeology and Ethnology 26:1-358. Berkeley. (Narratives from Manuela Griffith, pp. 268–273.)
