= Kilma S. Lattin =

American leader and businessman

Kilma Sibimoat Lattin
- Born: October 30, 1978 (age 47); La Jolla, California
- Education: University of California, Santa Barbara (UCSB) (BA); University of Southern California (USC) (MBA)
- Military career
- Allegiance: United States
- Branch: United States Army
- Service years: 2001-2006
- Rank: Sergeant (2001-2002); Second Lieutenant (2002-2004); First Lieutenant (2004-2006)
- Units: 145th Aviation Regiment; 1/18th Air Cavalry
- Awards: Soldier's Medal for Valor
- Other work: Regional Emmy Award for "Defending the Homeland"

Kilma Sibimoat Lattin (October 30, 1978) is a Native American leader, businessman, and military veteran. He is a member of the Pala Band of Mission Indians in San Diego, California, where he was elected to multiple terms of office on both the executive committee and the tribal council between 2006 and 2012.

== Early life and education ==
Lattin was born in La Jolla, part of San Diego, California He spent part of his early childhood in La Jolla and part on the Pala Indian Reservation. He graduated from La Jolla High School in 1996. He earned a bachelor's degree in history from UC Santa Barbara in 2002. While in college he served in the Army Reserve Officers' Training Corps. Lattin earned a Masters of Business Administration from the Marshall School of Business in cooperation with University of Southern California.

== Family military heritage ==
Lattin's family has served in the military for multiple generations. Lattin's paternal grandfather, Roy A. Lattin Sr., was a Private First Class in the United States Marine Corps (USMC) and fought in the Battle of Guadalcanal.

== Military career ==
Lattin joined began his military service in the U.S. Army as both a Non-Commissioned Officer, Sergeant, and Cadet in the Reserve Officer Training Corps. As a Sergeant, Lattin's first station was in the 3-140th Aviation, a CH-47 Chinook Company located in Stockton, California. In 2002, Lattin earned a full commission as an Aviation Officer in the United States Army's Air Cavalry, the 1-18th AIR CAV based out of Los Alamitos, California. Lattin was eventually qualified to fly the OH-58 Kiowa and the AH-64 Apache attack helicopter. He served in the 145th Aviation Regiment, 1-18th AIR CAV at Fort Rucker, and was honorably discharged in 2006 for a service-related knee injury.

=== Soldier's Medal ===
In April 2003 while en route to a flight school training session at Fort Rucker, Lattin saw a woman on the side of the road who was engulfed in flames. This was later revealed to have been caused by to an accident with a gas mower. The woman had panicked and run, causing the flames to spread. Lattin jumped out of his vehicle and saved her life by pushing her to the ground and extinguishing the flames with his body and the freshly-mowed grass. During this incident, Lattin sustained 2nd-degree burns over his face, arms, and neck. He was recognized for the deed with a Distinguished Citizen Award by the City of Enterprise, Alabama, and presented with the Soldier's Medal for Valor by the Commanding General Officer of Fort Rucker, the U.S. Army's flight school.

=== Citation ===
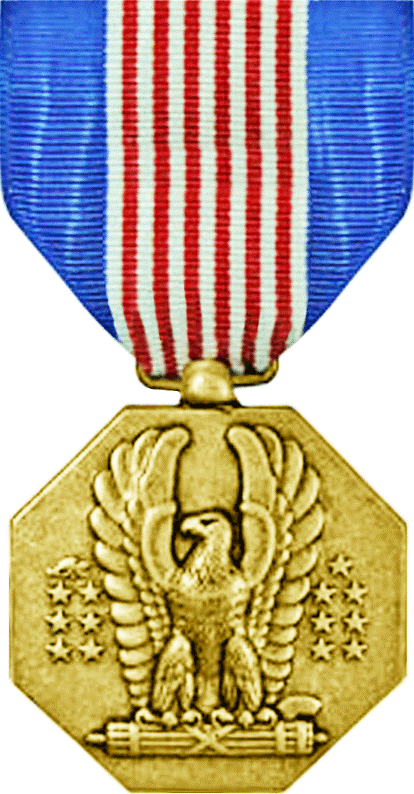

The President of the United States of America, authorized by Act of Congress, July 2, 1926, takes pleasure in presenting the Soldier's Medal to Second Lieutenant Kilma Sibimoat Lattin, United States Army, for heroism at the risk of life not involving conflict with an armed enemy above and beyond the call of duty on 17 April 2003. Second Lieutenant Lattin exhibited unparalleled heroism by sacrificing his personal safety and risking his own life to save the life of a woman who was fully engulfed in flames. Despite injuries repeatedly sustained during his instantaneous response, Second Lieutenant Lattin used his body to extinguish the fire and save the woman's life. His unhesitating bravery and selfless action in the face of life-threatening danger are hallmarks of true heroic conduct and an example of being truly "Above the Best." Second Lieutenant Lattin's actions reflect great credit upon himself, Delta Company, 1-145th Aviation Regiment, and the United States Army.

== Native American leadership and advocacy ==
=== Technology leadership ===
In 2020, Lattin co-founded OurWorlds, a Native American education technology company. The company has won awards from South by Southwest Edu (2022 SXSW EDU 2022) and the San Diego County Engineering Council.

=== Tribal leadership ===
Starting in 2006, Lattin held various leadership roles on the Pala Reservation, including a position in the Tribal Council, various boards, and in delegations to the National Congress of American Indians and National Indian Gaming Commission. In 2012, he worked with Principal Deputy Assistant Secretary of Indian Affairs John Tahsuda to draft domestic policy positions for the 2012 Presidential Campaign.

=== Pala Skatepark ===
In 2007, Lattin led an effort to raise $600,000 and hired skatepark architect Wally Hollyday to design and build a new 22,000-square-foot skatepark that included bowls, ramps, rails, and a kidney-shaped pool within the existing Pala Reservation sports complex. Completed in 2018, the Pala Skatepark was featured in the touring exhibition "Ramp It Up: Skateboard Culture in Native America" which showed at the Smithsonian's National Museum of the American Indian Washington, D.C. location and its New York City location in 2009 and 2010, with a national tour in 2012–2015.

=== Native American veterans advocacy ===
Lattin founded the Pala Veterans Organization which provides Pala veterans with a community and meeting schedule which has provided a much-needed outlet in which to share their experiences with other veterans, and subsequently conceived of and produced a documentary titled, Defending The Homeland about their service in the military. It won a Regional Emmy Award in 2013.

== See also ==
- KPRI, the first Native-American-owned radio station in southern California
- List of Native Americans of the United States
- Harvard Business School, Executive Education
