= Roscinda Nolásquez =

Last speaker of the Cupeño language of Southern California

Roscinda Nolásquez (1892 – February 4, 1987) was a Cupeño, and the last speaker of the Cupeño language of Southern California. She grew up speaking Cupeño and Spanish. It was not until she was forcefully sent to Sherman Indian School, previously Perris Indian School, in her early teens that she learned English. In 1903, the Cupeño people had to relocate to the Pala Indian Reservation where Nolásquez lived much of rest of her life. In the early 1960s, she continued to speak Cupeño with several elderly residents in Pala.

Nolásquez made a serious effort late in her life to help document and preserve the Cupeño language, working among others with linguists Jane Hill and Roderick Jacobs. Together with Hill she edited a collection of bilingual Cupeño-English oral histories.

== Works ==
- Hill, Jane; Nolasquez, R. (1973). Mulu'wetam: the First People: Cupeño Oral History and Language. Malki Museum Press.
- Roscinda Nolasquez and Anne Galloway (1975): I'i Muluwet: First Book of Words in the Cupeño Indian Language of Southern California. Pala, Calif: Alderbooks.
