= Phil Brigandi =

American independent scholar (1959-2019)

Phil Brigandi (1959-2019) was an independent scholar specializing in the history of Southern California with a focus on the Orange County area who published 26 books from 1982 to 2018. For 30 years he served as the historian for Hemet, California's Ramona Pageant and was Orange County's archivist for five years, starting in 2003. His books were published through Arcadia Publishing, Heritage Media, local natural history organizations, and the University of Oklahoma Press.

Throughout his life he spoke about the importance of local history and its ability to create a sense of place. After his death in 2019, he was memorialized in articles for the Los Angeles Times, The Orange County Register, and elsewhere. He was regularly cited in numerous articles for various local city and county newspapers and magazines for his expertise. He maintained a website OC Historyland until his passing.

== Personal life ==
Brigandi had been a researcher since 1975, who grew up in the city of Orange, California. He graduated from Orange High School in 1977 and from California State University, Fullerton in 1982 with a degree in history. He published his first book at the age of 23. Brigandi regularly preserved historical writings, such as newspaper clippings from offices that were due to be destroyed. He enjoyed hiking and never owned a cellphone.

In 2003, he became Orange County's official archivist, an office that had been closed since 1995 due to the county's bankruptcy. He told the Orange County Register, "Local history is important because it provides a connection to where we live, a sense of place. We need people committed to deal with the issues in our neighborhoods. We need to encourage a connection to place.”

Brigandi was a member of the Boy Scouts for most of his life. He became a Cub Scout in 1967, earned the rank of Eagle Scout, and served as a Section Chief in the Order of the Arrow. In 1975, Brigandi first joined the staff of Lost Valley Scout Reservation (the Orange County Council's summer camp), and continued to be involved with Lost Valley until his death.

In 2012, fellow local historian Jim Sleeper died, who The Orange County Register referred to as the county's first historian. Brigandi had known Sleeper for about 35 years, and commented, "He wrote like the person he was. He had a wry sense of humor and his own way of looking at the world."

Brigandi died on December 12, 2019, due to complications of a heart attack. After Brigandi's passing, his brother Chris noted, "Phil found a purpose and passion at a young age, and he loved what he did. He stayed true to himself and was a kind and loving human being. His good work was far-reaching and beneficial to many. He is deeply missed."

== Publications ==
- A History of Lost Valley and the Surrounding Area (1979)
- Trails of the Lost Valley Area (1981) (second edition [1984] combines Rock Climbing Notes from the Lost Valley Area [with John Nordenstam])
- The Plaza. A Local Drama in Five Acts (1982)
- Looking Back . . . on the Ramona Pageant (1985)
- A New Creation. The Incorporation of the City of Orange, 1888 (1988)
- A Place Called Home. Orange’s Architectural Legacy (with Karen Wilson Turnbull) (1990)
- The First 100 Years of West Orange Elementary (1990)
- Garnet Holme: California’s Pageant Master (1991)
- Prayers, Presence, Gifts and Service. A Centennial History of the Hemet United Methodist Church, 1894-1994 (1994)
- Orange, The City ‘Round the Plaza (1997)
- The Ramona Pageant. A Pictorial History, 1923-1998 (1997)
- Temecula, at the Crossroads of History (1998)
- First Church. A 125th Anniversary History of the First United Methodist Church of Orange (1998)
- Watson’s Drug Store. A Downtown Orange Tradition. A Centennial History, 1899-1999 (1999)
- 100 Years of Headline News (1999)
- Building the Future. The Story of the Eastern Municipal Water District (2000)
- Old Orange County Courthouse; A Centennial History (2001)
- Borrego Beginnings. Early Days in the Borrego Valley, 1910-1960 (2001)
- “Out Among the Groves of Orange” A History of Orange Union High School, 1903-1953 (2003)
- Barnstorming the Desert. The Life of Randall Henderson, Founder of Desert Magazine and a Pioneer Pilot of the Desert Southwest (2004)
- Orange County Place Names A to Z (2006)
- Images of America: Orange (2008)
- On My Honor, A Century of Scouting in Orange County, California (2010)
- A Brief History of Orange, The Plaza City (2011)
- Orange County Chronicles (2013)
- Visiting Orange County’s Past (2014)
- A Call for Reform, The Southern California Indian Writings of Helen Hunt Jackson (with Valerie Sherer Mathes) (2015)
- Reservations, Removal, and Reform; The Mission Indian Agents of Southern California, 1878-1903 (with Valerie Sherer Mathes) (2018)
- The Portola Expedition In Orange County (with Eric Plunkett) (2019)
