= Pala Indian Reservation =

Native Luiseño and Cupeño Indians in Southern California

Coordinates: 33°21′34″N 117°02′49″W

Pala Band of Mission Indians
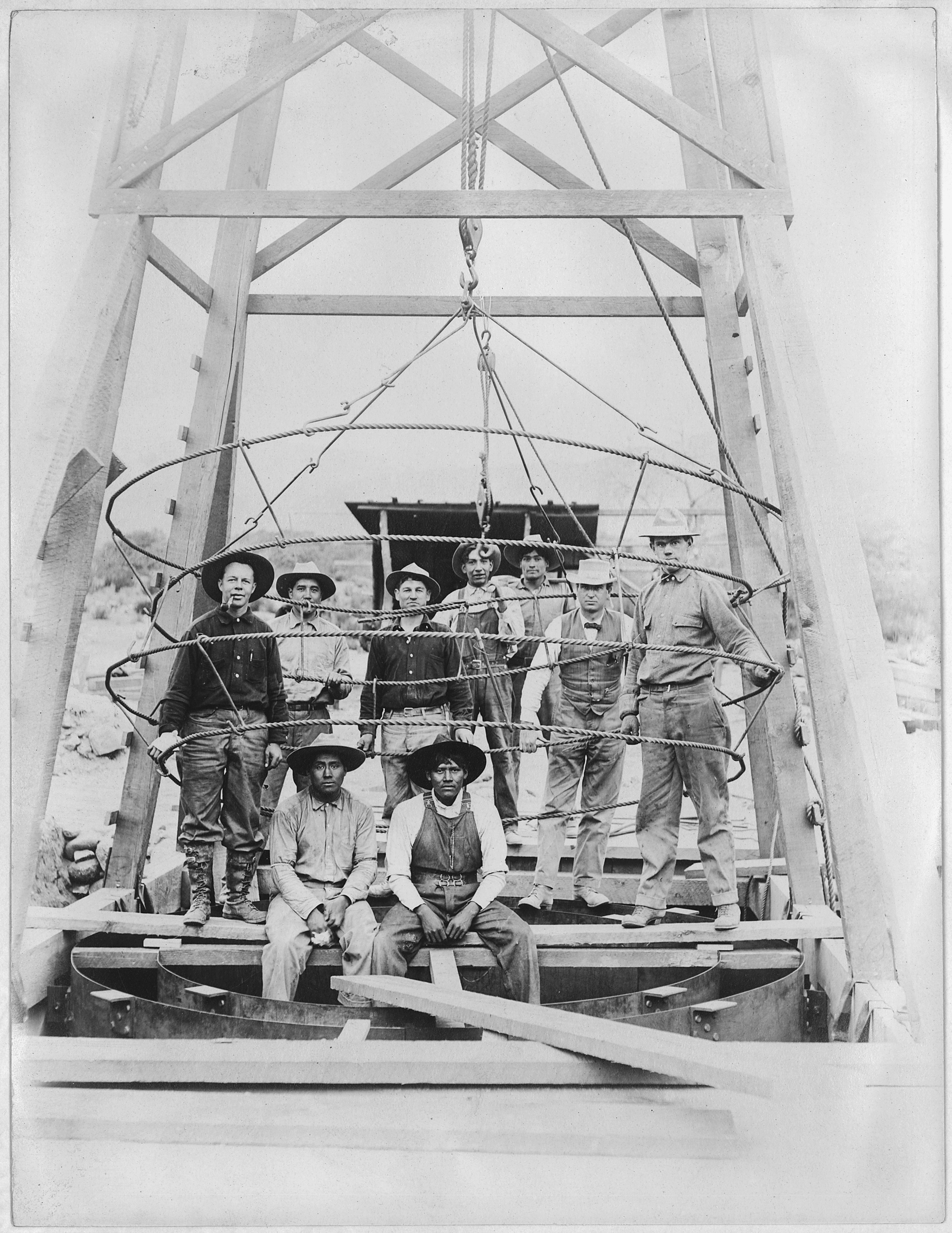
- Pala Reservation. Reinforcement of first joint of caisson - NARA

Total population
- 1,573 reservation population (2000 US Census)

Regions with significant populations
- United States (California)

Languages
- English, Luiseño, Cupeño

Related ethnic groups
- other Cupeño people and Luiseño people

The Pala Indian Reservation is the reservation of the Pala Band of Mission Indians, a federally recognized tribe of Indigenous Californians. The reservation is in the San Luis Rey River Valley in northern San Diego County, California, east of the community of Fallbrook.

The reservation has also historically been called the Mission Indian Reservation.

Pala Band citizens are Cupeño and Luiseño. These bands have shared territory since 1903. Five other federally recognized tribes are Luiseño and are located in southern California.

The Pala Reservation is the most populated reservation in San Diego County. Its area is 52.163 km^{2} (20.140 sq mi) and resident population in 1,573 persons, according to the 2000 census. About 44 percent of whom were of solely Native American heritage. Robert H. Smith is the Tribal Chairman.

== Politics ==
The Pala Band of Mission Indians is governed by a six-member Executive Committee. Committee members elected by the General Counsel, who is composed of voters of 18 and up. Every two years in November an election is held. The tribal committee is made up of a tribal chairman, vice chairman, secretary, treasurer, and two council members. The tribe follows a constitution created in 1994, which was approved by the Bureau of Indian Affairs in 2000 retroactive to 1997.

The seat of government of the reservation is in Pala, California.

== Reservation ==
Location of Pala Indian Reservation

The reservation occupies parts of four 7.5 minute topographic maps: Boucher Hill, Pala, Pechanga, and Vail Lake, California. The area consists of an area in and around Pala, California. The enrolled tribal members descend from two Indian groups: a band of the Luiseño tribe, and the Cupeño Indians, who were historically one of the smallest tribes in California. Their name for themselves was Kuupangaxwichem. The reservation also hosts a radio station, Pala Rez Radio KPRI 91.3 FM.

=== 2020 census ===
Pala Reservation, California – Racial and ethnic composition Note: the US Census treats Hispanic/Latino as an ethnic category. This table excludes Latinos from the racial categories and assigns them to a separate category. Hispanics/Latinos may be of any race.
Race / Ethnicity (NH = Non-Hispanic)	Pop 2000	Pop 2010	Pop 2020	% 2000	% 2010	% 2020
White alone (NH)	121	123	85	7.69%	9.35%	5.52%
Black or African American alone (NH)	4	11	3	0.25%	0.84%	0.19%
Native American or Alaska Native alone (NH)	621	548	758	39.48%	41.67%	49.19%
Asian alone (NH)	7	0	4	0.45%	0.00%	0.26%
Native Hawaiian or Pacific Islander alone (NH)	0	4	1	0.00%	0.30%	0.06%
Other race alone (NH)	2	1	3	0.13%	0.08%	0.19%
Mixed race or Multiracial (NH)	19	45	54	1.21%	3.42%	3.50%
Hispanic or Latino (any race)	799	583	633	50.79%	44.33%	41.08%
Total	1,573	1,315	1,541	100.00%	100.00%	100.00%

== History and culture ==
During the mission period of Spanish colonial times, Pala was the site of San Antonio de Pala Asistencia, an asistencia – an arm of the Catholic Mission San Luis Rey de Francia, downstream toward the coast. The grounds of the former asistencia include a historic cemetery.

The tribe is federally recognized. The Cupeño people were evicted in 1901 from their ancestral homeland, called Kupa, on what is now called Warner's Ranch east of Pala. This event is referred to by the tribe as the "Cupeño Trail of Tears." The Cupeño were removed to a tract of land in the Pala Valley adjacent to the Pala Luiseño reservation that already existed there in May 1903. That tract of land was purchased pursuant to the express direction of Congress for "such Mission Indians heretofore residing or belonging to the Rancho San Jose del Valle, or Warners Ranch, in San Diego County, California, and such other Mission Indians as may not be provided with suitable lands elsewhere, as the Secretary of the Interior may see fit to locate thereon." The tract of land had no form of infrastructure, so the Cupeño had to sleep in the open fields. In addition, their Chinigchinich religious ties to their previous land holdings were denied to them, which hindered their spirituality. They have not been able to regain their previous homeland, Kupa.

== Gaming and economic development ==
Traditionally a modest and sometimes poor tribe, since the late 20th century, the Pala Band has developed a large, successful casino and resort hotel: Pala Casino Resort and Spa. The tribe uses proceeds from the gaming and hospitality enterprises to fund social services and education for members, and infrastructure improvements to the reservation. The Pala branch also cultivates a 90-acre avocado grove on the southern part of the reservation. The grove provides jobs to over 40 individuals.

Outcomes of the Gaming Profits

- $1.5 million home loan program
- $300,000 scholarship fund for higher education
- Additional land for the Tribal cemetery
- Firefighter and paramedic service
- 24-hour on-site ambulance
- 24/7/365 non commercial FM station KPRI, known as "Rez Radio 91.3"

== Environmental department ==
The department monitors the pollution and cleanliness of the air, water, and land specific to the Pala reservation. The U.S. provided the reservation with a grant in 1999 that enabled the tribe to observe the pollution levels of the environment. The grant contributes to technology for the department, personnel training, and other necessities needed to manage the department. Some of the tasks that the department fulfills are computing the air quality index for the region, which describes the pollutants in the air, along with solutions and methods to combat the issue. Another is to ensure that the water meets the Federal Safe Drinking Water Act standards, in addition to the conservation of water in the reservation. In addition to environment conservation, they also work to preserve and maintain historical and cultural sites.

== Other Luiseño bands ==
Another major federally recognized tribe of related people, the Pauma Band of Luiseno Mission Indians resides to the southeast in the area traversed by State Route 76. A total of five other federally recognized tribes of Luiseño are located in southern California.

== See also ==
- Pechanga Band of Luiseno Mission Indians
- Mission San Antonio de Pala
- Rice v. Rehner
- Pala, California
- Roscinda Nolasquez
