= Maidu Regional Park =

Park in Roseville, California

Coordinates: 38.7351°N 121.2481°W

The Maidu Regional Park is located in Roseville, California. This 152-acre park has a small museum and historic site. The grounds also consist of the Maidu Community Center, the Maidu Branch Library, and Veterans Memorial Rose Garden. Other features include a four-diamond softball complex, a five-field soccer complex, a skate park, a full basketball court, picnic areas and play equipment, and a bicycle and pedestrian path through the wooded area of the park where multiple artifacts from the Maidu Native American tribe have been found.

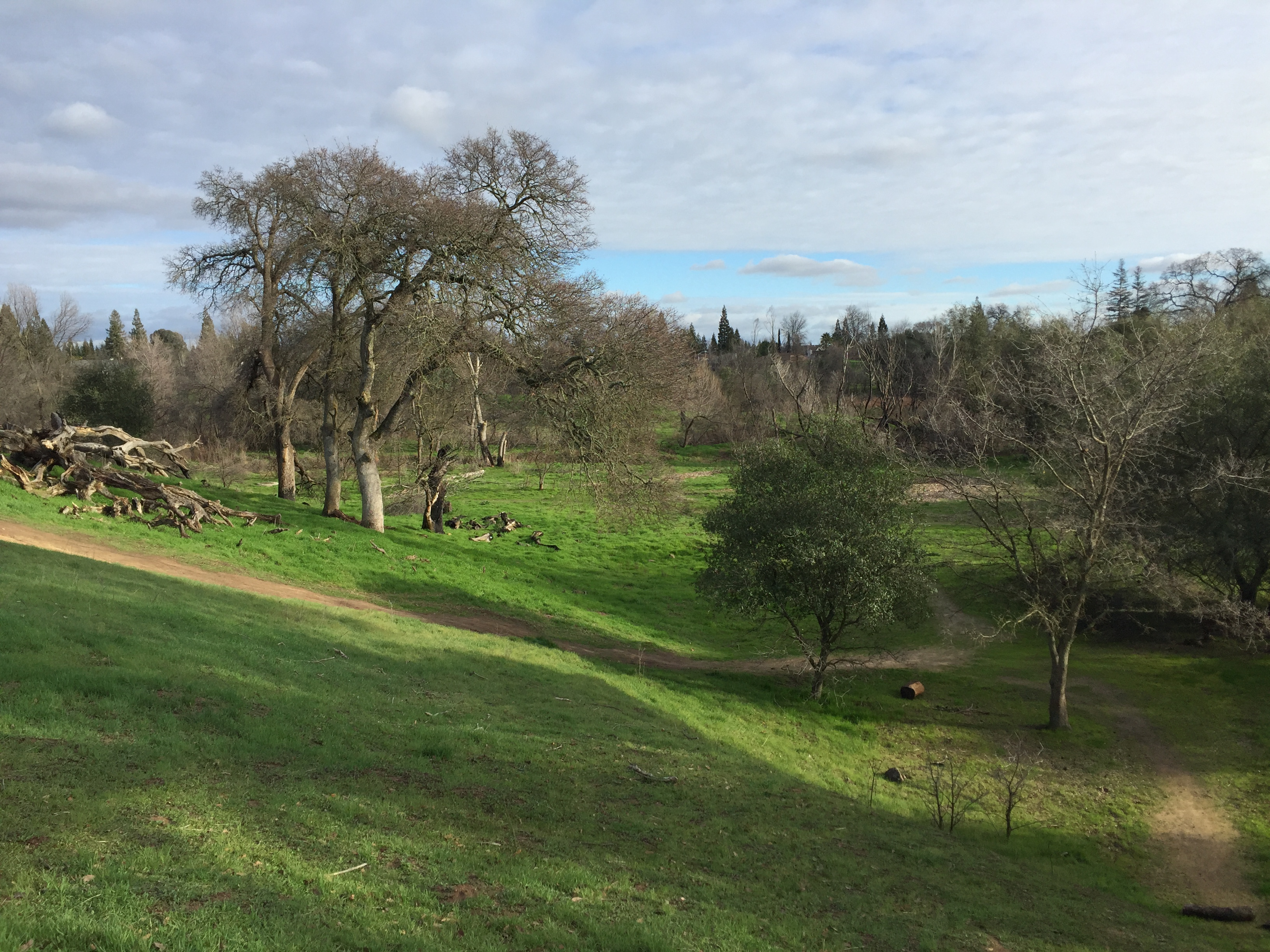
Maidu Regional Park
