= Pala, California =

Census-designated place in California, United States

Pala
- Census-designated place
- San Antonio de Pala
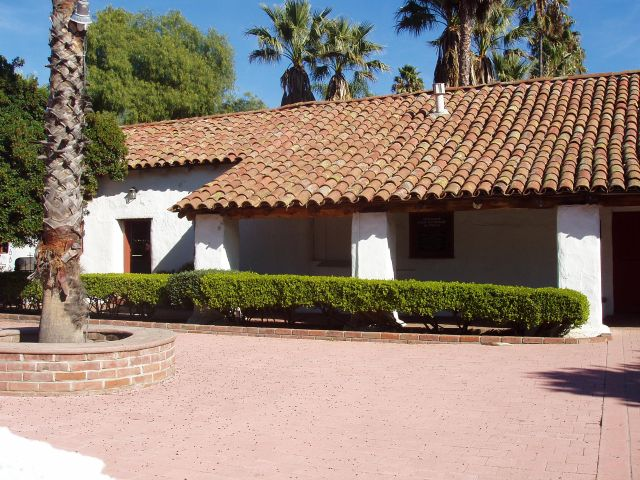
- San Antonio de Pala Asistencia

- Location in San Diego County, California

- Location within the state of California Pala (the United States)
- Coordinates: 33°21′55″N 117°4′36″W
- Country: United States
- State: California
- County: San Diego

Population (2020)
  - Total: 1,490
- Time zone: UTC-8 (Pacific (PST))
  - Summer (DST): UTC-7 (PDT)
- ZIP codes: 92059
- Area codes: 442/760

Pala is a small, mostly Native American community and census-designated place located within the Pala Indian Reservation in San Diego County, California. As of the 2020 census, Pala had a population of 1,490. For centuries it was a traditional gathering place of Native peoples. The Mission San Antonio de Pala or Pala Mission was established in Pala by early 19th century as an asistencia or sub-mission.

The community is north of Escondido in the San Diego-Carlsbad metro area. In the National Geographic Names database, it is officially catalogued as feature number 1661174. The community is in ZIP Code 92059, and inside area code 760.

The community's name may be derived from the Native American Cupeño or Luiseño language term pale, meaning "water." Another possible origin of the name is the Spanish word pala, which means "shovel."

The community is in the Pacific time zone. Pala is at an altitude of 404 feet, located at 33°21′55″N 117°04′36″W (latitude 33.365N, longitude 117.075W).

== Mineral resources ==
After United States annexation of California following its victory in the Mexican–American War, Pala became known for its mineral resources, including gold and tourmaline. Numerous gem mines were established in 1890s, of which more than twenty are listed in the Mindat database. Gem mines in the Pala District still produce tourmaline, with the pink variety as the regional specialty.

China's Empress Dowager Cixi (1860–1908) was said to have valued the pink tourmaline of Pala to be used for carving buttons and other fashion accessories which fueled a boom for pink tourmaline lasting from about 1901–1911. Local Pala area miner and gem cutter Fred Rynerson noted the best years for San Diego Tourmaline Mining Company were from 1903 to 1910, and the China trade customers were only interested in pink tourmaline cabochon material suitable for shaping vice gem quality for faceting.

The first discovery of Morganite has been attributed to both Pala and as Madagascar. Morganite also termed rose beryl was named by Dr. George F. Kunz at a meeting in December 1910 at the New York Academy of Sciences and put on display at American Museum of Natural History. Dr. Kunz appeared to be in possession of samples from both Madagascar and California at time of naming with the sample displayed coming from Madagascar. In contemporary accounts Dr. Kunz states Morganite was “principally found off Madagascar” implying that in 1910 it was known to exist in more than one place.

In 1902 the purple-colored gemstone kunzite discovered near Pala by Dr. George F. Kunz and by 1903 was named in his honor while being displayed at Tiffany and Co. and American Museum of Natural History, New York. Dr. Kunz's 1932 obituary describes him as “Americas greatest expert on gems”

The 1915 San Diego Panama–California Exposition featured a reproduction of the Pala Chief Mine termed “The Gem Mine”. In order to match the original mine, there were timbers and red pay streak mud brought from Pala Mountain to San Diego's Balboa Park where it was used in a display of tunnels with replicated gem pockets of tourmaline, beryl, and kunzite as found at the Pala Chief mine.

== Demographics ==
Historical population
Census	Pop.	Note	%±
2020	1,490		—
U.S. Decennial Census; 2010 2020

Pala first appeared as a census designated place in the 2020 U.S. census.

=== 2020 census ===
As of the 2020 census, Pala had a population of 1,490. The median age was 30.3 years. 36.2% of residents were under the age of 18 and 9.3% of residents were 65 years of age or older. For every 100 females there were 90.3 males, and for every 100 females age 18 and over there were 83.4 males age 18 and over.

0.0% of residents lived in urban areas, while 100.0% lived in rural areas.

There were 428 households in Pala, of which 48.6% had children under the age of 18 living in them. Of all households, 33.2% were married-couple households, 19.4% were households with a male householder and no spouse or partner present, and 33.4% were households with a female householder and no spouse or partner present. About 19.4% of all households were made up of individuals and 6.5% had someone living alone who was 65 years of age or older.

There were 458 housing units, of which 6.6% were vacant. The homeowner vacancy rate was 0.3% and the rental vacancy rate was 1.6%.

Pala CDP, California – Racial and ethnic composition Note: the US Census treats Hispanic/Latino as an ethnic category. This table excludes Latinos from the racial categories and assigns them to a separate category. Hispanics/Latinos may be of any race.
Race / Ethnicity (NH = Non-Hispanic)	Pop 2020	% 2020
White alone (NH)	68	4.56%
Black or African American alone (NH)	3	0.20%
Native American or Alaska Native alone (NH)	756	50.74%
Asian alone (NH)	4	0.27%
Native Hawaiian or Pacific Islander alone (NH)	1	0.07%
Other race alone (NH)	3	0.20%
Mixed race or Multiracial (NH)	53	3.56%
Hispanic or Latino (any race)	602	40.40%
Total	1,490	100.00%

== Attractions ==
- Mission San Antonio De Pala
- Pala Casino Spa and Resort
- Fox Raceway
- Wilderness Gardens County Preserve
- Pala Shooting Range
- Oceanview Mine

== See also ==
- Mission San Antonio de Pala
- Pala Indian Reservation
