= California State Indian Museum =

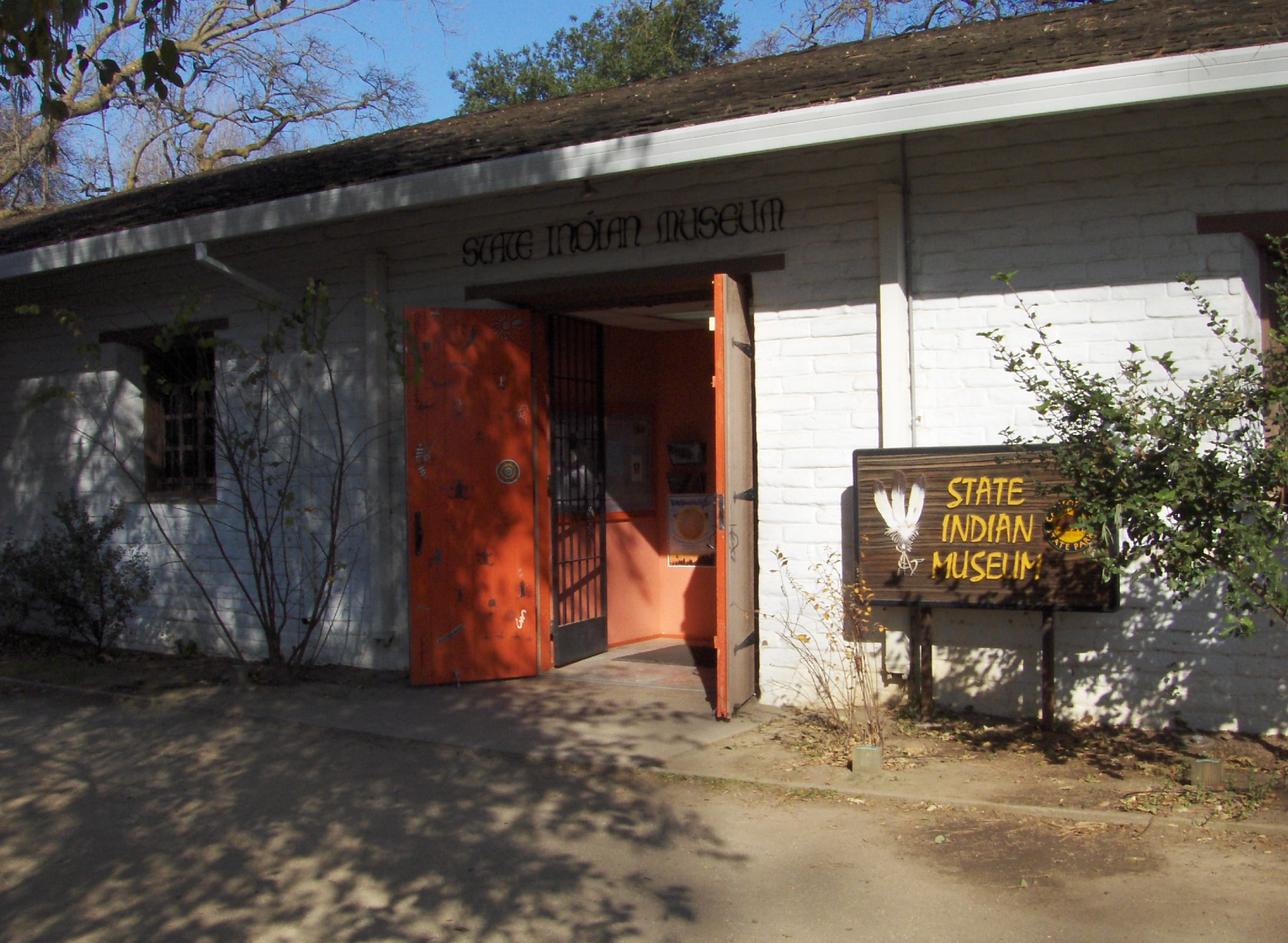
- California State Indian Museum entrance

- Location in Sacramento
- 38°34′22″N 121°28′17″W
- Location: 2618 K Street, Sacramento, California, U.S.

History
- Built: June 23, 1914

Site notes
- Governing body: California Department of Parks and Recreation

California Historical Landmark
- Designated: August 17, 1990
- Reference no.: 991

The California State Indian Museum is a museum in the state park system of California, United States, interpreting the diverse cultures of the Indigenous peoples of California. It is located in Midtown Sacramento at 2618 K Street. The museum exhibits traditional items illustrating the varying cultures of the state's first inhabitants. The Native population of California, one of the largest and most diverse in the Western hemisphere, was made up of over 150 distinct tribal groups who spoke at least 64 different languages. Prior to the arrival of the first European explorers, the native population is estimated to have been in excess of 500,000 people. The museum, besides hosting artifacts and information, also serves as a cultural meeting point. It has been credited with reinforcing the idea that California's Native population is not some distant memory, but a very contemporary presence in Sacramento.

== About ==
The State Indian Museum, opened in 1940, is located at 2618 K Street Sacramento, near the intersection of 26th and K Streets. It is next to Sutter's Fort. Current exhibits depict three major themes of California Indian life: Nature, Spirit, and Family. Native peoples lived prosperously for thousands of years in what is now California. All of the exhibits and photographs on display in the museum are presented with respect for those who went before us on this land and continue to live in California communities today.

California Indian cultural items in the museum include traditional baskets (along with some of the smallest in the world), a redwood dugout canoe, ceremonial regalia, beadwork, and hunting and fishing tools—some of which are more than twenty-four hundred years old. There is also an exhibit depicting the life of Ishi, reputedly the last survivor of the Yahi tribe, illustrating how Native culture was powerfully impacted and forever changed when outsiders arrived.

Many Native people have donated photographs of family and friends for viewing in the museum. There is also a wall of photographs devoted to honoring California Elders, and a hands-on area where visitors have the opportunity to utilize Indian tools like the pump drill, used for making holes in shell beads, and the mortar & pestle, used for grinding acorns.

== History of the museum ==
From 1927 to 1939, cultural items owned by Benjamin Welcome Hathaway were housed in the State Library & Courts building and later the State Capitol. The State Indian Museum was officially dedicated in 1940 by the Native Daughters of the Golden West. From 1951 to 1956, themed exhibits were developed so that the museum would tell a story rather than just be a display area. In the 1960s, more regional tribes began to influence exhibits while more enhanced curatorial care techniques were put into practice. The museum claimed a marked increase of association with local Native tribes in the 1970s with a museum store opening in 1972 and the first Gathering of Honored Elders taking place in 1978. From 1984 to 1985 the museum closed for renovations. From 2013 to 2014 the museum saw further improvements with the addition of text panels and a gallery/meeting room being repurposed as a renamed Basket Gallery dedicated to the Basket weavers of California.

== A new museum ==
On May 11, 2018, Governor Jerry Brown of California allocated $100 million in state funding for the construction of the California Indian Heritage Center in West Sacramento, California. This center would replace the State Indian Museum. Land was transferred in June 2019 and the project was delayed in May 2020 as funds were shifted to help manage the COVID-19 pandemic. In April 2022, the California State Parks and Recreation department announced that the Fentress Architects firm would design and build the center. The proposed buildout, as of April 2022, is 2028 with a completion date of 2032.

== See also ==
- List of California state parks
- Gorman Museum of Native American Art
