= Cupeño language =

Extinct Uto-Aztecan language of California

Cupeño
- Kupangaxwicham Peʼme̱melki
- Native to: United States
- Region: Southern California
- Ethnicity: Cupeño
- Extinct: February 4, 1987, with the death of Roscinda Nolásquez
- Revival
- Language family: Uto-Aztecan: Northern Uto-Aztecan; Takic; Cupan; Cahuilla–Cupeño; Cupeño
- Writing system: Latin

Language codes
- ISO 639-3: cup
- Glottolog: cupe1243
- ELP: Cupeño
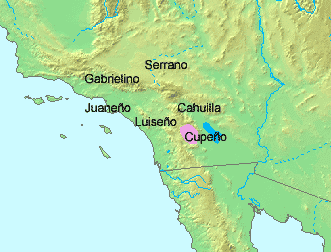

- Cupeño is classified as Extinct by the UNESCO Atlas of the World's Languages in Danger.

Cupeño, or Páʼanexily, is an Uto-Aztecan language that was spoken by the Cupeño people of southern California, United States. Roscinda Nolásquez was the last native speaker of Cupeño. The Cupeño people now speak English. The native name Kupangaxwicham means 'people from the sleeping place', referring to their traditional homeland, prior to 1902, of Ktipa (at the base of Warner's Hot Springs). A smaller village was located to the south of Ktipa, named Wildkalpa.

Throughout the 1890s, there was debate over whether the Cupeño people should be allowed to continue living on traditional Cupeño territory. After many years of public protests, the California Supreme Court decided to relocate the Cupeño people to the Pala Reservation.

Cupeño shows linguistic influence from both the languages that preceded it and the Yuman-speaking Ipai, who share their southern border.

== Geographic distribution ==
The language was originally spoken in Cupa, Wilaqalpa, and Paluqla, located in San Diego County, California, and later around the Pala Indian Reservation.

== Phonology ==
=== Vowels ===
	Front	Central	Back
High	i iː		u uː
Mid	ɛ ɛː	ə əː	o oː
Low		a aː	

/ɛ/ and /o/ primarily occur in Spanish loanwords but also serve as allophones of /ə/ in native Cupeño words.

/i/ can be realized as [ɪ] in closed syllables and as [e] in some open syllables.

/u/ may reduce to a schwa in unstressed syllables.

/ə/ also appears as [ɨː] when long and stressed, [o] after labials and [q], and as [ɛ] before [w].

/a/ is also realized as [ɑ] before uvulars.

=== Consonants ===
		Bilabial	Coronal		Palatal	Velar		Uvular	Glottal
		Bilabial	laminal	apical	Palatal	plain	labial.	Uvular	Glottal
Nasal		m	n		ɲ	ŋ			
Plosive		p	t		(t)ʃ (Note: /tʃ/ is realized as [ʃ] in syllable codas.)	k	kʷ (Note: /kʷ/ is realized as [qʷ] before unstressed /a/ or /e/.)	q	ʔ
Fricative	voiceless		s	ʂ	(t)ʃ	x ~ χ (Note: [x] and [χ] appear to be in free variation.)	xʷ		h
Fricative	voiced	β	ð (Note: /ð/, and /ɾ/ appear only in Spanish loanwords.)			ɣ			
Approximant					j		w		
Lateral			l		ʎ				
Trill				ɾ					

== Morphology ==
Cupeño is an agglutinative language, where words use suffix complexes for a variety of purposes with several morphemes strung together. It is dominantly head-final, with a mostly strict word order (SOV) for some constituents, such as genitive-noun constructions. However, in certain contexts, there is flexibility in the word order, allowing verbs to be shifted to the initial part of a sentence or arguments to follow verbs.

=== Nouns ===
Nouns, as well as demonstratives, determiners, quantifiers, and adjectives, in Cupeño are marked for case and number and agree with each other in complex nominal constructions.

=== Verbs ===
Cupeño inflects its verbs for transitivity, tense, aspect, mood, person, number, and evidentiality.

Evidentiality in Cupeño is expressed with clitics, typically appearing near the beginning of the sentence:

=kuʼut 'reportative' (mu=kuʼut 'and it is said that...') =am 'mirative' =$he 'dubitative'

There are two inflected moods, realis =pe and irrealis =eʼp.

==== Tense-Aspect system ====
Future simple verbs remain unmarked. Past simple verbs include past-tense pronouns, while past imperfect verbs add the imperfect modifier as shown below.

	Present	Imperfect	Fut. Imp	Customary
Singular	-qa	-qal	-nash	-ne
Plural	-we	-wen	-wene	-wene

=== Pronouns ===
The pronominals in Cupeño manifest in various forms and structures. The following are only attached to past-tense verbs.

	Singular	Plural
1st person	ne	chem-
2nd person	e-	em-
3rd person	pe-	pem-

== Lexicon ==
English words and Cupeño counterparts
English	Cupeño
one	suplawut
two	wiʼ
three	pa
four	wichu
five	numaqananax
man	naxanis
woman	muwikut
sun	tamyut
moon	munil
water	pal

== See also ==
- Survey of California and Other Indian Languages
