= Bugbee =

Bugbee is a surname. Notable people with the name include:

- Bruce Bugbee, American scientist
- Charles Bugbee (1887–1959), British Olympic water polo player
- Emma Bugbee (1888–1981), American suffragist and journalist
- Francis Bugbee (1794–1877), American lawyer, judge and politician
- Harold Dow Bugbee (1900–63), American Western artist, illustrator and painter
- Henry Bugbee (1915–1999), American philosopher and professor
- Marion L. Bugbee (1871–1950), American physician
- Maurice Bugbee (1914–1975), American football and basketball coach
- Newton A.K. Bugbee (1876–1965), American businessman and Republican Party politician
- Percy I. Bugbee, American academic administrator and mathematics professor
- Richard Lee Bugbee (1948–2023), Native American ethnobotany instructor
- Shane Bugbee (born 1968), Underground artist, publisher, multi-media communicator, filmmaker and event promoter
