= Temecula massacre =

Massacre of Luiseno Natives perpetrated by Cahuillas and Californios

- Part of the Conquest of California during the Mexican–American War
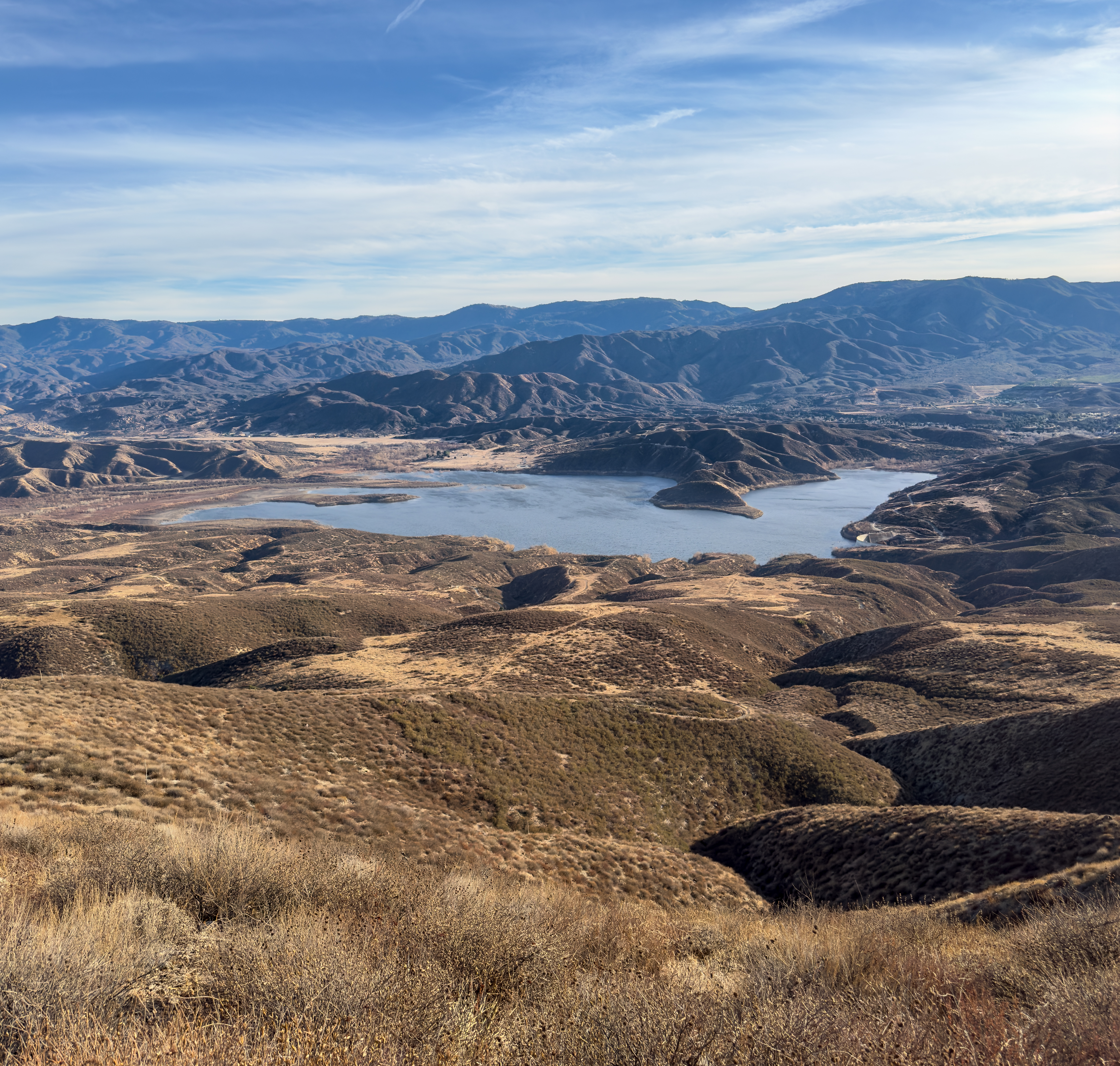
- Vail Lake, the flooded site of the massacre
Date	December 1846
Location	Rancho Pauba, Alta California, Mexico (near modern-day Temecula, CA, U.S.) 33.2928°N 116.5817°W
Result	Cahuilla & Mexican victory

Belligerents
Luiseño Natives	Mexican Californios & Cahuilla Natives

Commanders and leaders
Chief Manuelito Cota	Chief Juan Antonio; José del Carmen Lugo

Strength
50-100 Luiseño warriors	80 Californios soldiers and Cahuilla warriors

Casualties and losses
33-40 Luiseño Natives, with 20+ prisoners killed	Unknown

The Temecula Massacre, also called the Battle of Temecula, took place in December 1846 near the Vail Lake east of present-day Temecula, California, United States. It was part of a series of related events in the Mexican–American War. A combined force of Californio militia and Cahuilla warriors attacked and killed an estimated 33 to 40 Luiseño people. The Mexican authorities in California took military action in retaliation for the Indians' killing of 11 Californio lancers, in what was called the Pauma massacre.

== Background ==
In a conflict that was part of the Mexican–American War, in the Battle of San Pasqual on December 6 and 7, 1846, Andrés Pico led a force of Californios against a small detachment of the California Battalion representing the United States, led by Stephen W. Kearny. Soon after, a small group of the Californio lancers stole horses from the Pauma band for the war. The Luiseño Indians murdered the eleven Californios from Pico's forces in retaliation, in what became known as the Pauma massacre. When the Mexican General José María Flores in Los Angeles learned about this challenge to Mexican authority, he sent José del Carmen Lugo from San Bernardino with a force of men to capture and execute the tribal leaders responsible.

== Events ==
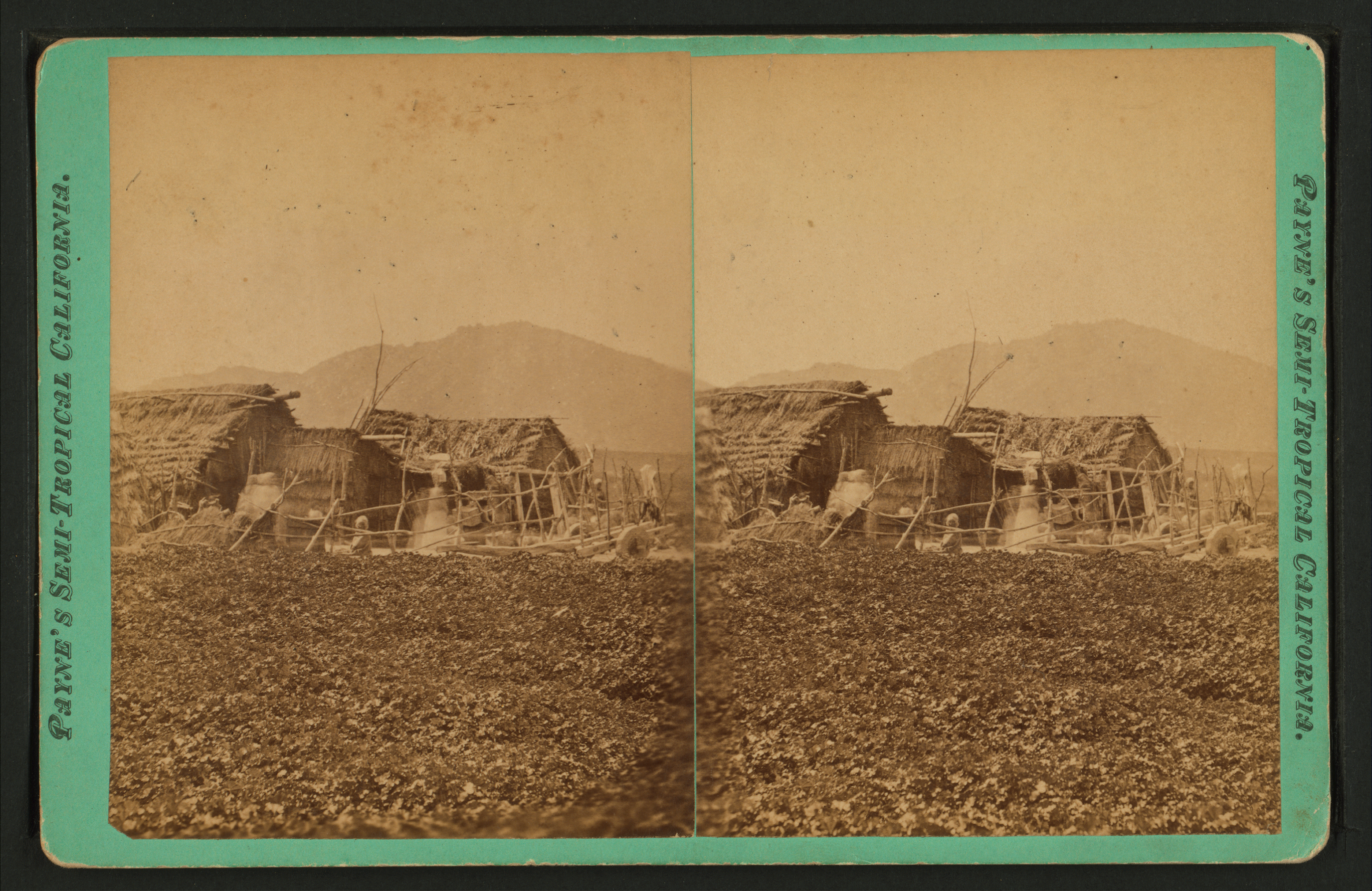
Temecula Indian Huts c. 1880s

While en route to the Temecula Valley, Lugo encountered Chief Juan Antonio, leader of a group of Cahuilla Indians, who joined his forces. The two groups set up camp along the Temecula Creek. Lugo was to wait for reinforcements from Los Angeles. Learning that José Ramón Carrillo and a group of men were at the Mission San Luis Rey de Francia, Lugo requested him to provide assistance. Carrillo and his men joined Lugo and Chief Antonio. Word reached the Temecula village that Californios from Los Angeles were headed to the valley. The Luiseño went east into the canyon, and hid in huts.

Lugo sent a few men to find the Luiseño warriors. The men reported back that the Luiseños were hiding. Lugo knew if his men went into the canyon, they would be trapped, so he decided to draw the Luiseño out of hiding and into his own trap. Just west of the canyon was a small meadow with rolling hills on either side. The Cahuilla took position on one hill, and Lugo set his men on the other. Carrillo and his men went into the canyon, where they feigned fatigue. Young Indian warriors thought they saw an opportunity to take the Californios. The chiefs tried to calm them, but the warriors attacked the Californios.

Carrillo and his men fled from the canyon into the meadow, pulling the warriors in pursuit. Once the war party was in the meadow, the Cahuilla and Lugo's men attacked the Luisenos, and Carrillo's men turned and attacked as well. Many warriors were killed; others surrendered. A few warriors escaped and headed toward Aguanga.

Lugo turned over the captives to the Cahuilla, their traditional enemy. Lugo and a few men then pursued the escaped Indians. When Lugo returned, Chief Antonio had already killed all the prisoners. The Californios and the Cahuilla regrouped at their campsite. Another group of soldiers, led by Diego Sepúlveda, joined Lugo at the campsite. Sepúlveda's men had been delayed in joining Lugo.

During the aftermath of the massacre, the Mormon Battalion passed through Temecula. The arrival of the Mormons reportedly allowed the Luiseño people to recover the remains and take them to the Luiseño cemetery to be properly buried. The Mormons also stood guard to prevent further bloodshed and provide security while the Luiseño people gathered their dead into a common grave.

== See also ==
- List of massacres in California
- Outline of the California genocide
- California genocide
