= Patricia A. Dixon =

American Luiseño academic (born 1948)

Chair of the Pauma Band of Luiseno Mission Indians

Chair of the Palomar College Department of American Indian Studies
- Succeeded by: Seth San Juan

Personal details
- Born: 1948 (age 77–78)
- Parent: Lorena Lucille Majel Dixon (mother)
- Education: University of Dayton; San Diego College for Women
- Occupation: Academic; politician

Academic work
- Discipline: Native American studies
- Institutions: Palomar College

Patricia Anne Dixon (born 1948) is an American Luiseño academic and politician. She has spent decades as a professor at Palomar College, where she served as chair of the Department of American Indian Studies, and she has served as chair of the Pauma Band of Luiseno Mission Indians.

== Biography ==
Dixon was born in 1948, the daughter of Luiseño tribal chair Lorena Lucille Majel Dixon. After attending the San Antonio de Pala Asistencia's parish school, she attended the Academy of the Little Flower in Oceanside after her parents protested against a public school's racist attempts to force her to enroll in home economics courses. After studying at the University of Dayton, She then moved on to San Diego College for Women, where she got her BA and MA (1971) degrees in American History and was one of their first Native American graduates; she recalled being the only enrolled Native American student in both schools. For her graduate studies, she studied at the University of California, Riverside, St. Thomas Seminary, and University of San Francisco.

In the 1970s, she moved to Palomar College, where she taught Native American history and was later promoted to associate professor. She also helped expand their scope of American Indian studies education from one small program to a separate department, as well as those at California State University San Marcos (Cal State San Marcos) and University of San Diego (USD). She was also chair of Palomar's aforementioned Department of American Indian Studies, before being replaced by Seth San Juan. In addition to Palomar, she has also taught at San Diego State University as a lecturer. She has served in Sherman Indian High School's board and in Cal State San Marcos' council, chairing the former at one point.

In October 2012, she was given the USD School of Leadership and Education Services Remarkable Leader in Education award.

Dixon is a member of the Pauma Band of Luiseno Mission Indians and would commute to Palomar from the Pauma and Yuima Reservation. She has also served at least two terms as chair of the tribe, including in 1983. In 2000, she made a draft on a still-unpublished children's book on the Luiseño. In 2022, she was among the tribespeople who gave the near-Earth asteroid 594913 ꞌAylóꞌchaxnim its Luiseño-language IAU-approved name.

She is a cousin of Pauma Band of Luiseno Mission Indians tribal chairman Temet Aguilar.

== See also ==
- List of Native American politicians
- Native American women in politics
