= Juan Antonio (Cahuilla) =

Major chief of the Cahuilla people (1840s – 1863)

- Cooswootna, Yampoochee (He Gets Mad Quickly)

Chief of the Mountain Band of the Cahuilla leader

Personal details
- Born: c. 1783 Near Mt. San Jacinto
- Died: 1863 (aged 80) Saahatpa
- Resting place: Saahatpa, California

Juan Antonio (c. 1783–1863), Cahuilla name: Cooswootna, Yampoochee, (He Gets Mad Quickly), was a major chief of the Mountain Band of the Cahuilla from the 1840s to 1863.

== Biography ==
Juan Antonio was born somewhere in the vicinity of Mt. San Jacinto in 1783. In 1840, the Ute leader Walkara led a great raid through the Cajon Pass into Southern California to capture a large number of horses from the Mexican ranchos. In some of these raids, his raiders clashed with Juan Antonio and the Cahuilla Mountain Band. In 1842, Juan Antonio greeted the explorer Daniel Sexton and gave him access to explore the area near the San Gorgonio Pass.

Following Walkara's raid, Jose Carmen del Lugo invited New Mexican colonists to settle in Politana to in exchange for defending his Rancho San Bernardino and its herds of horses and cattle from raids by bandits and Native American raiders. Following a dispute with the Lugo's the New Mexicans moved south to build the settlements of Agua Mansa and La Placita de Trujillo on the Rancho Jurupa. Chief Juan Antonio was then invited to move a group of his Cahuilla Mountain Band to Politana in their place.

During the Mexican–American War, Chief Juan Antonio led his warriors to join Californios led by Jose Carmen del Lugo in attacking their traditional enemy, the Luiseño. Lugo led this action in retaliation for the Pauma Massacre, in which the Luiseno had killed 11 Californios. The combined forces staged an ambush and killed 33–40 of the Luiseno warriors, an event that became known as the Temecula Massacre of 1847.

Juan Antonio also lent support to a U.S. Army expedition led by Lieutenant Edward Fitzgerald Beale, defending the party against attacks by Walkara and his band of Ute warriors. For his help Beale awarded him a pair of military epaulets, which he wore thereafter.

In the summer of 1851, Juan Antonio and a group of his fellow tribesmen pursued and destroyed the outlaw Irving Gang in San Timoteo Canyon. This band of ruffians had stolen and robbed in the San Bernardino Valley including at the Rancho San Bernardino, near Juan Antonio's village of Politana. Acting on the orders of the Jose Carmen del Lugo, Justice of the Peace and proprietor of the rancho, whose house the brigands were looting at the time, the Cahuilla pursued them into the canyon and in a running fight chased them into a box canyon, surrounded and killed eleven of them with arrows. Working on the ranchos and hunting down native raiders and bandits was a role that Juan Antonio's people had played in the San Bernardino region under the Mexican authorities. Under American rule, they believed themselves duly authorized by the Justice of the Peace to carry out their actions as before.

However, the newly arrived American settlers in Southern California resented the killing of white men by Indians and took it to be the beginning of an Indian uprising. A company of militia from San Diego was sent against them. The Cahuilla fled to the mountains and discovering the truth of the matter, the leader of the militia, Major General Joshua H. Bean, restrained the militia from attacking the Cahuilla with difficulty, preventing a war. Judge Benjamin Ignatius Hayes held a hearing and subsequently found their actions had legal justification. However the resentment of local Americans at the killing of fellow Americans led Juan Antonio to move his people away from white settlements in the valley to the mountains.

Closely following the outcome of the Irving Gang incident, in late 1851, Juan Antonio, his warriors and their families, moved eastward from Politana, toward the San Gorgonio Pass and settled in a valley which branched off to the northeast from San Timoteo Canyon, at a village named Saahatpa. In November 1851, the Garra Revolt occurred, wherein the Cupeño leader Antonio Garra attempted to bring Juan Antonio into his revolt of native people in Southern California. Juan Antonio, friendly to the Californios and Americans, was instrumental in capturing Antonio Garra and turning him over to authorities helping to end that revolt.

Juan Antonio and his people remained in Saahatpa until he and many of his people died in the smallpox epidemic that struck Southern California in 1862–1863. It reduced the once numerous Cahuilla to a minority of the population in the region. Juan Antonio was buried at Saahatpa. His body was discovered there in a 1956 archeological expedition, identified by his epaulets and reburied with military honors.

== See also ==
- Cahuilla people
- San Timoteo Canyon
- Cabazon
