= Bonita Wa Wa Calachaw Nuñez =

Native American artist

- Nuñez, c. 1920
- Born: December 25, 1888; Valley Center
- Died: May 12, 1972 (age 83); New York City
- Known for: Painting
- Spouse: Manuel Carmonia-Nuñez

Bonita Wa Wa Calachaw Nuñez (December 25, 1888 — May 12, 1972), also known as Wa Wa Chaw, Princess Wa Wa Chaw, and Wawa Calac Chaw or "Keep From the Water," was a Native American artist, activist, and writer. She was active in the Pan-Indian Movement in the early 1900s and was close friends with Apache scholar Carlos Montezuma. Nuñez donated 20 of her paintings to the National Museum of the American Indian before her death, where they're still held today. After her death, Stan Steiner compiled her writings and published the book Spirit Woman: The Diaries and Paintings of Bonita Wa Wa Calachaw Nuñez.

== Early life and education ==
Nuñez was born on December 25, 1888, in the Southern California desert, near the town of Valley Center. She was most likely from the Rincon Band of the Luiseño tribe, although she was never able to confirm this. She was adopted by an unmarried, wealthy, Irish American woman named Mary Duggan, and she was raised by Mary and her brother, the prominent New York physician, Cornelius Duggan.

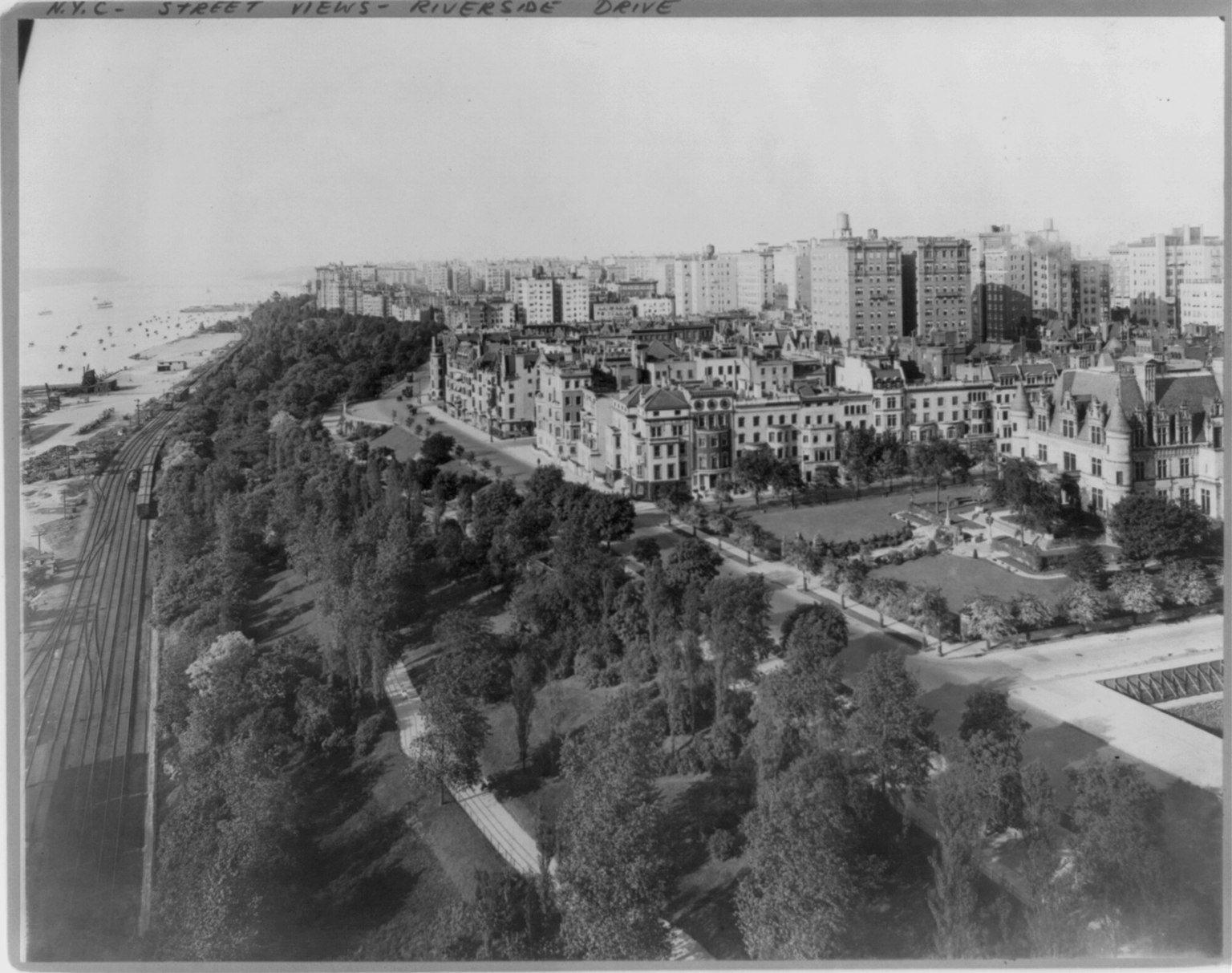
A photograph of Riverside Drive, New York taken in 1916.

Nuñez was raised in the wealthy and exclusive Riverside Drive neighborhood in New York City. There, she was often dressed up in "Indian dress" of buckskins and beads, and then shown off to her adoptive parent's important friends, who included Sir Arthur Conan Doyle, Carrie Chapman Catt, and Sir Oliver Lodge.

She had a sheltered childhood and was brought up isolated and lonely. Mary Duggan guarded her closely and attempted to insulate her from shocks, as she saw Nuñez as having "nervous susceptibility." Perhaps because of this, Nuñez never attended school, and she was instead educated by her parents and private teachers. She is often described as a child prodigy, and her adoptive parents nurtured and encouraged her artistic talents. Indeed, much of her early artistic training was gained by creating medical illustrations of Dr. Duggan's specimens. Her illustrations of cancerous bones, anatomical drawings, and radium experiments contributed to Duggan's research, and he was deeply impressed with her ability to understand complex aspects of cellular structures. Nuñez briefly studied art with Albert Pinkham Ryder.

When Nuñez was older, Mary Duggan attempted to get her into Barnard College, but she was refused admittance due to her race. Nuñez later wrote about this rejection stating, "I have not forgotten I was denied the Right [sic] of a college education."

== Marriage ==
Nuñez married Manuel Carmonia-Nuñez, a Puerto Rican businessman and labor organizer for the Cigar Workers' Union in New York City. This marriage was approved of by Mary, although, in the book Women Imagine Change, it states that Nuñez wrote about her husband with varying emotions, "from tenderness to passion to ambivalence." Nuñez wrote that she was "more interested in Reading than Love [sic]". During their marriage, Nuñez felt that she was stuck between her adoptive parents and her husband, and that they each were attempting to pull her in different directions. Nuñez and Carmonia-Nuñez had one child together. But their daughter, Tee Tee Chaw, died at the age of three. The marriage didn't last very long, and they eventually separated.

== Activism ==
Mary Duggan was a staunch activist and feminist who was particularly involved in uplifting the rights of Native Americans, and she included Nuñez in her activism from a young age. Indeed, when Nuñez was eight or ten years old, using a statement that was prewritten by her adoptive mother, she addressed a Convention on Women's Rights on the topic of "the suffering of Indian women." In 1898, when Nuñez was ten years old, she also attended one of the first meetings of what would one day become the Indian revival movement of the twentieth century.

As an adult, and beginning around World War I, Nuñez became active in the Pan-Indian Movement and fought for the rights of Native Americans to join the armed forces. This fight led to her close friendship with the Apache scholar Carlos Montezuma. After this, she fought tirelessly for the rights of Native Americans. She often received letters from Native Americans from all over the country, and she would respond with letters of her own as well as money from her welfare checks to help them.

== Career ==
Beginning at a young age, Nuñez would create medical illustrations for Dr. Cornelius Duggan, and as an adult she was able to make money from this work. Indeed, some of the best medical journals of her time sought out her illustrations, and she was in some demand. Despite this, and due to Mary Duggan's overprotectiveness and her sheltered childhood, Nuñez was dependent on her adoptive parents even in her thirties. After Mary's death, Nuñez became destitute, and in order to survive, she began selling an "Indian Liniment" made of "Secret Herbs" on the streets of New York City. In the 1920s she began selling her oil paintings on Greenwich Village sidewalks and she quickly became well known in the Greenwich Village outdoor art shows.

== Art ==
Nuñez's work is still relatively unknown, and can only be found in a few places including, the National Museum of the American Indian. Her medium of choice was oil paint on canvas, and she often focused on portraits of important people of her time, or else social problems that deeply concerned her. She used many earthy colors in her paintings; red, yellow, brown, black, and white were the dominant colors found in her work. Kathleen Ash-Milby describes her art as being "Dark and thickly textured, [and] the majority were portraits of people with thick limbs and features." And in the book The Arts of the North American Indian, it's said that her "art reveals a hauntingly dark vision of beings" and "such deeply primal and emotionally forceful images are relatively rare in any art tradition." Many of her paintings portray group or family scenes where the individuals are embracing each other.

Nuñez was inspired by the work of Käthe Kollwitz, Edvard Munch, and Emil Nolde.

== Later life and death ==
In an attempt to learn more about her birth mother and her tribe, Nuñez traveled to California and lived with the Luiseño tribe at some point in her adulthood. She also spent time living with various urban Native American communities in Chicago, Philadelphia, and New York. In her later life, Nuñez became something of a recluse, and she lived alone in an East Harlem apartment. She did, however, teach local children how to paint.

Nuñez died in New York City on May 12, 1972, at the age of 83. Her cause of death is not discussed in writings about her work and life, but author Stan Steiner states that "One Spring day she decided that she would die. And two weeks later she was dead." In preparation for her death she sent 20 of her favorite paintings to the National Museum of the American Indian, settled her affairs (giving the keys to her apartment along with her bankbook and instructions that she should be cremated to a neighbor), and went to the hospital. The doctors ran tests when she arrived, they found no signs of illness, and declared her to be medically healthy. However, before she could be discharged and sent home, Nuñez died at the hospital.

After her death, many of the paintings that weren't donated by Nuñez were taken by the local children who she taught. After her death, Stan Steiner, an author and a friend of Nuñez, located 38 notebooks and diaries she had written over the course of her life, which he then edited and published as a biography entitled Spirit Woman: The Diaries and Paintings of Bonita Wa Wa Calachaw Nuñez.
