= Majel =

Majel may refer to:

== People ==
- Majel Barrett (1932–2008), American actress and producer
- Majel Coleman (1903–1980), American film actress and model
- Majel Davidson (1885–1969), Scottish artist
- Lorena Lucille Majel Dixon, Pauma tribal elder and educator

== Other uses ==
- Marshall Islands (native name M̧ajeļ)
- Google Majel or Google Now, a former virtual assistant
- Majel (food), a Norwegian dish
