= Aguanga, California =

Aguanga
- census-designated place
- Location in Riverside County and the state of California

- Location within the state of California Aguanga (the United States)
- Coordinates: 33°26′34″N 116°51′54″W
- Country: United States
- State: California
- County: Riverside

Area
  - Total: 13.60 sq mi (35.22 km^{2})
  - Land: 13.60 sq mi (35.22 km^{2})
  - Water: 0 sq mi (0.00 km^{2}) 0%
- Elevation: 1,955 ft (596 m)

Population (2020)
  - Total: 989
  - Density: 72.7/sq mi (28.08/km^{2})
- Time zone: UTC-8 (Pacific (PST))
  - Summer (DST): UTC-7 (PDT)
- ZIP codes: 92536
- Area code: 951
- FIPS code: 06-00464
- GNIS feature IDs: 269448; 2582929

Aguanga (/əˈwɑːŋ.ɡə/; Luiseño: Awáanga, meaning "dog place") is a census-designated place located within the Inland Empire in Riverside County, California. It is located about 18 miles (29 km) east of Temecula and 22 miles (35 km) south-southeast of Hemet. Aguanga lies at an elevation of 1955 feet (596 m). As of the 2020 census, it had a population of 989.

== History ==
The town gets its name from a former village of the Native village called awáanga, meaning 'dog place'. Butterfield Overland Mail established a station 1.7 miles to the west of the current post office in 1858. It was at first called Tejungo Station and was located 14 miles east of Temecula Station and 12 miles northwest of Oak Grove Stage Station. The wooden building was located in a grove of trees a few hundred feet from the stage road. Soon, however, it became known as Aguanga Station after the name of the nearby Luiseño village.

The November 7, 1861, report of Lieut. Col. Joseph R. West, mentioned the abandoned station location was then called Giftaler's Ranch, after its German owner Joseph Giftaler, in a journal of his unit's march to Fort Yuma on the old Butterfield Overland Mail route. In a later Civil War itinerary of the route, it is referred to as the "Dutchman's". In 1863, Camp Giftaler Ranch was established at the ranch as a post along the march route of troops to the Arizona Territory by the Union army.

In 1864, Giftaler's Ranch was purchased by Jacob Bergman, also a German immigrant, stagecoach driver and Union army veteran, who operated the Bergman Ranch there for many years until his death on September 13, 1894. After the Civil War, he ran Bergman's Stage Station there for the Banning and Tomlinson Stage lines for many years. During the Julian gold rush, he ran the Guahonga post office there from July 27, 1870, to September 13, 1871. The post office for the area was then moved to Oak Grove until the Bergman post office was opened in 1894, but its name was changed to Aguanga in 1901.

Today the station site is on the Twin Creek Stage Stop Ranch, on Allmouth Road, found just east of the Stagecoach Inn at 43851 Highway 79. The ruins of the old wooden station building and ranch house is located among a grove of trees, at the foot of the west end of the hill at the bottom of the meadow, along the right fork of Allmouth Road. The small, fenced-in Bergman Family Cemetery and the Jacob Bergman Marker are found on Caprice Road, 200 feet from the highway, just across the highway from the entrance to the ranch and a short distance to the east.

=== 2020 shooting ===
On September 7, 2020, deputies with the Riverside County Sheriff's Department responded to reports of an assault with a deadly weapon at a residence on Gibson Road just off Road Runner Lane, along Route 371. Upon responding, they found a woman suffering gunshot wounds, who eventually died from her injuries after being rushed to a hospital. The deputies then discovered six additional victims inside the home, all of whom were dead from gunshots. Authorities believed the shooting was an isolated incident. The residence where the shooting occurred was reportedly being used to grow illegal marijuana. Authorities did not find a motive or any viable suspects. The shooting is the deadliest in Riverside County's history. In 2024, new details came out, no suspects were captured, but police believe the robbery was committed by gang members of Laotian descent, and the motive was drug competition/robbery related, because 1,000 pounds and hundreds of plants of weed were on the property, which is 1-5 million dollars' worth of drugs, and the victims, five women and two men, were recent immigrants from Laos, aged between 44 and 64.

=== Highland Fire ===
At approximately 12:27PM PST on October 30, 2023, the Highland Fire ignited near the intersection of Highlands road and Aguanga Ranchos Road. The vegetation fire was eventually contained on November 5, 2023, at approximately 7PM PST. In total, 2,487 acres burned, including thirteen structures destroyed and two more damaged in the Aguanga Valley near Tule Creek off of the 371. Cal Fire reports two firefighters were injured during the fire.

=== Nixon Fire ===
On July 29, 2024, the Nixon Fire ignited near Tule Valley Road and Richard Nixon Boulevard.

== Geography ==
According to the United States Census Bureau, the CDP covers an area of 13.6 square miles (35.2 km^{2}), all of it land.

The community of Aguanga lies near the intersection of State Route 79 (SR 79) and State Route 371 (Cahuilla Road), along the historic Butterfield Overland Mail stage route. The area lies at about 1,940 feet (590 m) above mean sea level (AMSL) and is north of the Cleveland National Forest. The straight-line distance to Palomar Observatory is 5.9 miles (9.5 km) south, and the observatory site is about 3,500 feet (1,100 m) higher than the community. The town is also home to Cottonwood Elementary School (K–8) operated by the Hemet Valley Unified School District. The largest nearby city is Temecula, along the Interstate 15 corridor, about 17 miles (27 km) west of Aguanga on SR 79.

This area is in a canyon beside Temecula Creek near Pechanga tribal lands and the San Diego County line. Official U.S. Geological Survey NAD27 coordinates for the community are 33°26′34″N 116°51′51″W. It is within area code 951 and shares its ZIP Code, 92536, with the San Diego County community of Holcomb Village.

=== Climate ===
According to the Köppen climate classification system, Aguanga has a hot-summer Mediterranean climate, abbreviated "Csa" on climate maps. The climate makes it significantly easier to grow olive trees, so the Temecula Olive Oil Company is based here.

== Demographics ==
Historical population
Census	Pop.	Note	%±
2010	1,128		—
2020	989		−12.3%
U.S. Decennial Census; 1860–1870 1880-1890; 1900 1910 1920; 1930 1940 1950; 1960 1970 1980; 1990 2000 2010; 2020

Aguanga first appeared as a census designated place in the 2010 U.S. census.

=== Racial and ethnic composition ===
Aguanga CDP, California – Racial and ethnic composition Note: the US Census treats Hispanic/Latino as an ethnic category. This table excludes Latinos from the racial categories and assigns them to a separate category. Hispanics/Latinos may be of any race.
Race / Ethnicity (NH = Non-Hispanic)	Pop 2010	Pop 2020	% 2010	% 2020
White alone (NH)	781	687	69.24%	69.46%
Black or African American alone (NH)	11	9	0.98%	0.91%
Native American or Alaska Native alone (NH)	15	14	1.33%	1.42%
Asian alone (NH)	23	22	2.04%	2.22%
Native Hawaiian or Pacific Islander alone (NH)	0	2	0.00%	0.20%
Other race alone (NH)	1	3	0.09%	0.30%
Mixed race or Multiracial (NH)	23	42	2.04%	4.25%
Hispanic or Latino (any race)	274	210	24.29%	21.23%
Total	1,128	989	100.00%	100.00%

=== 2020 census ===
As of the 2020 census, Aguanga had a population of 989, with a population density of 72.7 inhabitants per square mile (28.1/km^{2}). The age distribution was 9.0% under the age of 18, 5.9% aged 18 to 24, 12.6% aged 25 to 44, 25.1% aged 45 to 64, and 47.4% who were 65 years of age or older. The median age was 64.0 years. For every 100 females there were 97.4 males, and for every 100 females age 18 and over there were 98.7 males age 18 and over.

The census reported that 100% of the population lived in households. 0.0% of residents lived in urban areas, while 100.0% lived in rural areas.

There were 476 households in Aguanga, of which 9.2% had children under the age of 18 living in them. Of all households, 55.0% were married-couple households, 4.8% were cohabiting couple households, 21.4% were households with a male householder and no spouse or partner present, and 18.7% were households with a female householder and no spouse or partner present. About 28.0% of all households were made up of individuals and 18.1% had someone living alone who was 65 years of age or older. The average household size was 2.08. There were 316 families (66.4% of all households).

There were 567 housing units, of which 16.0% were vacant. Of occupied units, 85.1% were owner-occupied and 14.9% were occupied by renters. The homeowner vacancy rate was 2.9% and the rental vacancy rate was 11.3%.

=== 2010 census ===
Aguanga first appeared as a census designated place in the 2010 U.S. census.

== Education ==
It is in the Hemet Unified School District.

== Wildlife Conservation Efforts ==
=== Endangered Animals ===
Several federally and state-listed endangered or threatened animals are found in Aguanga. Conservation efforts are underway to help protect their remaining habitats and restore their populations.

1. Stephens’ Kangaroo Rat (Dipodomys stephensi) This small, hopping rodent is unique to southwestern Riverside County and parts of San Diego County. It prefers open grasslands and is particularly vulnerable to urban sprawl and agriculture. It is listed as endangered and is a focus of regional habitat conservation plans.

2. San Bernardino Kangaroo Rat (Dipodomys merriami parvus) Similar in appearance to the Stephens’ kangaroo rat, this subspecies inhabits rocky, alluvial soils in sage scrub ecosystems. Due to extensive habitat fragmentation, it is listed as federally endangered.

3. Quino Checkerspot Butterfly (Euphydryas editha quino) Once widespread across Southern California, this butterfly now exists in only a few fragmented areas. It depends on specific host plants and sunny, open landscapes. The butterfly's status is federally endangered, and habitat restoration is key to its recovery.

4. Coastal California Gnatcatcher (Polioptila californica californica) This small, gray bird is a resident of the coastal sage scrub ecosystem. Due to widespread destruction of its habitat, it is listed as a threatened species. Preserves near Aguanga play an important role in protecting the species' remaining breeding grounds.

5. Least Bell's Vireo (Vireo bellii pusillus) A riparian songbird, the Least Bell's Vireo was once common but declined dramatically due to loss of riverside vegetation and nest parasitism by cowbirds. It is federally endangered, though its population is beginning to rebound thanks to conservation efforts.

6. Southwestern Willow Flycatcher (Empidonax traillii extimus) This flycatcher depends on dense willow and cottonwood forests along streams. Declines in riparian habitat from water diversion and development have led to its endangered status.

7. Vernal Pool Fairy Shrimp (Branchinecta lynchi) This tiny aquatic animal inhabits seasonal vernal pools that form after rain. These habitats are extremely rare and easily destroyed by land alteration. The shrimp is listed as threatened under the Endangered Species Act.

=== Native Flora of Aguanga ===
The vegetation in Aguanga is just as vital as its wildlife. The region falls within the California Floristic Province, one of the world's largest biodiversity hotspots. Its unique blend of Mediterranean climate and elevation changes supports several plant communities:

==== Coastal Sage Scrub ====
This is the dominant plant in much of Aguanga. It consists of drought-deciduous shrubs such as:

- California Sagebrush (Artemisia californica)
- Black Sage (Salvia mellifera)
- White Sage (Salvia apiana)
- California Buckwheat (Eriogonum fasciculatum)

==== Chaparral ====
On higher, rockier terrain, dense chaparral shrubs dominate. These plants are highly adapted to dry summers and provide food and shelter for many animals, including endangered species. Chaparral plants are fire-adapted and play an important role in erosion control and carbon storage. Key species include:

- Chamise (Adenostoma fasciculatum)
- Manzanita (Arctostaphylos spp.)
- Ceanothus (Ceanothus spp.)

==== Riparian Vegetation ====
Found along streams and wet areas, this vegetation supports birds and amphibians. These areas are crucial for endangered birds like the Least Bell's Vireo and the Willow Flycatcher. Common species include:

- Willows (Salix spp.)
- Cottonwoods (Populus fremontii)
- Western Sycamores (Platanus racemosa)

==== Vernal Pool Flora ====
Seasonal pools host rare wildflowers and grasses. These ephemeral wetlands support a surprising variety of life during the brief wet season like:

- Navarretia spp.
- Downingia spp.
- Hairgrass (Deschampsia danthonioides)
