= Lorena Lucille Majel Dixon =

Pauma tribal elder and educator (1922-2012)

- Born: November 21, 1922; Rincon Indian Reservation
- Died: February 11, 2012 (aged 89); Pauma Indian Reservation
- Citizenship: Luiseño
- Education: Palomar College
- Occupations: Tribal elder and educator
- Spouse: Gene E. Dixon
- Children: Patricia A. Dixon

Lorena Lucille Majel Dixon (November 21, 1922 – February 11, 2012) was a Pauma Tribal Elder of the Luiseño Indians in California, United States.

== Biography ==
Lorena Lucille Majel Dixon was a Luiseño Indian that lived on and was an integral part of the Pauma Indian Reservation. Her parents were educated at Sherman Indian Boarding School.

After her children grew up and attained their own university degrees, Dixon returned to education to earn her associate of arts degree at Palomar College, and they conferred upon her an honorary degree. Dixon continued her work at Palomar College as the first director of their satellite college, the American Indian Education Center.

She was integral in opening the first tribal library with public access on the Pauma Indian Reservation.

She was a tribal leader for many years, and focused her work on committees that improve education. She was tribal chair for four terms.

Dixon's focus on education additionally led her to being part of the Sherman Indian High School Board, the American Indian Advisory Board of the University of California, San Diego, and the Learning Circle. In 1974, Dixon was part of the steering committee for the California Indian Education Association State Conference. She was active in the National Congress of American Indians, and the National Indian Council on Aging.

She co-founded the United Indian Women's Club, founded the first Girl Scout Troop in Pauma Valley, and worked for Solar during World War II as a forklift operator.

=== Personal life ===
In 1947, she married Gene E. Dixon. They had four children.

The couple chose to send their children to public and private schools, and they instilled the value of education and learning.

Dixon's daughter Patricia A. Dixon carries on her mother's legacy of improving education of Native students, and cited her mother's influence as a major factor in her career.

=== Death and legacy ===
Lorena Dixon died on February 11, 2012, in her home on the Pauma Indian Reservation.
