= Pechanga Resort Casino =

Resort and casino near Temecula, California

Coordinates: 33.456002°N 117.106737°W

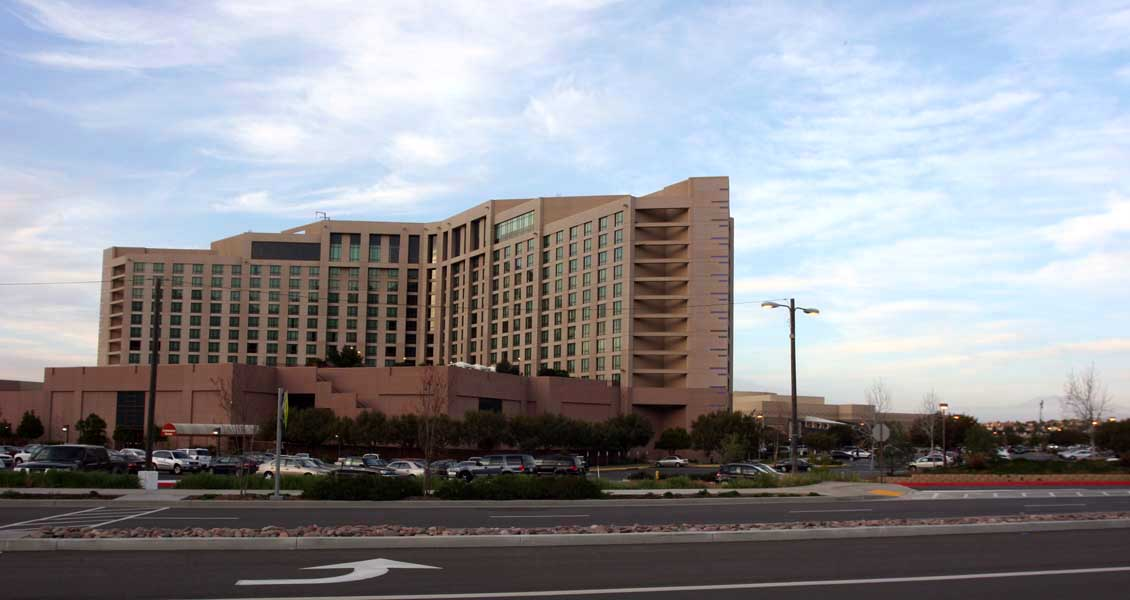
- Interactive map of Pechanga Resort Casino
- Location: 45000 Pechanga Parkway, Temecula, CA 92592
- Opened: June 24, 2002; 24 years ago
- Theme: Native American Casino
- No. of rooms: 1,090
- Gaming space: 200,000 sq ft (19,000 m^{2})
- Notable restaurants: Great Oak Steakhouse; Paisano's; Bamboo; 1882 Cantina
- Casino type: Land-based
- Owner: Pechanga Band of Luiseño Indians
- Renovated in: 2004, 2015-2018
- Website: Pechanga Resort Casino home page

Pechanga Resort Casino is a Native American casino and integrated resort on the Pechanga Indian Reservation adjacent to the city of Temecula, California. It is one of the largest casino/resorts in the United States, with more than 5,400 slot machines and approximately 200,000 sq ft (19,000 m^{2}) of gaming space.

== History ==
The Pechanga tribe had obtained an additional 235 acres of flat land along the Temecula-Pala road in 1907, named the Kelsey tract after the Bureau of Indian Affairs agent who recommended the purchase, C.E. Kelsey. On June 24, 2002, the $262 million Pechanga Resort & Casino opened its doors on the tract. The resort, which was designed to highlight the Pechanga Band of Luiseño Indians' culture, included an 85,000 sq ft (7,900 m^{2}) casino, 1,200-seat showroom, 515,000 sq ft (47,800 m^{2}), 14-story (522-room) hotel and 38,800 sq ft (3,600 m^{2}) convention center, 200-seat cabaret lounge, Eagle's Nest Lounge and seven restaurants.

In November 2004, a 100,000 sq ft (9,300 m^{2}) expansion opened, adding additional gaming space, a high-limit gaming area, a food court area, and Kelsey's, a sports-themed restaurant.

In 2018, Pechanga completed a 27-month, $300 million expansion that doubled its hotel room capacity to 1,090, expanded its spa facility to 25,000 square feet, created a 40,000-square foot events center, and built a 4 ½-acre tropical pool complex that features a dedicated restaurant, swim-up bar, three pools, two waterslides, a fountain, and 27 cabanas. In 2020, after the COVID-19 pandemic, the indoor property was made entirely smoke-free; smoking is permitted in designated areas outside.

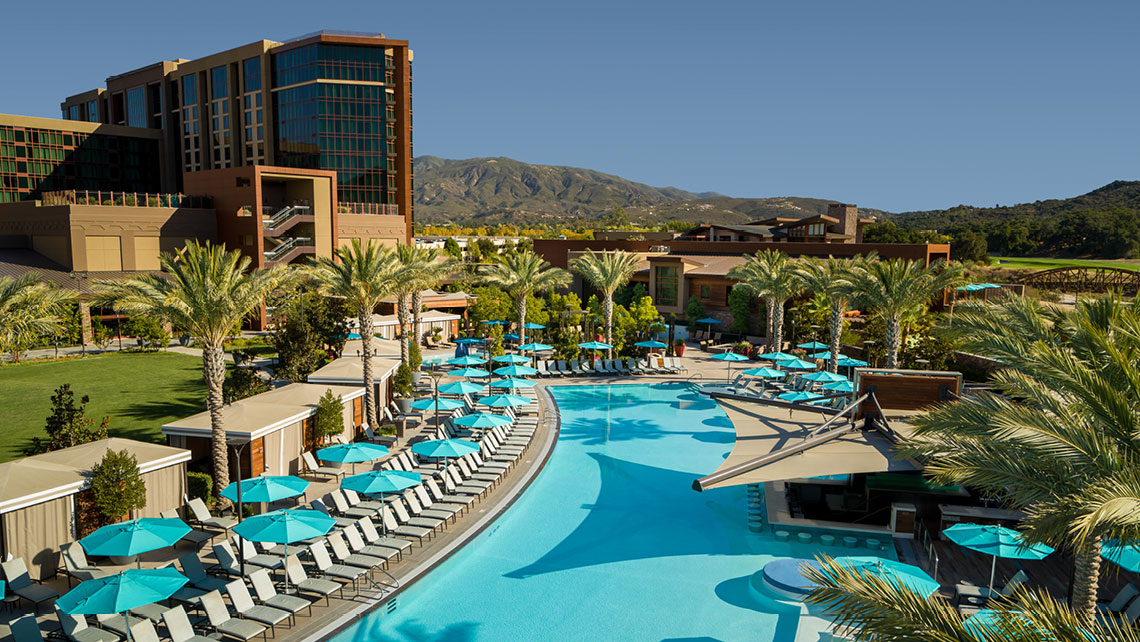

=== Economic impact ===
Pechanga Resort & Casino is the Temecula Valley's largest employer with nearly 4,500 employees, and one of the largest private employers in Riverside County.

== Features ==
=== Casino ===
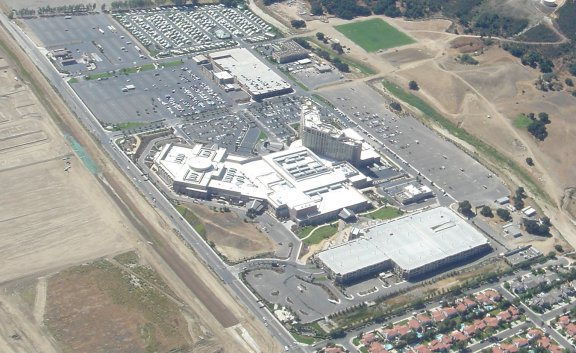
Aerial view of Pechanga Resort Casino, gas station and RV park in 2004

Pechanga Resort Casino has one of the largest casino floors in the country totaling 200,000 square feet, larger than the MGM Grand in Las Vegas. It features more than 5,000 Vegas-style slot machines in a completely non-smoking casino, 152 table games, High Limit Gaming Area with High Limit Salon, and private gaming rooms. In 2024, Smokin' Hot Slots, a smoking permitted slot machine area, opened in the former poker room on the second floor.

Guests must be at least 21 to gamble on the property; the age limit was raised in 2003 from 18.

=== Hotel ===
The Pechanga Hotel includes 1,090 guest rooms and suites, as well as a 4.5-acre pool complex called The Cove (approximately the size of 5 football fields), a luxury spa, and 6 retail stores.

=== Spa Pechanga ===
In December 2017, Spa Pechanga opened a standalone, luxury two-level spa totaling 25,000 square feet and featuring 17 treatment rooms.

=== Restaurants ===
Pechanga has 15 bars and restaurants on its property.

=== Entertainment ===
The Pechanga Theater, a 1,200-seat venue, has hosted Broadway musicals and headline musical acts, including Journey, Lita Ford, Warrant, Dirty Heads, Live (band), Collective Soul, Blues Traveler, Skid Row, 311 (band), Backstreet Boys, Bob Dylan, Eddie Money, Carrie Underwood, The Fab Four (tribute), magician David Copperfield, comedian Jerry Seinfeld, and many foreign artists such as Hong Jin-young and BINI. Pechanga also offers the Pechanga Events Center, a 40,000 square foot facility seating approximately 3,000 people for concerts and shows.

Other entertainment venues at Pechanga include the Pechanga Comedy Club and Eagle's Nest Lounge, located on the top floor of the original hotel tower. (These are currently not open.)

=== Meeting and convention space ===
Meeting space at the facility consists of 274,500 square feet of meeting and event space (100,000 square feet indoors and 174,500 square feet outdoors).

=== Pechanga RV Resort ===
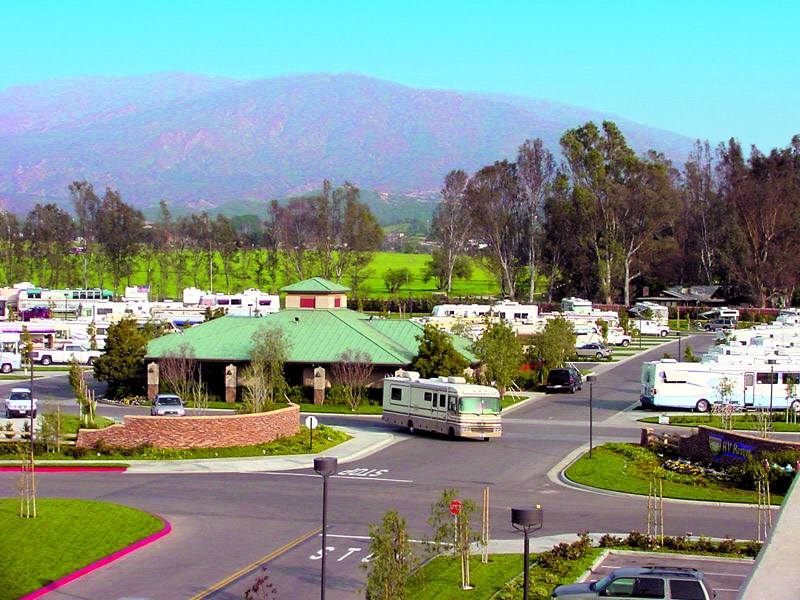
Pechanga RV park

The adjacent Pechanga RV Resort features 210 sites.

== Sports ==
=== Journey at Pechanga ===
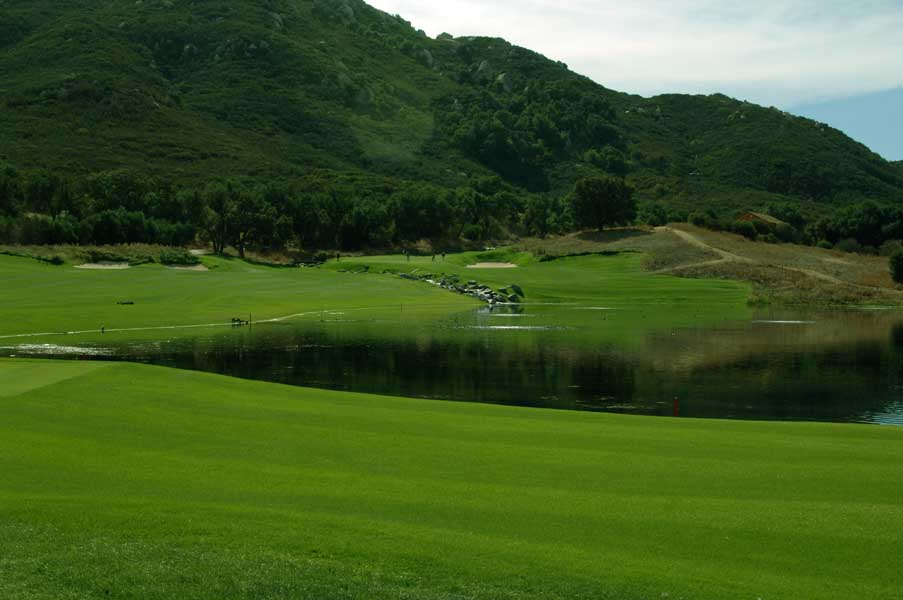
Journey's Hole No. 5

The golf course, Journey at Pechanga, opened in August 2008, and the clubhouse opened in November.

In November 2008, a 62,000 sq ft (5,800 m^{2}) clubhouse was opened. Journey was rated as the 4th "Best New Course You Can Play" by Golf Magazine in the January 2009 issue. With the addition of Journey at Pechanga, the resort's 146-acre (0.59 km^{2}) footprint (including the facility, RV park, parking lots, and structures) has more than tripled to 445 acres (1.80 km^{2}).

=== Live action sporting events ===
Pechanga Resort & Casino hosts live action sporting events such as Bellator MMA, professional boxing aired live on networks such as HBO and FOX and Muay Thai Kickboxing.

== See also ==
- List of integrated resorts
- List of casinos in California
