= Temecula Olive Oil Company =

American olive oil company

Coordinates: 33.4447°N 116.8571°W

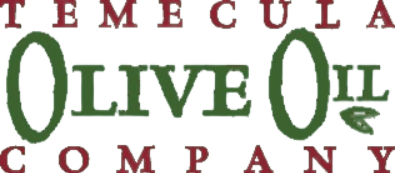

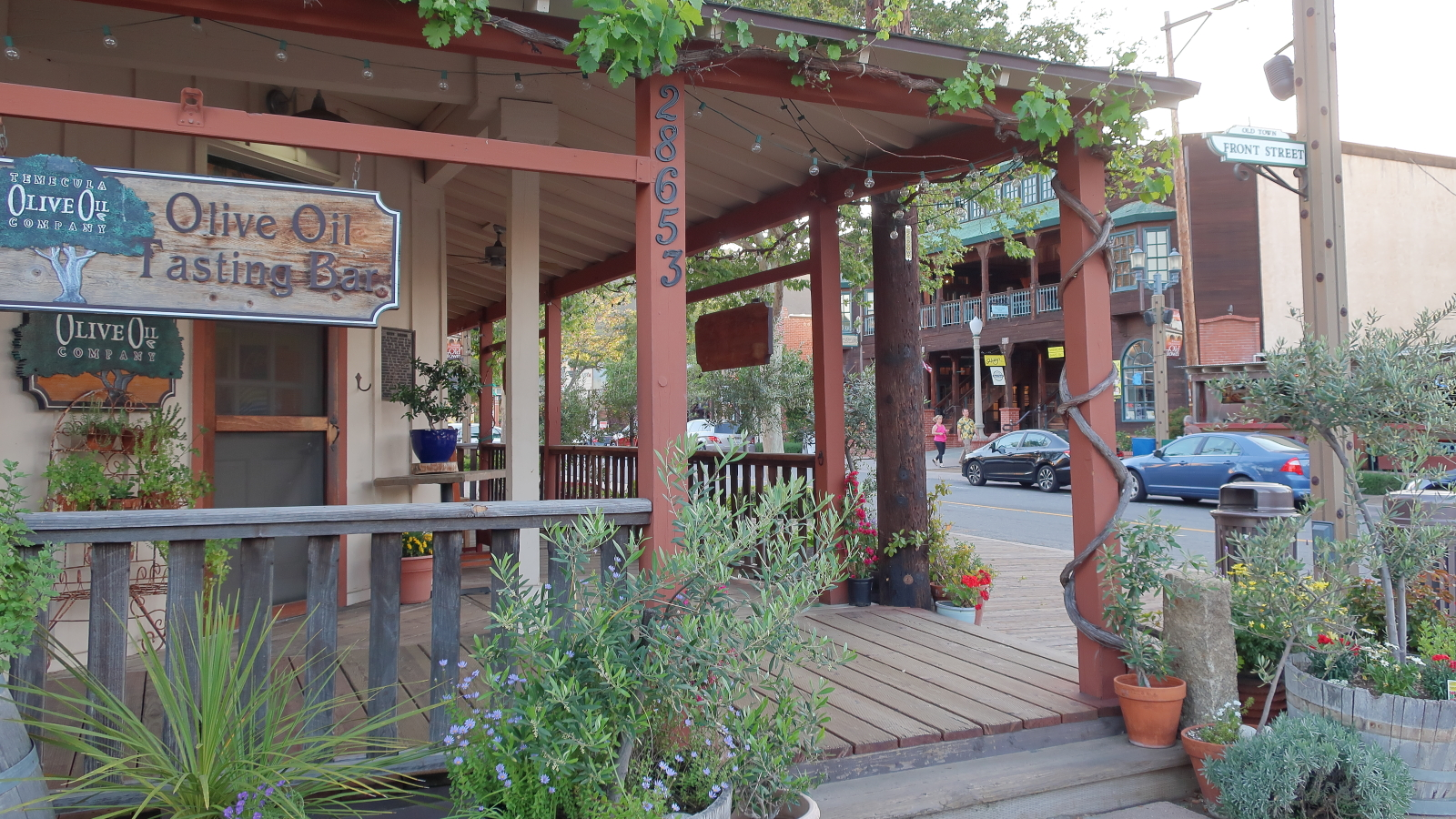
- A tasting bar location in Old Town Temecula
- Type: Private
- Industry: Olive oil
- Founded: 2001
- Founders: Catherine Demuth-Pepe; Nancy Curry; Thom Curry
- Headquarters: Aguanga, California
- Number of locations: 3 (Dec 2024)
- Area served: Southern California
- Key people: Thom Curry (manager)
- Owner: Catherine Demuth-Pepe; Nancy Curry
- Number of employees: 40 (2013)
- Website: temeculaoliveoil.com

Temecula Olive Oil Company is an olive oil manufacturing and bottling company based in Southern California. Founded in 2001, it has several tasting locations and ships its products throughout the United States.

== History ==
The company was founded by friends Catherine Demuth-Pepe and Nancy Curry in 2001. Nancy's husband, Thom, had the idea to make olive oil.

== Products ==
All of the company's olives are sourced from their ranch and flagship store location in Aguanga, California. They have over 35 varieties of trees and sell live ones as well. Ranch tours are occasionally offered. There are many different flavors of olive oil.

The company also sells balsamic vinegar and artisanal food ingredients such as pasta blend, marinara sauce, tapenade, herb blends, sea salt, and stuffed olives.
