= Pablo Tac =

Luiseño convert to Christianity

- Born: c. 1822; Mission San Luis Rey de Francia, Alta California, First Mexican Empire
- Died: 1841 (aged 19); Rome, Papal State
- Citizenship: Luiseño
- Education: Pontificio Collegio Urbano de Propaganda Fide
- Known for: Illustration, writing, scholar

Pablo Tac (c. 1822–1841) was a Luiseño (Quechnajuichom also spelled "Qéchngawichum") Indian and indigenous scholar who provided a rare contemporary Native American perspective on the institutions and early history of Alta California. He created the first writing system for Luiseño, and his work is the "only primary source of Luiseño language written by a Luiseño until the twentieth century."

== Life ==
Tac was born of Luiseño parents at Mission San Luis Rey de Francia and attended the Mission school. A promising student, he (along with another boy) was singled out by the Franciscan missionary, Father Antonio Peyrí, to accompany Peyrí when he left California in 1832. "On January 15, 1834, Father Peyrí, Pablo, and Agapito left San Fernando College [Mexico City] and in February boarded a ship for Europe. They travelled via New York and France, arriving in Barcelona, Spain, on June 21. The 'New' World was coming to meet the 'Old' World." Tac arrived in Rome in September 1834 and was enrolled in the college of Propaganda Fide, studying Latin grammar. He went on to study rhetoric, humanities, and philosophy in preparation for missionary work, but he died in 1841.

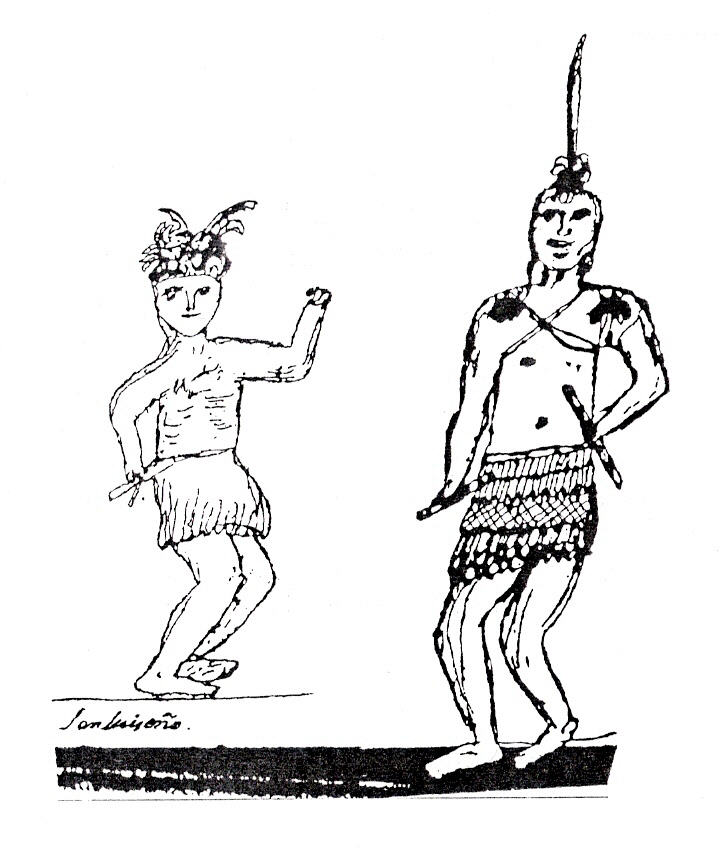
Tac made this drawing depicting two young men wearing skirts of twine and feathers with feather decorations on their heads, rattles in their hands, and (perhaps) painted decorations on their bodies.

== Works ==
As a student, Tac wrote a Luiseño grammar and dictionary for the linguist Giuseppe Mezzofanti, and notably included a history as part of his manuscript. He created a way of writing Luiseño that drew on Latin and Spanish. It is unlike the modern way of writing Luiseño.

Tac also wrote an essay on the "Conversion of the San Luiseños of Alta California." The latter includes information on aboriginal lifeways (including dances and games) and the history and organization of the Mission, along with two drawings by Tac. Tac authored an early account of life at Mission San Luis Rey entitled Indian Life and Customs at Mission San Luis Rey: A Record of California Mission Life by Pablo Tac, An Indian Neophyte (written circa 1835, edited and translated by Minna Hewes and Gordon Hewes in 1958). In the book, Tac lamented the rapid decline of his people:

In Quechla not long ago there were 5,000 souls, with all their neighboring lands. Through a sickness that came to California 2,000 souls died, and 3,000 were left."

Tac went on to describe the preferential treatment the padres received:

In the mission of San Luis Rey de Francia the Fernandino [sic] father is like a king. He has his pages, alcaldes, majordomos, musicians, soldiers, gardens, ranchos, livestock...."

Tac also noted that his people initially attempted to bar the Spaniards from their southern California homelands. When the foreign invaders approached,

"...the chief stood up...and met them," demanding, "...what are you looking for? Leave our country!"

== Commemorations ==
For the 2005 Venice Biennale, Luiseño artist James Luna created an artwork dedicated to the memory of Pablo Tac. The piece, titled Emendatio, included three installations, Spinning Woman, Apparitions: Past and Present, and The Chapel for Pablo Tac, as well as a personal performance in Venice, Renewal. It was sponsored by the National Museum of the American Indian.

On June 7, 2012, a hall at Mission San Luis Rey was named in honor of Pablo Tac.

In July 2019, author Christian Clifford presented the workshop "Pablo Tac: Indian from the far shores of California" in Ohio at the 80th annual Tekakwitha Conference, a Catholic Native American organization.

On June 8, 2021, the Oceanside Unified School District Board of Education announced that it will consider renaming San Luis Rey and Garrison Elementary Schools (combined during the 2019/2020 school year) one of the SLR Renaming Citizens Advisory Committee top three name recommendations of Dolores Huerta, Pablo Tac, or John Lewis Elementary School. After brief presentations on the three proposed names, the OUSDBOE voted 5-0 to rename the combined schools after Pablo Tac.

== See also ==
- Population of Native California
- List of Native American artists
- Visual arts by indigenous peoples of the Americas
