= Saahatpa, California =

- Location within California
- 33°57′29″N 117°01′10″W
- Location: Saahatpa, California

History
- Built: 1845

California Historical Landmark
- Designated: August 17, 1960
- Reference no.: 749

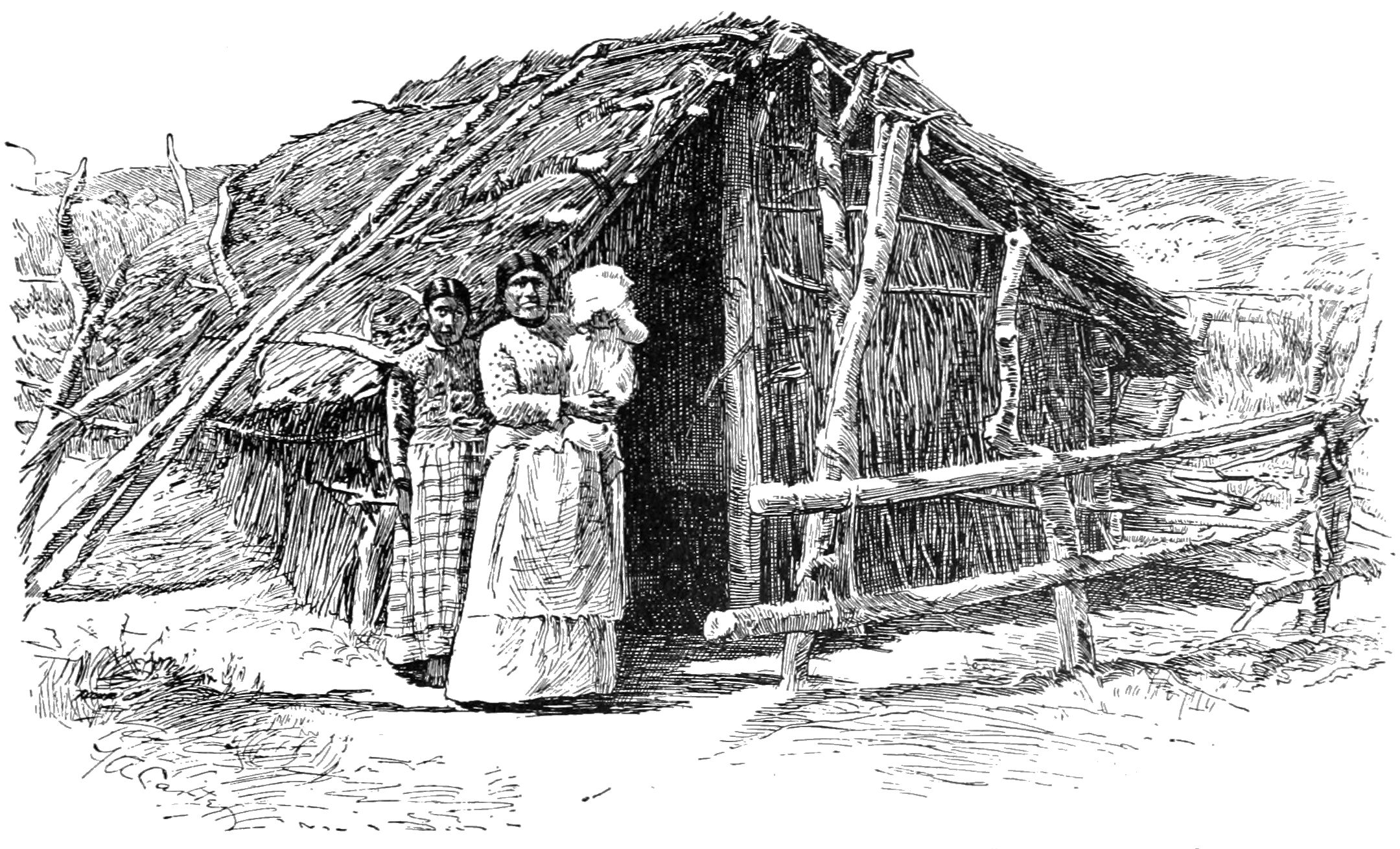
Hut of Mission Cahuilla Indian

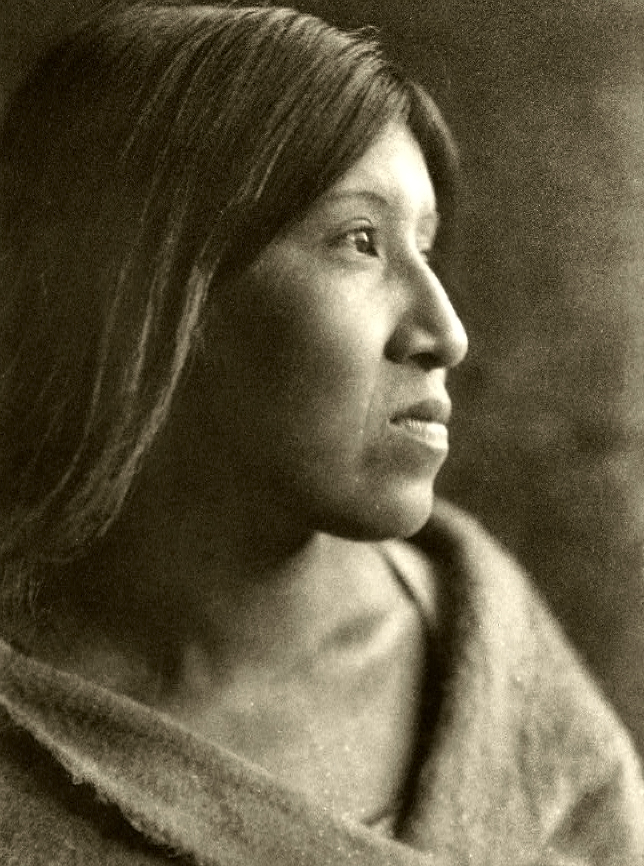
Desert Cahuilla woman by Edward S. Curtis, 1926

Saahatpa was a former Cahuilla settlement in Riverside County. It was a settlement of Juan Antonio's Mountain Cahuilla from 1851 to 1863. It was located in a valley that branched to the northeast from San Timoteo Canyon. The site is marked by California Historical Landmark #749, and is located at the abandoned Brookside Rest Area on westbound Interstate 10 in modern-day Calimesa, California, nearly 3 miles northwest of the I-10/SR 60 junction.

== History ==
Juan Antonio's Mountain Cahuilla were settled in Politana in 1845, to protect the herds of horses and cattle of the Rancho San Bernardino from the raids of bandits and the native tribes from the nearby mountains, the Mojave Desert and Utah. They remained there until 1851 when the Rancho was attacked by the Irving Gang, a band of Americans, claiming to avenge the killing of three Americans in the Cajon Pass, by two men of the Lugo family. As they had done many times before against other bandits, under the authority of the local justice of the peace, Juan Antonio and his men chased all but one of the gang into San Timoteo Canyon, cornered them in a box canyon, surrounded and killed them with arrows.

Word of the incident was mistakenly seen by many of the local Americans as an Indian uprising against them. A militia force from San Diego County was sent to quell this supposed uprising, led by Joshua Bean. Judge Hayes held a hearing and subsequently found their actions had legal justification. However the resentment of local Americans at the killing of fellow Americans led Juan Antonio to move his people away from white settlements in the valley to Saahatpa.

There Juan Antonio and his people remained until the winter of 1862–1863, when a smallpox epidemic swept through Southern California killing many, especially the Native American population who had little immunity to the disease. The victims included Juan Antonio and many of his Cahuilla people, reducing their numbers so they were reduced from a majority to a minority in their own land. After this disaster, Juan Antonio was buried there and Saahatpa was abandoned.

In 1956 an archeological expedition discovered Juan Antonio's body at Saahatpa, identified by his epaulets. He was reburied with military honors.

== Marker ==
Marker on the site reads:

- NO. 749 SAAHATPA - Chief Juan Antonio and his band of Cahuilla Indians helped white settlers in the San Bernardino area defend their property and livestock against outlaws during the 1840s and 1850s. In late 1851, Juan Antonio, his warriors and their families, settled at nearby Saahatpa. During the winter of 1862-63, a smallpox epidemic swept through Southern California killing many Native Americans, including Juan Antonio. Cahuilla tradition asserts that the U.S. Government sent Army blankets that were contaminated with smallpox. After this disaster, Saahatpa was abandoned.

The marker has been inaccessible since about 2005. The Brookside Rest Area, where the marker is located, was closed because the well that had provided a water source ran dry and the water table became inadequate due to a long-running drought. Budget problems several years later contributed to the problem of finding a new water source; in addition, the area has become urbanized since the rest area was built, making its necessity questionable.

== See also ==
- California Historical Landmarks in Riverside County, California
