= Pechanga Band of Indians =

Native American Tribe in Southern California

Coordinates: 33°26′51″N 117°03′48″W

Pechaángayam
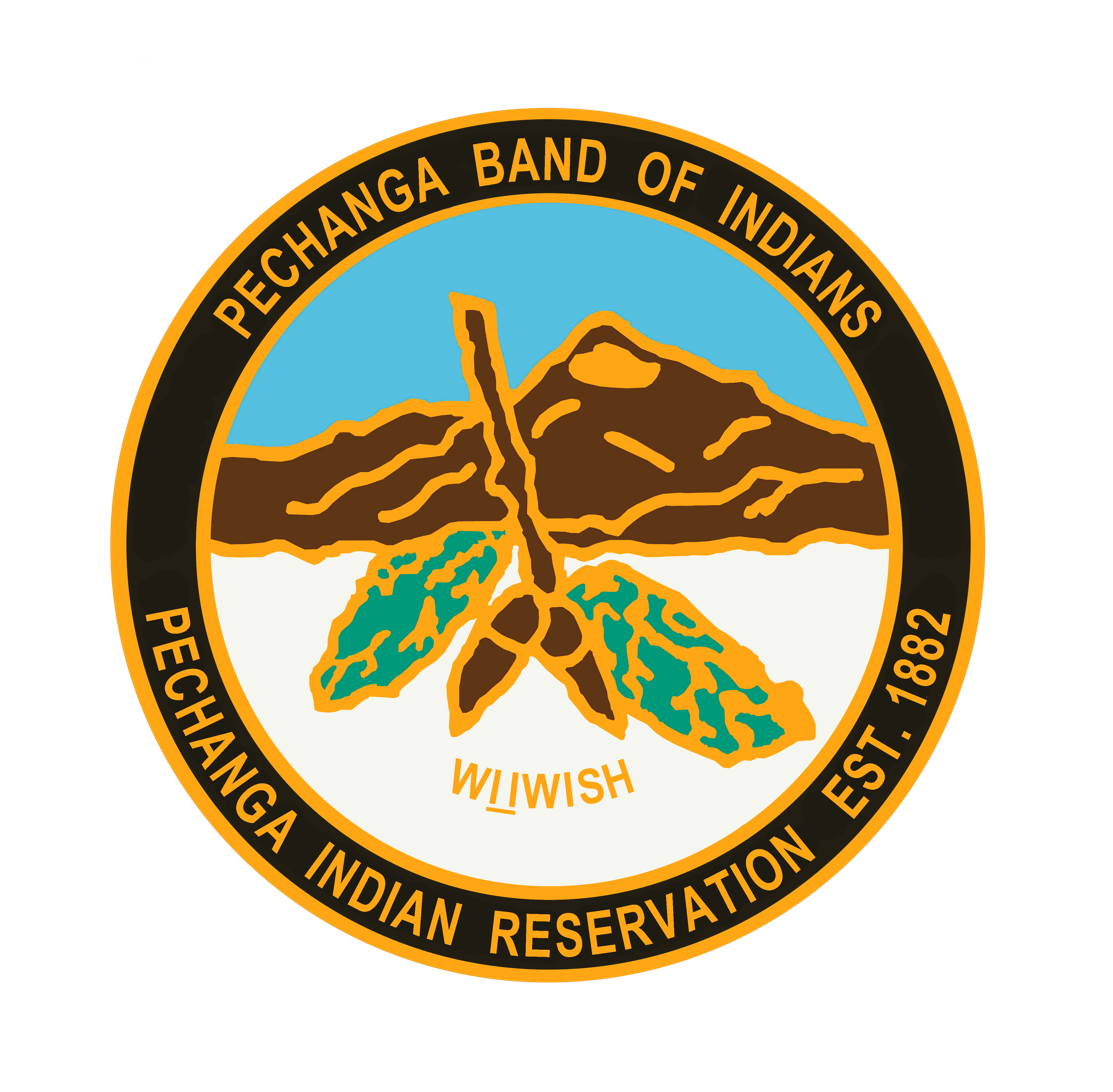
- Pechanga Band of Luiseño Indians emblem

Total population
- 467 reservation population (2011); 1,823 enrolled members (2017)

Regions with significant populations
- United States (California)

Languages
- English, Luiseño

Related ethnic groups
- other Luiseño people

The Pechanga Band of Indians (Luiseño: Pechaángayam) are one of six federally recognized tribes of Luiseño people or Payómkawichum, currently located in Riverside County, California. The modern understanding of the tribal name, Pechanga ("the place where water drips") comes from the displacement of the tribe during their eviction from Temecula in 1875, resulting in movement towards a secluded valley near a spring called Pecháa'a (pechaq for "to drip").

== History ==
=== Pre-European contact ===
Acting as a self-governing population, the Payómkawichum inhabited much of present-day Southern California. Primarily occupied alongside the Kumeyaay nation, Luiseño ancestral territory stretched far, as such loose ownership of land expanded as far north as present-day Riverside, east as present-day Hemet, as south as present-day Carlsbad, and as west as San Nicolas Island. The Pechanga lived in permanent, cone-shaped structures throughout the region, relying heavily on the land around them and the people in their community.

=== Post-contact (1797–1834) ===
The arrival along the Pacific coastline, led by Juan Rodríguez Cabrillo, established a period of mission work in the area, forcing the Pechanga, alongside other tribes, to be relocated. Missions were established throughout the area, with the most controversial to Luiseño bands being the Mission San Luis Rey de Francía, completed June 13, 1798, due to the land built upon being Luiseño ancestral territory. Increasingly exasperated with the situation, the Luiseño did not rebel against the Cabrillo-led mission movement, likely because of their rather friendly and warm nature.

=== Pechanga displacement (1846–1907) ===
The Mexican-American War (1846–1848) did not directly impact the Luiseño, however events following the initial attack would heighten tension between the Native and Mexican parties. A series of conflicts between both parties led to the Pauma Massacre, resulting in the death of eleven Mexican soldiers due to their attempt at stealing horses from the Native population. In an effort of retaliation, Mexican soldiers and some Native accomplices captured numerous Temecula-Natives, resulting in an estimated one hundred Native deaths, though the exact number is unknown. Those whose lives were lost now rest at the Old Temecula Village Cemetery. With the Mexican–American War ending in 1848, the Treaty of Guadalupe Hidalgo was signed, allowing Native bands, such as the Pechanga, to possess legal rights, however the U.S. government recanted citizenship, leaving most absent of land and property rights.

With California becoming a new-state to the union in 1850, the passing of the Act for the Government and Protection of Indians shortly followed. Such act allowed American citizens custody of Native minors, resulting in the large-scale kidnapping of Native children. To combat any efforts of American citizens seizing Native populations, representatives of nearly 200 California tribes came together to sign the Treaty of Temecula, granting land reservation solely to Native populations. In return, the state of California would receive some specified amount of livestock and goods from the land, allowing for an equal trade for both sides. For the Pechanga, Ysidro Toshovwul and Lauriano Cahparahpish represented the tribe, acting in accordance with the majority.

On June 27, 1882, President Chester A. Arthur established the Pechanga Reservation through Executive Order. Primarily inspired by the first-hand viewing of living experience for Pechanga people, author Helen Hunt Jackson served as a moving factor in establishing such reservation. Advocating for the true independence of Pechanga people from American citizenship, Jackson's ability to tell the stories of such Native experiences in the highly-tense area allowed the reservation to be granted to the Pechanga.

== Government ==
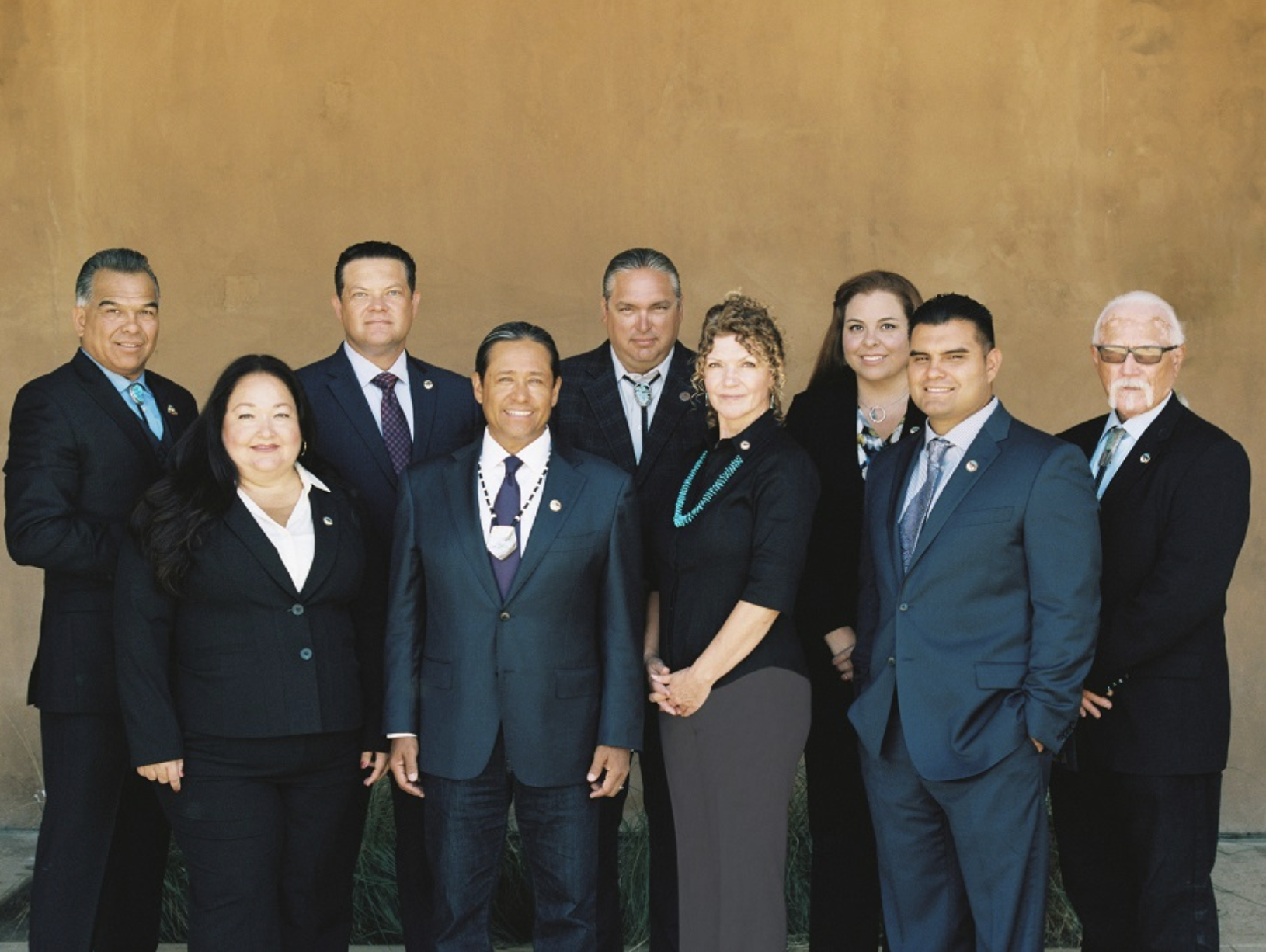
Pechanga Tribal Council

The Pechanga Band is headquartered in Temecula, California, part of the historic territory associated with their historic ancestors. Today the tribe has a constitution, adopted in 1978, and is governed by a democratically elected, seven-person council, including the Tribal Chairperson. For each elected position, general elections are held every two years, with vacancies resulting in impromptu special elections, when necessary. In the event of a voting tie, they would be the deciding vote. The current tribal administration is as follows.

Elected Officials
Member	Position	First elected
Mark A. Macarro	Tribal Chairman	1992
Catalina R. Chacon	Councilwoman	2012
Robert "RJ" Munoa	Councilman	2012
Marc Luker	Councilman	2004
Raymond Basquez Jr.	Councilman	N/A
Michael Vasquez	Councilman	2016
Joseph "Joe" Murphy	Councilman	2022
Louise Burke	Tribal Secretary	2011
Amy Minniear	Treasurer	2022

== Reservation ==
Location of Pechanga Reservation

The Pechanga Reservation (Pecháa’anga) is a federal Indian reservation located near Temecula, California. Established in 1882, 6,724 acre land is divided into four main tracts, being Main Reservation, Kelsey Tract, Zone 5, and Great Oak. Topographically, the reservation sits at elevations from 1,100 feet to 2,600 feet, with the peak located in the southeast of the land. Surrounding the reservation are multiple mountain features, including Wild Horse Peak and Agua Tibia Mountain to the east, Pala Mountain to the south, and Mount Olympus and Gavilan Mountain to the west. In the north, the Santa Rosa mountain range encloses the area.

== Citizenship requirements ==
The 1978 Pechanga Constitution states that members must prove "descent from original Pechanga Temecula people." In 1996, however, the tribal council tightened the rules, declaring that members had to have an ancestor from the subset of Temecula who relocated to the Pechanga valley where the reservation was established. Such tightened rules via the council led to waves of dis-enrollment from 2004 to 2006, with Pechanga officials holding historical residence and descent in the Temecula area as dire in qualification.

Pechanga members moved away in some cases because of economic reasons, but maintained ties to the reservation; including being involved in the nation's activities and development. As with other tribes that have conducted dis-enrollments, which have increased since the late 20th century, controversy has arisen over the application of the 1996 requirements to people of established membership and participation in the nation. Reducing the number of members has increased financial returns paid within the nation from the lucrative casino operations. Pechanga Chairman Mark Macarro has noted that courts have consistently upheld tribes' sole responsibility for determining their citizenship, and that dis-enrollment action was not related to money or politics.

=== Problems regarding citizenship ===
In several cases, the Pechanga have dis-enrolled families who were descended from historic ancestral Temecula, long identified as Pechanga. Such cases involve individuals who participated in the nation, with several members working in a variety of roles for the nation and the casino. In 2005, Rick Cuevas and his family, having lived on the Pechanga reservation as enrolled members of the tribe, were questioned of Native heritage due to Cuevas' great-grandmother, Paulina Hunter. Such woman stood as an original landowner of Pechanga, but denouncement of her Pechanga enrollment created a ripple effect, resulting in 105 of her living descendants becoming stripped of their Pechanga identity. Such choice would result in the denial of membership profit from the Pechanga casino, resulting in a near $120,000 a year check per living member. In 2006, Michael Madariaga and his family experienced a similar situation from their local government, stripping them of their identity with the Pechanga. With the Pechanga questioning the Madariaga family's lineage, Santa Barbara Museum of Natural History anthropologist, John Johnson, was hired to trace his ancestry back to origination. Even with success, the Pechanga rejected the evidence, resulting in Madariaga losing tribal benefits, even pulling money out of his retirement fund to support his then 89-year-old grandfather's prostate cancer expenses, which was previously covered via the tribe's health insurance plan.

Surrounded by accusations of internal greed, the Pechanga find themselves in controversy regarding membership. As of 2012, not much action has ensued regarding Pechanga action with enrolled members.

== Economic development ==
=== Pechanga Resort and Casino ===
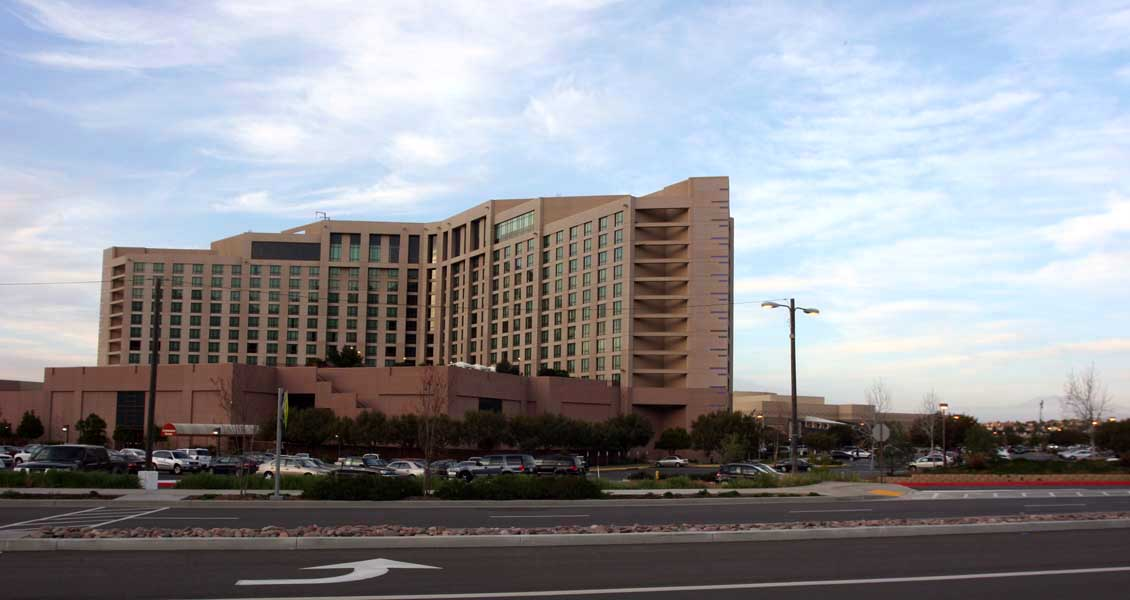
The Pechanga Resort & Casino

Thanks to the Indian Gaming Regulatory Act of 1988, the Pechanga have relied on the Pechanga Resort & Casino as a primary source of reservation income. Opened on June 24, 2002, the $262 million project brings in an estimated $370 million for the reservation, with a large majority of profits going back into the Pechanga community.

=== Great Oak Press ===
The Pechanga Band of Luiseño Mission Indians owns and operates the publisher Great Oak Press.

Established in 2014, the Pechanga created the Great Oak Press. Created to express Pechanga perspective and a glimpse into their culture, the scholarly and academic press also provides insight for grade-school readers, possessing a multitude of K–12 material.

== Culture ==
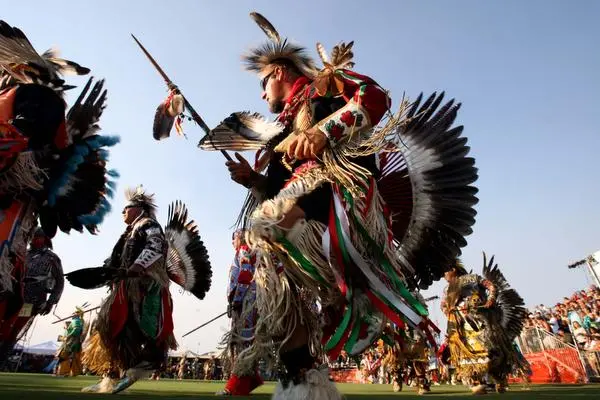
Pechanga Dancer at 2013 Pow Wow

=== Language ===
All Luiseño groups traditionally spoke the Luiseño language. Deriving from the Takic languages, the tribe's dialect finds classification in the Cupan languages sub-division, similar to that of the Cupeño, Cahuilla, and Nicoleño Uto-Aztecan languages. Before European contact along California's coast in 1792, historians expect between 3,000 and 4,000 first-language individuals inhabited the land. In the 21st century, that number has reduced to zero, leaving present-day Luiseño individuals and Pechanga tribe members the task in reviving their native language.

=== Festival / pow wow ===
Though a majority of Pechanga tradition is kept confidential within the tribe, public displays of tradition allow for insight regarding such Native culture. On January 6, 2023, the Pechanga announced their return to festivities, with Pow Wow returning for the first time since 2015, due to construction of the resort/casino's expansion efforts and also the COVID-19 pandemic. During such festivity, small hand-held rattles are used to introduce rhythm and syncopation for the performer, with such items often made from turtle shell, deer hoof, or cocoons. Dance and attire remain in alignment with Pechanga tradition, however limited public knowledge on such area of culture leaves no current depiction of symbolic meaning beyond physical appearance. Such traditional values are accompanied with modern technology and production, with pyrotechnics and fireworks making appearances during the closing of such celebration.

=== Media ===
A majority of public media depicting the Pechanga tribe comes from displays of the Pechanga Resort & Casino, displaying the 275,000 sq ft space. Such advertisements often include overviews of the game opportunity, as well as incoming performers.

The Pechanga Resort garners attention across the region, however such publicity is not the only representation present from Pechanga Natives. On November 6, 2022, the Pechanga tribe made an appearance at a Los Angeles Clippers basketball game, performing a halftime performance for their contest against the Utah Jazz. Led by the Torres-Martinez Desert Cahuilla Bird Singers, the group performed traditional song and dance, presenting the story of Tribal creation through the Pechanga perspective. Such an opportunity stands alone as one of the few notable Pechanga tribe depictions in popular media, with no current film or coverage surrounding the Native population at the time.

== See also ==
- Indigenous peoples of California
