= Ruth-Ann Thorn =

Native American gallerist and filmmaker in California

Ruth Ann Thorn
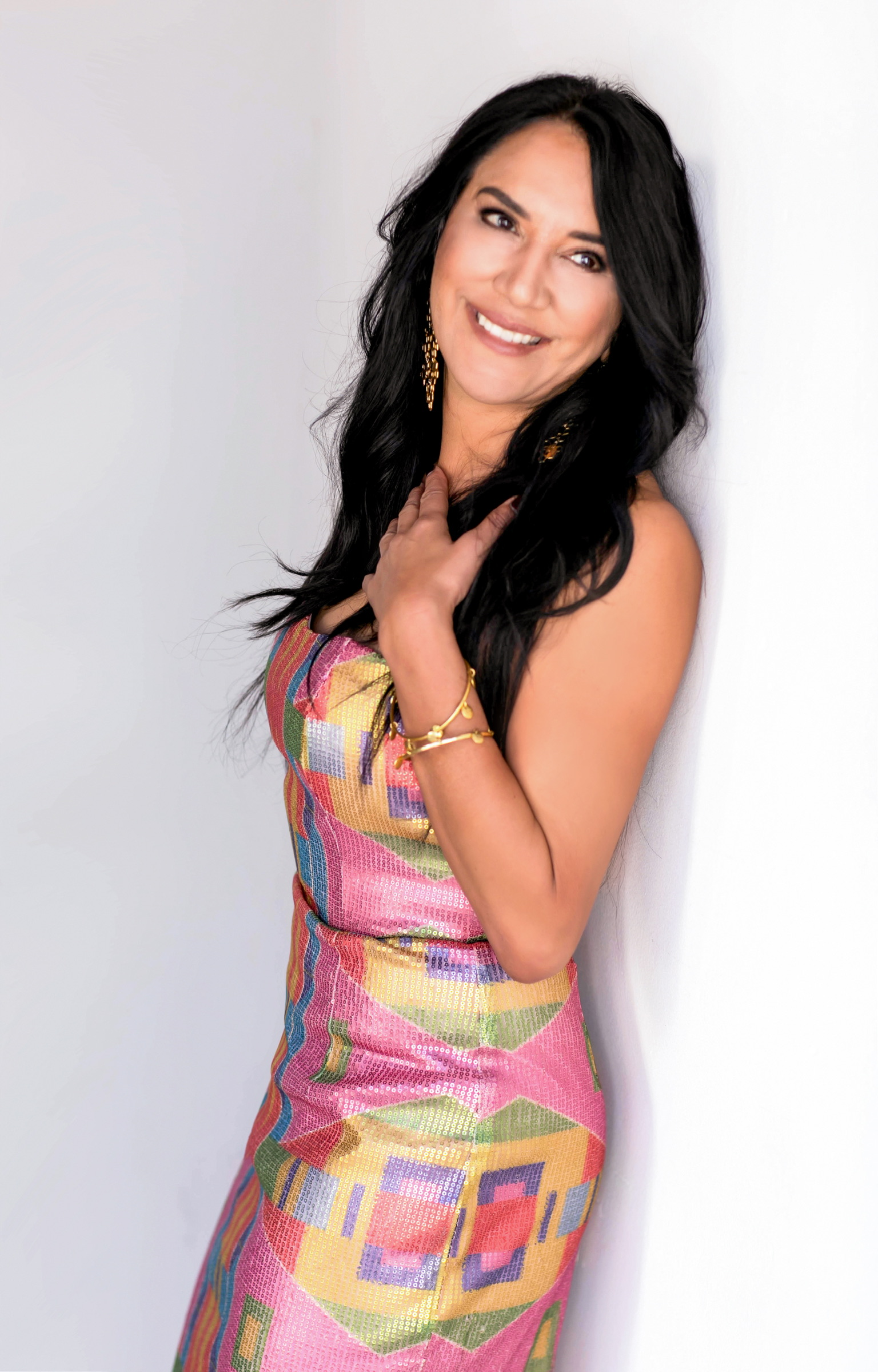
- Born: San Francisco
- Citizenship: Rincon Band of Luiseno Indians and American
- Occupations: Art director, collector, philanthropist
- Years active: 1998

Ruth-Ann Thorn is a Native American gallerist, art collector, art curator, and documentary filmmaker from Vista, California. She promotes Native Americans, especially Luiseños through art.

== Early life and education ==
Thorn was born in San Francisco California to Henry Rodriguez (Rincon Luiseno) who was a part of the American Indian Movement participating in the peaceful Occupation of Alcatraz in 1969, and Gloria Lee (Chinese/Dutch-American), an artist and women's rights activist, and they met in San Francisco during the Indian Relocation Act. When she was five her family moved to Portland and back to San Diego when she was twelve. She started working in restaurant business in her early 20s and admitted in Palomar College where she studied theater and art. She took admission in University of Hawaii for higher studies and worked at Hyatt Regency hotel in the Waikiki Beach area where she worked for five years.

== Career ==
Thorn worked at Images International, one of the prestigious art galleries at Hawaii which went out of business during recession of 1990s. When the company went out of business she thought of setting up her own art gallery, and started selling arts in meeting rooms of hotels loaded in a U-haul trailer. In 1998 Ruth-Ann Thorn and her mother Gloria Lee founded a gallery, EC Gallery.

Before the inception of EC Gallery, Thorn worked at an art gallery, Images International of Hawaii, in Hyatt Regency hotel in the Waikiki Beach area and this inspired Thorn to open her own Art Gallery. After spending 5 years at Images she wanted to open her own art gallery but couldn't open because she was refused a loan from the bank. In 1998 she opened her first art gallery in La Jolla and closed that and opened one at Fashion Valley in San Diego. In 2002 she opened Crown Thorn Publishing representing unknown artists and bringing them to market. Thereafter she opened several art galleries in different cities of the USA. She opened a 5,000 sq ft gallery in Solana Beach in November 2018.

She has been working with the Tribal Council and Cultural Committee for presenting the cultural and historical aspects of the tribes through art. For this purpose, she is currently building an art gallery devoted entirely to Native American artists. She has worked with Rincon Band of Luiseño Indians, Sycuan Band of the Kumeyaay Nation and other tribal administrations. Currently she is the Chairwoman of Rincon Economic Development Corporation. In April 2022 she organized an event, "This is Indian Country", featuring the work of Native American Artists to promote the local culture, arts and artists. Seven Artists were chosen for this event.

She co-founded Imprint, a blockchain-based art security registry, to protect Native American art from fraud and in collaboration with Southwestern Association of Indian Arts (SWAIA) supplied 800 Native American artists with permanently certified Imprint digital title to their artwork .

== Represented artists ==
Thorn picks unknown artists for EC Gallery and brings them to the attention of collectors. She brought internationally acclaimed artists Michael Flohr, Henry Asencio, Christopher M, and Michael Summers to the attention of art collectors.

== Art of the City ==
She has developed a YouTube channel, "Art of the City" where she airs the art shows and documentaries for which she will travel to different localities. Since inception Thorn had spread the location of EC Gallery to different localities of USA, now she will bring artist from different regions and plans to host two shows; “Winter Wonderland” in January and “Hearts and Flowers” in February.

Thorn started a documentary series, “Art of the City” in 2019 aimed at helping people understand that an art is not just a piece of art, it has a whole story of life experience of the artist. Locale and art are interconnected, and without knowing the locale we can’t understand the theme of the art. When patrons know the artist personally they’ll be able to understand the art in a better way.

For this, she has been traveling across the United States interviewing those artists who have resided in a specific city for more than 25 years. In Santa Fe she interviewed Roxanne Swentzell, George Rivera, Raymond Nordwall, and Nocona Burgess. In San Diego, she interviewed prominent artists from diverse backgrounds; James Hubbell, Victor Ochoa, Michael Flohr, and Gloria Lee. In New Orleans, she interviewed Willie Birch, Michael Guidry, Molly Maguire “Magwire”, James Michalopoulos, and Brandon “B-Mike” Odums.”

== This is Indian Country ==
Thorn’s new documentary TV series, "This is Indian Country" premiered on FNX in November 2022 featuring modern native Americans, creating in various genres, including art music, culinary arts, dance, comedy, and other creative disciplines

== Awards and recognitions ==
- 2022 - Thorn was featured as "The Fashion 2022 Issue" by Native Max Magazine.
- 2019 - Thorn worn The American Art Award (AAA) for her gallery, Exclusive Collection Gallery.
- 2015 - Thorn won The American Art Awards (AAA) for her gallery, Exclusive Collection Gallery.
