= Stan Steiner =

American historian and teacher (1925–1987)

Stan Steiner (1925–1987) was an American historian and teacher who authored works generally focusing on American minority communities and their relationship to the broader U.S. society as well as the mythology of the American frontier. Born in the Coney Island area of New York, New York, he wrote a number of books touching upon various subjects from the 1960s to 1980s. He expressed particular interest in indigenous American peoples and their complex history into the 20th century. As an instructor, he lectured at a variety of U.S. institutions, including the University of New Mexico.

== Life and career ==
Although his writings became strongly associated with the American heartland, Steiner was born in the Coney Island area of New York, New York. After moving around in his early years, he underwent studies at the University of Wisconsin. His parents had immigrated to the U.S. from the nation of Austria.

Specific works by Steiner include The New Indians (1968), La Raza: The Mexican Americans (1970), The Vanishing White Man (1976), and The Ranchers: A Book of Generations (1980). As a professor, he notably taught at the University of New Mexico. He lectured at various other U.S. institutions as well.

A 1976 article on his then latest book by Kirkus Reviews remarked that it was "to Steiner's credit that he includes the testimony of other Western voices" regular readers studying the U.S. frontier don't often hear, including "a Hopi elder, a thoughtful young Indian activist, a white Montana rancher, Senator Abourezk of South Dakota, Black Elk's granddaughter, and others." The analysis of The Vanishing White Man, looking into the cultural contrast argument about modern U.S. citizens breaking the 'circle of life' cycle and connection to the land held by prior generations of indigenous American peoples, followed-up from similar observations made in his 1968 book that he titled The New Indians.

The same publication praised his later work The Ranchers: A Book of Generations. In it, Steiner detailed the lives of a group of ranchers living in traditional fashion within several rural areas, the author going into the individualist approaches aiming at maintaining self-sufficiency that the men and women had struggled with. Finding the "not sentimental" work still "sometimes moving", Kirkus Reviews declared, "As a composite picture of the vanishing rancher, the volume is [an] informative... [and] historically valuable antidote to the TV cowboy".

Steiner died of a heart attack in 1987 inside his home in Santa Fe, New Mexico. He was 62 years old. A collection of his essays was later put together in 1991 under the title The Waning of the West, receiving acclaim from publications such as Publishers Weekly. Writer John Nichols composed the book's foreword.

== Viewpoints ==
Several years after the historian's death, Publishers Weekly remarked,

Concerned with the varied ethnic groups that contributed to the spirit of individualism, freedom and expansiveness... of the area, Steiner... [wrote] about Anglos, Hispanics, Navajos and the Chinese, who built many of the railroads. With the decline of the family farm and the virtual abandonment of many small towns, he saw the spirit of the West fading, although he believed that the legend of the region might live on.

Earlier in his life, Steiner had been a caustic critic of U.S. President Richard Nixon, arguing that the administration had sold out national interests in the West to private efforts by corporations.

== See also ==
- American frontier
- Frederick Jackson Turner
- Frontier thesis
- History of Native Americans in the United States
- History of Mexican Americans

== Bibliography ==
- Stan Steiner (1968). The New Indians. Harper & Row.
- Stan Steiner (1970). La Raza: the Mexican Americans. Harper.
- Luis Valdez; Stan Steiner (1972). Aztlan: An Anthology of Mexican American Literature. Vintage Books. ISBN 978-0-394-71770-8.
- Stan Steiner (1976). The Vanishing White Man. Harper & Row. ISBN 978-0-06-014078-6.
- Stan Steiner (1980). The Ranchers: A Book of Generations. Knopf : distributed by Random House.
