= Pauma Band of Luiseno Mission Indians =

Native Luiseño Indians in Southern California

Pauma Band of Luiseño Mission Indians of the Pauma and Yuima Reservation
Total population
- 236 enrolled tribal members, 186 reservation population (2011)

Regions with significant populations
- United States (California)

Languages
- English, Luiseño

Related ethnic groups
- other Luiseño people

The Pauma Band of Luiseño Mission Indians of the Pauma and Yuima Reservation is a federally recognized tribe of Luiseño Indians in San Diego County, California. A total of five other federally recognized tribes of Luiseño are located in southern California.

== Government ==
The Pauma Band is headquartered in Pauma Valley, California. The tribe is governed by a democratically elected tribal council. As of May 2024, the current tribal council is as follows:

- Tribal Chairman: Temet A. Aguilar
- Vice Chairman: Sophia Salgado
- Secretary: Patricia A. Dixon
- Treasurer: Jenna Aguilar Linton
- Member at Large: Martina Garcia

== Reservation ==
Location of Pauma and Yuima Reservation

The Pauma and Yuima Reservation (33°21′48″N 116°57′18″W), also known as the Pauma Indian Reservation, is a federal Indian reservation located in the northeastern corner of San Diego County. The reservation is 5,877 acres (2,378 ha) in size. The Pauma and Yuima Reservation was established in 1872.

The main Pauma reservation and tribal headquarters are located in the Pauma Valley below Palomar Mountain. Two small and unpopulated tracts of land make up the Yuima reservation in the foothills of the Palomar Mountains east of the main reservation.

The adjoining Pala Indian Reservation lies along the western border. The closest community is Valley Center, lying southwest of the reservations.

=== Demographics ===
Pauma and Yuima Reservation, California – Racial and ethnic composition Note: the US Census treats Hispanic/Latino as an ethnic category. This table excludes Latinos from the racial categories and assigns them to a separate category. Hispanics/Latinos may be of any race.
Race / Ethnicity (NH = Non-Hispanic)	Pop 2000	Pop 2010	Pop 2020	% 2000	% 2010	% 2020
White alone (NH)	13	14	6	6.99%	6.80%	3.35%
Black or African American alone (NH)	0	0	0	0.00%	0.00%	0.00%
Native American or Alaska Native alone (NH)	135	122	151	72.58%	59.22%	84.36%
Asian alone (NH)	0	1	3	0.00%	0.49%	1.68%
Native Hawaiian or Pacific Islander alone (NH)	0	0	2	0.00%	0.00%	1.12%
Other race alone (NH)	0	0	0	0.00%	0.00%	0.00%
Mixed race or Multiracial (NH)	7	7	0	3.76%	3.40%	0.00%
Hispanic or Latino (any race)	31	62	17	16.67%	30.10%	9.50%
Total	186	206	179	100.00%	100.00%	100.00%

== Economic development ==
The Pauma Band of Luiseño Mission Indians owns and operates Casino Pauma, Pauma Bay Café, Casino Pauma Deli, Red Parrot Pizza, and the Red Parrot Lounge, all located in Pauma Valley. Gaming revenues support the health, welfare, and education of their people, as well as for infrastructure.

== Education ==
The reservation is served by the Pauma Elementary School District and Escondido Union High School District.

== See also ==
- Indigenous peoples of California
