= Henry Bugbee =

American existentialist philosopher

- Born: 19 February 1915; New York City, New York, United States
- Died: 18 December 1999 (aged 84); Missoula, Montana

Education
- Education: Princeton University, BA; University of California, Berkeley, PhD

Philosophical work
- Era: 20th-century philosophy
- Region: Western philosophy
- Institutions: University of Montana

Henry Bugbee (19 February 1915 – 18 December 1999) was an American philosopher and professor. In his writing he explored a strain of existentialist thought with a distinctive emphasis on wilderness.

In his best known work, The Inward Morning: A Philosophical Exploration in Journal Form, Bugbee addresses the nature of consciousness and the meaning of place through reflections on his encounters with the natural world and his readings of past philosophers. Through these personal meditations, Bugbee presents a moving and urgent account of the way toward the integrated moral life.

Educated at Princeton and University of California, Berkeley, Bugbee taught at Stanford, Harvard, and the University of Montana, where he was named professor emeritus.

== Biography ==
Henry Greenwood Bugbee Jr. was born 19 February 1915 in New York City, New York. In 1936 he received his B.A. in philosophy from Princeton. He enrolled at University of California, Berkeley, but he suspended his studies during World War II and served in the Navy as a commander of a minesweeper in the South Pacific. He returned to Berkeley after the war, and he received his PhD in 1947.

After a brief appointment at Stanford, Bugbee accepted a position at Harvard University. At the time, the Department of Philosophy was chaired by W.V.O. Quine, and, despite their differences in their approaches to the discipline of philosophy, Bugbee spoke well of his time there. However, citing his lack of publications, Harvard eventually denied Bugbee tenure, and he left the university.

In 1958, Bugbee took a position at the University of Montana. Serving twice as department chair, Bugbee would remain at the university until his retirement in 1979, and the university maintains an endowed lecture in his honor. When Quine spoke at the university he noted Bugbee was "the ultimate exemplar of the examined life." He died in Missoula in 1999.

== Publications ==
- 1958: The Inward Morning: A Philosophical Exploration in Journal Form. State College, PA: Bald Eagle Press. (Republished Athens, GA: University of Georgia Press, 1999).
- 2017: Wilderness in America: Philosophical Writings. New York: Fordham University Press. Editor, David W. Rodick.
