= Richard Lee Bugbee =

Native American culture keeper (1948–2023)

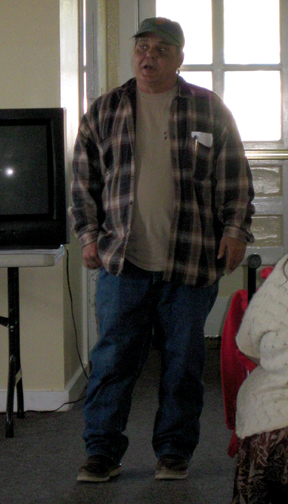
- Born: 6 February 1948; Saipan
- Died: 15 October 2023 (aged 75)
- Scientific career
- Fields: ethnobotanist

Richard Lee Bugbee (February 6, 1948 – October 15, 2023) was a Native American of the Payómkawichum (Luiseño) people and culture keeper and ethnobotany instructor in San Diego, California.

== Early life ==
Bugbee attributed his love of plants to his cowboy grandfather, John Peters.

Bugbee attended five high schools as the family moved. Having never gotten a college degree, Bugbee took courses at Santa Monica, Grossmont, Cuyamaca, Mira Mesa, Palomar, Fresno City, and San Diego City Colleges.

As a young adult in the mid-1960s, he became a psychedelic light technician. This specialty led to numerous interactions with musicians including Janis Joplin, Alice Cooper, Canned Heat, and the Grateful Dead.

== Career ==
Starting in 2005, Bugbee began his academic career as an instructor of Kumeyaay Ethnobotany and Ethnoecology at Cuyamaca College through Kumeyaay and Cuyamaca Community Colleges. Jane Dumas assisted with the course until her death in 2014. For this class, Bugbee and Dumas wrote “Kumeyaay Ethnobotany Reader," a widely disseminated 92-page document of names, uses, and botanical characteristics of the most widely used plants. This work led Bugbee into being a consultant for published books on plant uses.

Bugbee also taught indigenous material cultures and traditional plant uses of southern California at many museums including the Oakland Museum of California and the Phoebe Hearst Museum, and at botanical gardens and Indian reservations. He was an instructor for summer cultural programs for several Kumeyaay tribes and for Intertribal Youth/Native Like Water. His stated goal was to use indigenous knowledge to serve as a bridge that connects the wisdom of the Elders with today's youth.

As a museum curator and educator, Bugbee was Curator of the Kumeyaay Culture Exhibit at the Southern Indian Health Council (1994–2004), the Associate Director/Curator of the San Diego American Indian Culture Center & Museum, and the Indigenous Education Specialist for the San Diego Museum of Man/Us (1989–2005).

Bugbee was a member of the Native American Council for California State Parks (1991–1995), California Indian Basketweavers’ Association (CIBA), the Land Conservancy, and the Elder's Circle for the U.S. Fish and Wildlife Service (2006–2008). A 2009 Alliance for California Traditional Arts (ACTA) fellowship created an opportunity for him to teach the traditional tribal sport of Waw’lish.

Being an important member of the indigenous community led to invitations to join the Board of Directors of organizations such as the Board of Indigenous Regeneration (Mata’Yuum). As a language advocate, Bugbee was chairman of the board of directors for the Advocates for Indigenous California Language Survival (AICLS) (2000–2023), where he was associate director and curator of the American Indian Culture Center and Museum in San Diego, as well as Director and Curator of the Kumeyaay Culture Center and exhibit at the Southern Indian Health Council. In 2016 he was featured in episode five, "Gathering Medicine", of the PBS program Tending the Wild about native land practices in California.

Bugbee was the ethnobotanist for the Traditional Indian Health Program through Riverside-San Bernardino (Counties) Indian Health providing information on the interactions between traditional plant and pharmaceutical medicines. Most recently, Bugbee was chosen for the Elder's Indigenous Climate Fellow (2020–2021) for the San Diego Climate Science Alliance, where he provided guidance and direction for the Climate Science Alliance Tribal Working Group.

The important lesson he shared from Elder Jane Dumas involved proper behavior when picking plants. When you pick a plant “ask for permission, tell your intent for the plant, and say a prayer for the plant."

== Personal life ==
Bugbee had four children, Jason C. and Ginger Lee with his former wife, Carol Renn Bugbee, and Cheyenne and Heather C. with Kelly Ann Dewolf.

In 1980, he met Kumeyaay elder Jane Dumas, an ethnobotanist from Jamul Indian Village who was the daughter of famous Kumeyaay healer, Isobel Thing. Within two years, she had accepted Bugbee as her apprentice when he showed a true interest in healing plants.

From 1990 to 1992, he led a group of Native American dancers to Brisbane, Australia, forming the dance ensemble Mak’sho which included the Munajali Yogumbeh (Australian) and Te Ahwina (New Zealand) traditional people. He was adopted into a Maori family following this activity.
