= Maurice Bugbee =

American football and basketball coach

Biographical details
- Born: October 17, 1914; Illinois, U.S.
- Died: November 12, 1975 (aged 61); San Diego, California, U.S.

Coaching career (HC unless noted)

Football
- 1939–1941: Aurora

Basketball
- 1941–1942: Aurora

Head coaching record
- Overall: 6–13–3 (football); 1–12 (basketball)

Maurice Alden Bugbee (October 17, 1914 – November 12, 1975) was an American football and basketball coach. He served as the head football coach at Aurora University in Aurora, Illinois from 1939 to 1941. He served as the school's head basketball coach from 1941 to 1942.

Bugbee later moved to Long Beach, California, where he was the executive director of the local Boys Club.

== Head coaching record ==
=== Football ===
Year	Team	Overall	Conference	Standing	Bowl/playoffs
Aurora Spartans (Independent) (1939–1941)
1939	Aurora	2–5			
1940	Aurora	2–2–3			
1941	Aurora	2–6			
Aurora:		6–13–3			
Total:		6–13–3			
