= Pauma massacre =

1846 killing in the Mexican–American War

Coordinates: 33.2820°N 116.6336°W

The Pauma massacre occurred in December 1846, at Pauma Valley north of Escondido, California. Luiseño Indians killed eleven Mexicans, Californio lancers who had stolen horses from them. The action was related to a series of regional conflicts during the Mexican–American War and followed the Battle of San Pasqual in California. Fundamentally, it was also related to the appropriation of Mission Luiseno land from the Luiseño after the successful mission with a population of 3,000 was secularized in 1833. Gov. José Figueroa had granted the Luiseño three pueblos including Las Flores and San Pascual. Pío Pico was to hold the mission land in trust for the government as administrator pending a decision on what to do with it. Eventually, Pico took Las Flores as his personal ranch. Pico was the man who led the Mexicans at the battle of San Pascual. The Kumeyaay Indians lived at San Pascual, though the Kumeyaay were from the next mission, San Diego, they also viewed Pio Pico with distrust, and their sympathies for the Americans may have been decisive, given their knowledge of the terrain in which they lived. The Mexicans lost and afterwards took 11 horses from a nearby Luiseño community, which then retaliated by killing 11 Mexican Californio soldiers at the Massacre of Pauma.

== Background ==
After the Battle of San Pasqual, the Californio lancers, a Mexican military force, broke up into different groups. A group of eleven men traveled to Rancho Pauma, owned by Jose Antonio Serrano. Along the way, the men stole a herd of fine horses belonging to the Pauma band of the Luiseño and retreated to the rancho.

Serrano, his fourteen-year-old son Jésus, and his brother-in-law Jose Aguilar had gone to Pala, where Serrano's wife and other children were staying. Before leaving, Serrano was said to overhear two Luiseño women discussing a plot to capture the Californios.

== The events ==
In the evening Chief Manuelito Cota (also called Chief Manuel) took a group of the Pauma band with him to Rancho Pauma. The chief knocked on the door and introduced himself. The Californios knew the chief and had peaceful relations with him. When the Californios opened the door, the chief and his men captured the lancers.

They took eleven prisoners to El Potrero, an Indian rancheria, for the night. The next day the party traveled to Aqua Caliente (now known as Warner Springs). Chief Manuel called the area bands together for a tribal council to decide the fate of the horse thieves.

The tribal leaders decided the Californios should undergo ritual torture and execution for their crimes against the Pauma band.

== Killed in the Pauma Massacre ==
1. Manuel Serrano
2. Ramon Aguilar
3. Francisco Basualdo
4. José María Alvarado
5. Mariano Dominguez
6. Santiago Osuna
7. Jose Lopez
8. Estaquio Ruiz
9. Juan de la Cruz
10. Unnamed New Mexican
11. Santos Alipas

== Aftermath ==
When word of the massacre reached Mexican forces in Los Angeles, General José María Flores designated José del Carmen Lugo of San Bernardino to lead a group of soldiers to avenge the lancers' deaths. The soldiers carried out their mission with the aid of allied Cahuilla Indians. They killed an estimated 33-40 Luiseño warriors, including the leaders who had authorized the earlier attack on the Californios. The action was called the Temecula Massacre.

== See also ==
- List of massacres in California
