= Luiseño =

Indigenous ethnic group of California, US

Payómkawichum Luiseño
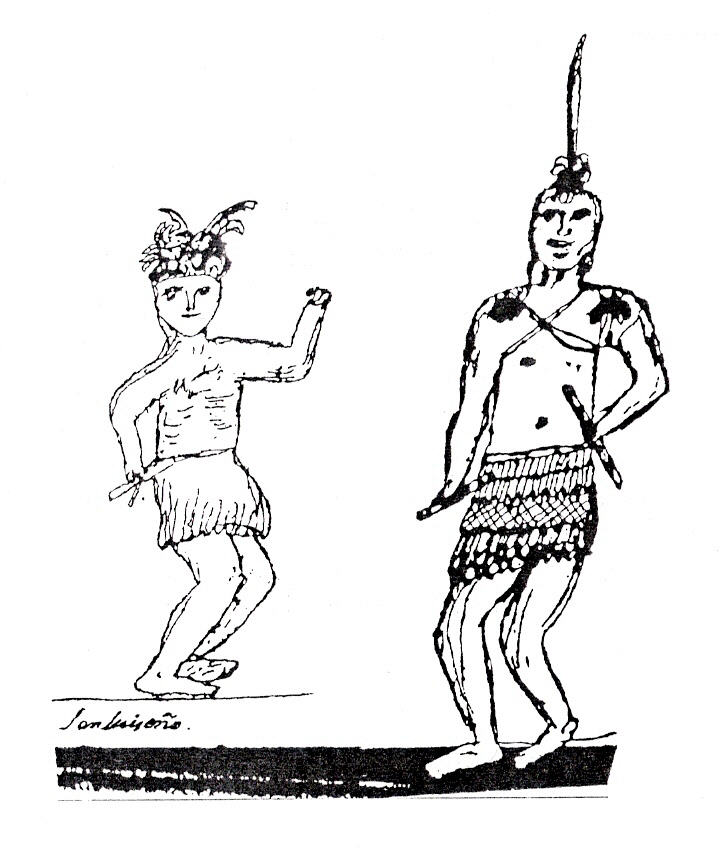
- Drawing of Luiseño men in traditional dance regalia, by Pablo Tac (Luiseño, 1822–1844)

Total population
- 2,500 (including Ajachmem people)

Regions with significant populations
- United States (California)

Languages
- English and Spanish, formerly Luiseño

Religion
- Traditional tribal religion, Christianity

Related ethnic groups
- Juaneño, Cupeño, Cahuilla, Serrano, Gabrielino-Tongva, Kumeyaay, and Chemehuevi

The Luiseño or Payómkawichum are an Indigenous people of California who, at the time of the first contacts with the Spanish in the 16th century, inhabited the coastal area of southern California, ranging 50 miles (80 km) from the present-day southern part of Los Angeles County to the northern part of San Diego County, and inland 30 miles (48 km). In the Luiseño language, the people call themselves Payómkawichum (also spelled Payómkowishum), meaning "People of the West." After the establishment of Mission San Luis Rey de Francia (The Mission of Saint Louis King of France), "the Payómkawichum began to be called San Luiseños, and later, just Luiseños by Spanish missionaries due to their proximity to this San Luis Rey mission.

Today there are six federally recognized tribes of Luiseño bands based in southern California, all with reservations. Another organized band is not federally recognized.

== History ==
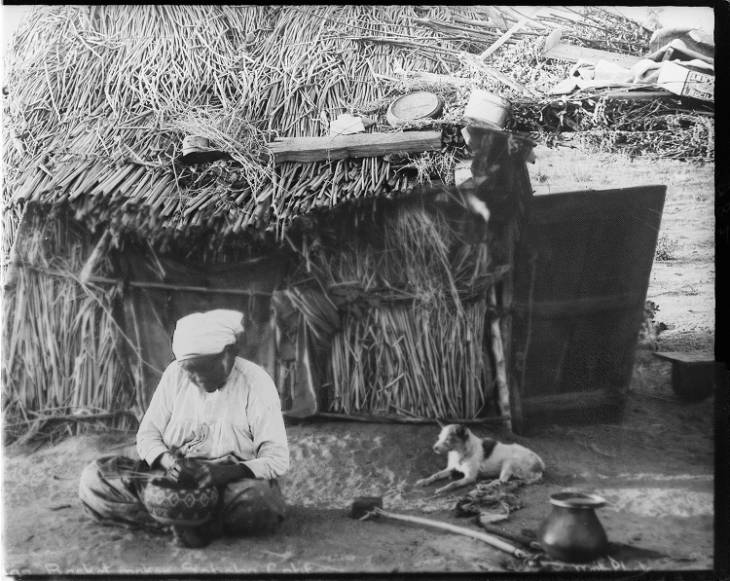
Luiseño basket maker outside of her home

=== Pre-colonization ===
The Payómkawichum were successful in utilizing a number of natural resources to provide food and clothing. They had a close relationship with their natural environment. They used many of the native plants, harvesting many kinds of seeds, berries, nuts, fruits, and vegetables for a varied and nutritious diet. The land also was inhabited by many different species of animals which the men hunted for game and skins. Hunters took antelopes, bobcats, deer, elk, foxes, mice, mountain lions, rabbits, wood rats, river otters, ground squirrels, and a wide variety of insects. The Luiseño used toxins leached from the nuts of California buckeye to stupefy fish in order to harvest them in mountain creeks.

Estimates for the pre-contact populations of most native groups in California have varied substantially. In the 1920s, A. L. Kroeber put the 1770 population of the Luiseño (including the Juaneño) at 4,000–5,000; he estimated the population in 1910 as 500. The historian Raymond C. White proposed a historic population of 10,000 in his work of the 1960s. Pablo Tac, born in 1820, recorded, "perhaps from oral history and official records" that approximately five thousand people were living in Payómkawichum territory prior to the arrival of the Spanish.

=== Mission period ===
The first Spanish missions were established in California in 1769. For nearly 30 years, Payómkawichum "who lived in the autonomous territories on the mesas and coastal valleys" in the western region of their traditional territory, "witnessed the constant incursion of caravans that moved north and south through their land on El Camino Real."

Spanish missionaries established Mission San Luis Rey de Francia entirely within the borders of Payómkawichum territory in 1798. Known as the "King of the Missions," it was founded on June 13, 1798, by Father Fermín Francisco de Lasuén, located in what is now Oceanside, California, in northern San Diego County. It was the Spanish First Military District.

=== Mexican period ===
The Mexican Empire assumed ownership of Payómkawichum lands after defeating Spain in the Mexican War of Independence in 1821. The following year, Mexican troops confiscated all coastal lands from the Payómkawichum in 1822, granting much of the land to Mexican settlers, who became known as Californios, to develop the land for agriculture.

==== Mexican-American War ====
The Payómkawichum did not actively participate in the war, but fell victim to the violence following the Battle of San Pasqual. Eleven Californio lancers from the battle arrived at Rancho Pauma and stole horses from the Pauma Band of the Luiseno. The Pauma Band apprehended the thieves and sought to punish them and initially let them off with a warning. However, an American present at the trial successfully convinced the Luiseño to execute them, leading to the execution of all Californio thieves known to the Californios as the Pauma Massacre.

News of the execution reached the Mexican General José María Flores in Los Ángeles; he sent a Mexican force under José del Carmen Lugo in retaliation to execute the chiefs responsible for executing the Californios. Along the way Lugo met with a group of Cahuilla led by Cooswootna (Juan Antonio), who decided to join forces to attack their Payómkawichum rival. News of the advance reached Temecula, leading the Payómkawichum to hide in the nearby caves and canyons. The allied forces took the high ground on the meadows and the Payómkawichum troops charged up the hill to meet them, leading to the Temecula massacre. The battle killed over 100 Temecula Payómkawichum and the Payómkawichum were defeated. The captured soldiers were handed over to the Cahuilla, who executed all of the prisoners. The Mormon Battalion later reached Temecula and allowed the survivors to bury their dead.

=== American period ===
After the war, Payómkawichum leaders entered negotiations to sign the Treaty of Temecula and Treaty of San Luis Rey to protect their lands, but the treaties remained unratified. After the admission of the State of California, the state allowed White Americans to impose indentured servitude on Indigenous Californians under the Act for the Governance and Protection of Indians.

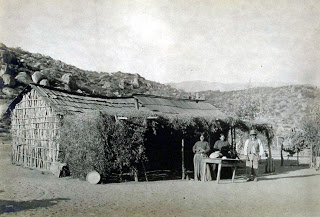
Luiseño home in 1900 in the Temescal valley

In 1875, President Ulysses S. Grant allowed reservations to be established in the area. That same year, the state of California evicted the Payómkawichum in the Temecula Valley to be redistributed to American ranchers. In 1882, another round of reservations was permitted to be established under President Chester A. Arthur after the details of the Temecula eviction scheme were revealed.

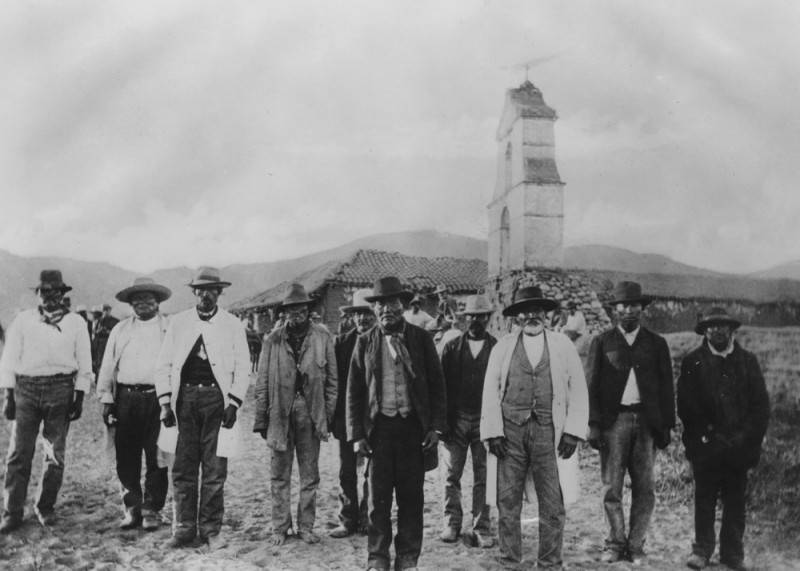
Group of Luiseño men at Pala

Boarding school programs were established to assimilate the Payómkawichum into subservience and American culture, whose children were enrolled into the Sherman Indian School in Riverside. The Pauma, Pala, and Rincon Bands sued for the right to enroll their children at local schools.

Gems were discovered around the Pala Reservation in the 1890s, extracting pink tourmaline, pegmatite, and morganite beryl (the latter being the first discovery of the gem of its kind). Pink tourmaline quickly became the top export as Dowager Empress Cixi of the Qing dynasty spoke highly of the gem in 1902, which became the tribe's main export until 1911 when the Dowager died.

The Payómkawichum were allowed to pursue gambling operations on their reservations after its legalization in the 1980s, which allowed them to establish several casinos in their reservations in the 2000s, including but not limited to the Pala Casino Resort and Spa (2000), Pechanga Resort & Casino (2002), and Harrah's Resort Southern California (2004). This newfound wealth also allowed the Pechanga Band to purchase the naming rights to the San Diego Sports Arena, now known as Pechanga Arena.

During the October 2007 California wildfires, the Poomacha Fire ravaged the La Jolla Indian Reservation, destroying 92% of the reservation. State and federal agencies provided aid to rebuild the tribe's facilities and residents of the tribe were able to return to the reservation by the end of the next year.

== Language ==
The Luiseño language belongs to the Cupan group of Takic languages, within the major Uto-Aztecan family of languages. About 30 to 40 people speak the language. In some of the independent bands, individuals are studying the language, language preservation materials are being compiled, and singers sing traditional songs in the language. Pablo Tac, born at San Luis Rey in 1822, devised a written form of Luiseño language through "his study of Latin grammar and Spanish" while working "among international scholars in Rome." Although Tac had to conform to "Latin grammatical constructions, his word choice and his narrative form, along with his continual translation between Luiseño and Spanish, establish an Indigenous framework for understanding Luiseño."

== Tribes today ==
Today Luiseño people are enrolled in the following recognized tribes and one unrecognized tribe:

Luiseño reservations with federally recognized tribes and an unrecognized organization (blue).

Luiseño/Payómkawichum Tribes
Reservation	Location	Associated Village(s)	Political Recognition	Population	Area in mi^{2} (km^{2})			Includes ORTL?
Reservation	Location	Associated Village(s)	Political Recognition	Population	Land	Water	Total	Includes ORTL?
La Jolla Band of Luiseño Indians	San Diego County	Húyyulkum Táaxanashpa	Federal; 1875	476	13.50 (34.96)	0	13.50 (34.96)	no
Pala Band of Luiseño Indians	San Diego County	Páala	Federal; 1903	1,315	20.35 (52.71)	0	20.35 (52.71)	no
Pauma Band of Luiseño Indians	San Diego County	Páawma	Federal; 1882	206	9.36 (24.25)	0	9.36 (24.25)	no
Pechanga Band of Luiseño Indians	Riverside County	Pecháa’anga	Federal; 1882	346	7.01 (18.16)	0.0024 (0.0061)	7.02 (18.17)	no
Rincon Band of Luiseño Indians	San Diego County	Wáșxa	Federal; 1875	1,215	6.16 (15.96)	0	6.16 (15.96)	yes
Soboba Band of Luiseño Indians	Riverside County	Șuvóova	Federal; 1883	482	10.62 (27.50)	0.19 (0.48)	10.80 (27.97)	yes

The San Luis Rey Band of Mission Indians, or Qéeʼish, located in San Diego County, is an unrecognized organization with 600 members.

== Villages ==
=== Riverside County ===
- 'áaway, on a head branch of Santa Margarita River
- Awa’, Aguanga
- Chawimai, Los Duraznos, Cahuilla valley
- Hurúmpa, west of Riverside
- Méexa, on Santa Margarita River northwest of Temecula
- Pawi, warm spring in middle of village at Cahuilla valley
- Páayaxchi, on Elsinore Lake
- Pichaang, Pechanga
- Șuvóowu Șuvóova, east of San Jacinto Soboba
- Táa'akwi, at the head of Santa Margarita River
- Teméeku, east of Temecula

=== San Diego County ===
- 'ahúuya, near the upper course of San Luis Rey River
- 'akíipa, near Kahpa
- 'áalapi, San Pascual south of the middle course of the San Luis Rey River
- Húyyulkum, on the upper course of San Luis Rey River
- 'ikáymay, near San Luis Rey Mission
- Qáxpa, on the middle course of San Luis Rey River
- Katúktu, between Santa Margarita and San Luis Rey Rivers, north of San Luis Rey
- Qée'ish, Qéch, south of San Luis Rey Mission
- Qewéw, on the upper course of San Luis Rey River
- Kóolu, near the upper course of San Luis Rey River
- Kúuki, on the upper course of San Luis Rey River
- Kwáa'alam, on the lower course of San Luis Rey River
- Maláamay, northeast of Pala
- Mixéelum pompáwvo, near Escondido
- Ngóoriva
- Pa'áa'aw, near Tái Palomar mountain
- Páala, at Pala
- Páalimay, on the coast between Buena Vista and Agua Hedionda Creeks, Carlsbad
- Panakare, north of Escondido
- Páașuku, near the headwaters of San Luis Rey River
- Páawma, east of Pala Pauma
- Pochóorivo, on the upper course of San Luis Rey River
- Sóowmay, south of the middle course of San Luis Rey River
- Șakíshmay (Luiseño or Diegueño), on the boundary line between the two peoples
- Șíikapa, Palomar, west of Escondido
- Táaxanashpa, La Jolla
- Táakwish poșáppila, east of Palomar Mountain
- Tá'i, close to Palomar Mountain
- Tapá'may, north of Katúktu
- Tómqav, west of Pala
- 'úshmay, at Las Flores
- Waxáwmay, Guajome on San Luis Rey River above San Luis Rey
- Wiyóoya, at the mouth of San Luis Rey River
- Wi'áasamay, east of San Luis Rey
- Wáșxa, Rincon near the upper course of San Luis Rey River
- Yamí', near Húyyulkum

== Notable Luiseños ==
- Richard Lee Bugbee (1948–2023), culture keeper and ethnobotany instructor
- Pete Calac (1892–1968), football player
- Freddy Herrera, musician
- Sky Hopinka (b. 1984), is a visual artist and film-maker
- James Luna (1950–2018), performance artist
- Bonita Wa Wa Calachaw Nuñez (1888-1972), painter
- Jamie Okuma (b. 1977), beadwork artist, fashion designer
- Fritz Scholder (1937–2005), painter and sculptor
- Ruth-Ann Thorn (b. 1965), art dealer, documentary film maker
- Pablo Tac (1822–1841), scholar
- Shelbi Nahwilet Meissner, feminist philosopher
- Kilma Sibimoat Lattin (born 1978), leader, businessman, and military veteran

== See also ==
- Luiseño language
- Luiseño traditional narratives
- Mission Indians
- Pauma Massacre
- Temecula Massacre
- USS Luiseno (ATF-156)
- Kumeyaay people
