= Luiseño language =

Uto-Aztecan language of California

Luiseño
- Luiseño–Juaneño
- Chamtéela
- Native to: United States
- Region: Southern California
- Ethnicity: 2,500 Luiseño and Juaneño (2007)
- Extinct: early 2010s
- Revival: 2010s
- Language family: Uto-Aztecan: Northern; Takic?; Cupan; Luiseño
- Dialects: Luiseño; Juaneño

Language codes
- ISO 639-2: lui
- ISO 639-3: lui
- Glottolog: luis1253
- ELP: Luiseño
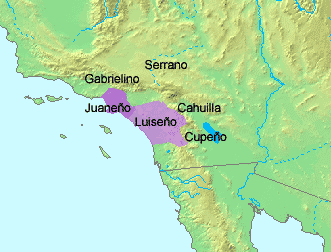

- Luiseño is classified as Critically Endangered by the UNESCO Atlas of the World's Languages in Danger.

Luiseño, or Chamtéela, is a Uto-Aztecan language of California spoken by the Luiseño people. The Luiseño are a Native American people who at the time of first contact with the Spanish in the 16th century inhabited the coastal area of southern California, ranging 50 miles (80 km) from the southern part of Los Angeles County, California, to the northern part of San Diego County, California, and inland 30 miles (48 km). The people are called "Luiseño", owing to their proximity to the Mission San Luis Rey de Francia.

== History ==
The language went extinct in the early 2010s, but an active language revitalization project is underway, assisted by linguists from the University of California, Riverside. The Pechanga Band of Luiseño Indians offers classes for children, and in 2013, "the tribe ... began funding a graduate-level Cal State San Bernardino Luiseño class, one of the few for-credit university indigenous-language courses in the country." In 2012, a Luiseño video game for the Nintendo DS was being used to teach the language to young people.

=== Documentation ===
Linguist John Peabody Harrington made a series of recordings of speakers of Luiseño in the 1930s. Those recordings, made on aluminum disks, were deposited in the United States National Archives. They have since been digitized and made available over the internet by the Smithsonian Institution.

== Phonology ==
=== Vowels ===
Luiseño has ten vowel phonemes, five long and five short.

| | Front | Central | Back |
|---|---|---|---|
| Close | ɪ iː | | ʊ uː |
| Mid | ɛ eː | | ɔ ɔː |
| Open | | a aː | |

Diphthongs include ey [ej], ow [ow] and oow [oːw].

Luiseño vowels have three lengths.

- Short: The basic vowel length. In writing, this is the standard value of a given vowel, e.g. ⟨a⟩.
- Long: The vowel is held twice as long but with no change in quality. In writing, a long vowel is often indicated by doubling it, e.g. ⟨aa⟩.
- Overlong: The vowel is held three times as long but with no change in quality. In writing, an overlong vowel is indicated by tripling it, e.g. ⟨aaa⟩.

Overlong vowels are rare in Luiseño, typically reserved for absolutes, such as interjections, e.g. aaashisha, roughly "haha!" (more accurately an exclamation of praise, joy or laughter).

==== Variants ====
For some native speakers recorded in The Sparkman Grammar of Luiseño, the allophones [ə] and [ɨ] are free variants of [e] and [i] respectively. However, other speakers do not use these variants. Sparkman records fewer than 25 Luiseño words with either [ə] or [ɨ]. For one of these words (ixíla "a cough") the pronunciations [əxɨla] and [ɨxɨla] are both recorded.

Unstressed [u] freely varies with [o]. Likewise, unstressed [i] and [e] are free variants.

==== Vowel syncope ====
Vowels are often syncopated when attaching certain affixes, notably the possessive prefixes no- "my", cham- "our", etc. Hence polóv "good", but o-plovi "your goodness"; kichum "houses" (nominative case), but kichmi "houses" (accusative case).

==== Accent ====
A stress accent most commonly falls on the first syllable of a word.

A single consonant between a stressed and unstressed vowel is doubled. Most are geminate, such as w [wː] and xw [xːʷ]. However, some take a glottal stop instead: ch [ʔt͜ʃ], kw [ʔkʷ], qw [ʔqʷ], ng [ŋʔ], th [ðʔ], v [vʔ], x [xʔ] (Elliott 1999: 14–16.)

As a rule, the possessive prefixes are unstressed. The accent remains on the first syllable of the root word, e.g. nokaamay "my son" and never *nokaamay. One rare exception is the word pó-ha "alone" (< po- "his/her/its" + ha "self"), whose invariable prefix and fixed accent suggests that it is now considered a single lexical item (compare noha "myself", poha "him/herself", etc.).

=== Consonants ===
Luiseño has a fairly rich consonant inventory.

Luiseño consonant phonemes
| | | Labial | Dental | Alveolar | Palatal | Velar | Uvular | Glottal |
|---|---|---|---|---|---|---|---|---|
| Nasal | | m [m] | n [n] | | | ng [ŋ] | | |
| Plosive | voiceless | p [p] | t [t] | | ch [tʃ] | k [k], kw [kʷ] | q [q], qw [qʷ] | ꞌ [ʔ] |
| Plosive | voiced | (b [b]) | (d [d]) | | | (g [ɡ]) | | |
| Fricative | voiceless | (f [f]) | s [s̪] | ꟍ [s̺] | sh [ʃ] | x [x] ~ [χ], xw [xʷ] | | h [h] |
| Fricative | voiced | v [v] | th [ð] | | | | | |
| Approximant | | | l [l] | | y [j] | w [w] | | |
| Rhotic | | | r [ɾ] ~ [r] | | | | | |

- /b/, /d/, /f/, /ɡ/ are found only in borrowed words, principally from Spanish and English.
- Both [ʃ] and [tʃ] are found in word initial position. However, only [tʃ] occurs intervocalically, and only [ʃ] is found preconsonantally and at word final position. Examples of these allophones in complementary distribution abound, such as yaꞌásh ('man nom') and yaꞌáchi ('man acc').
- /r/ is trilled at the beginning of a word and a tap between vowels.
- The two sibilants have also been described as dental and retroflex [ʂ] (Elliott 1999: 14).

== Orthography ==
Along with an extensive oral tradition, Luiseño has a written tradition that stretches back to the Spanish settlement of San Diego. Pablo Tac (1822–1841), a native Luiseño speaker and Mission Indian, was the first to develop an orthography for his native language while studying in Rome to be a Catholic priest. His orthography leaned heavily on Spanish, which he learned in his youth. Although Luiseño has no standardized spelling, a commonly accepted orthography is implemented in reservation classrooms and college campuses in San Diego where the language is taught.

The alphabet taught in schools is:

ꞌ ꞌa ch ꞌe h ꞌi k kw l m n ng ꞌo p q qw r s ꟍ (Note: ⟨Ꟍ ꟍ⟩ were added to Unicode in 2024. Previously ⟨s̸⟩ with a combining diacritic was used. When fonts did not support that, ⟨ş⟩ was used as a substitute.) sh th t ꞌu v w x xw y

Current orthography marks stress with an acute accent on the stressed syllable's vowel, e.g. chilúy "speak Spanish", koyóowut "whale". Formerly, stress might be marked on both letters of a long vowel, e.g. koyóówut, or by underlining, e.g. koyoowut "whale"; stress was not marked when it fell on the first syllable, e.g. hiicha "what" (currently híicha). The marking of word-initial stress, like the marking of predictable glottal stop, is a response to language revitalization efforts.

The various orthographies that have been used for writing the language show influences from Spanish, English and Americanist phonetic notation.

Notable Luiseño spelling correspondences
| IPA | Pablo Tac (1830s) | Sparkman (1900) | other recent | Modern |
|---|---|---|---|---|
| (Long vowel, e.g. /iː/) | ii | iꞏ | | ii |
| /tʃ/ | cꞌ | č | | ch |
| /ʃ/ | sꞌ | š | | sh |
| /q/ | qꞌ | q | | q |
| /ʔ/ | ꞌ | ʔ | | ꞌ |
| /x/ | j | x | | x |
| /ð/ | | δ | ð | th |
| /ŋ/ | nꞌ | ŋ | ñ | ng |
| /j/ | y | y | | y |
| /s̺/ | | | z | ꟍ |

== Morphology ==
Luiseño is an agglutinative language, where words use suffix complexes for a variety of purposes with several morphemes strung together.

== Sample texts ==
The Lord's Prayer (or the Our Father) in Luiseño, as recorded in The Sparkman Grammar of Luiseño.

Cham-naꞌ tuupanga aaukat cham-cha oi ohóꞌvanma.
Toshngo om chaami.
Lovíꞌi om hish mimchapun iváꞌ ooxng tuupanga axáninuk.
Ovi om chaamik cham-naachaxoni choun teméti.
Maaxaxan-up om chaamik hish aláxwichi chaam-loꞌxai ivianáninuk chaam-cha maaxaxma pomóomi chaami hish pom-loꞌxai aláxwichi.
Tuusho kamíiꞌi chaami chaam-loꞌxai hish hichakati.
Kwavcho om chaami.

Our-father / sky-in / being / we / you / believe / always.
Command / you / us.
Do / you / anything / whatever / here / earth-on / sky-in / as.
Give / you / us-to / our-food / every / day.
Pardon / you / us-to / anything / bad / our-doing / this as / we / pardon / them / us / anything / their-doing / bad.
Not / allow / us / our-doing / anything / wicked.
Care / you / us.

== See also ==
- Luiseño
- Acjachemen
- Mission Indians

== Sources ==
- Chung, Sandra (1974), "Remarks on Pablo Tac's La lingua degli Indi Luiseños", International Journal of American Linguistics, 40 (4): 292–307, doi:10.1086/465326, S2CID 143855734
- Clifford, Christian (2017), Meet Pablo Tac: Indian from the Far Shores of California, CreateSpace
- Hyde, Villiana Calac; Elliott, Eric (1994), Yumáyk Yumáyk: Long Ago, University of California Press
- Hyde, Villiana (1971), An Introduction to the Luiseño Language, Malki Museum Press
- Kroeber, A. L.; Grace, George William (1960), The Sparkman Grammar of Luiseño, Berkeley: UC Berkeley Press
- Tagliavini, Carlo (1926), La lingua degli Indi Luisenos, Bologna: Cooperativa Tipografica Azzoguidi
- Sparkman, Philip Stedman (1908). The culture of the Luiseño Indians. The University Press.
