= List of places in California (P) =

List of places in California - P

This list of current:

- cities
- towns, unincorporated communities
- counties, and other recognized places in the U.S. state of California.

Information on the number and names of counties in which the place lies, and its lower and upper ZIP Code bounds, if applicable are also included.

Name of place	Number of counties	Principal county	Lower zip code	Upper zip code
Pabco	1	Alameda County		
Pabrico	1	Alameda County	94587	
Pace Park	1	Santa Barbara County		
Pacer	1	Santa Barbara County		
Pachappa	1	Riverside County		
Pacheco	1	Contra Costa County	94553	
Pacific	1	El Dorado County		
Pacific	1	Los Angeles County	90806	
Pacifica	1	San Mateo County	94044	
Pacific Beach	1	San Diego County	92109	
Pacific Gardens	1	San Joaquin County	95204	
Pacific Grove	1	Monterey County	93950	
Pacific Grove Acres	1	Monterey County		
Pacific Manor	1	Humboldt County	95521	
Pacific Manor	1	San Mateo County	94044	
Pacific Palisades	1	Los Angeles County	90272	
Pacific Union College	1	Napa County		
Pacific Villas	1	San Joaquin County	95204	
Pacoima	1	Los Angeles County	91331	
Paddison Square	1	Los Angeles County	90652	
Paddon	1	Solano County	95688	
Paicines	1	San Benito County	95043	
Paige	1	Tulare County		
Paintersville	1	Sacramento County	95615	
Pajaro	1	Monterey County	95076	
Pala	1	San Diego County	92059	
Pala Indian Reservation	1	San Diego County	92059	
Pala Mesa	1	San Diego County		
Pala Mesa Village	1	San Diego County	92028	
Palermo	1	Butte County	95968	
Palisades del Rey	1	Los Angeles County	90292	
Pallett	1	Los Angeles County	93563	
Palm Beach	1	Santa Cruz County		
Palm City	1	Riverside County	92260	
Palm City	1	San Diego County		
Palmdale	1	Los Angeles County	93550	
Palmdale East	1	Los Angeles County	93550	
Palm Desert	1	Riverside County	92260	
Palm Desert Country	1	Riverside County		
Palmer Creek	1	Humboldt County	95540	
Palmetto	1	Plumas County		
Palm Grove	1	San Diego County		
Palms	1	Los Angeles County	90034	
Palm Springs	1	Riverside County	92262	92
Palm Wells	1	San Bernardino County	92256	
Palo Alto	1	Santa Clara County	94301	10
Palo Cedro	1	Shasta County	96073	
Paloma	1	Calaveras County	95252	
Palomares	1	Alameda County	94546	
Palomar Mountain	1	San Diego County	92060	
Palomar Park	1	San Mateo County	94062	
Paloro	1	Sutter County		
Palos Verdes Estates	1	Los Angeles County	90274	
Palos Verdes Peninsula	1	Los Angeles County	90274	
Palo Verde	1	Imperial County	92266	
Palo Vista	1	San Diego County	92083	
Panama	1	Kern County	93305	
Panamint	1	Inyo County	93545	
Panamint Springs	1	Inyo County	93545	
Panoche	1	San Benito County	95043	
Panoche Junction	1	Fresno County		
Panorama City	1	Los Angeles County	91402	
Panorama Heights	1	Orange County	92705	
Panorama Heights	1	San Bernardino County		
Panorama Heights	1	Tulare County	93260	
Paradise	1	Butte County	95969	
Paradise	1	Stanislaus County	95351	
Paradise Camp	1	Mono County	93514	
Paradise Cay	1	Marin County	94920	
Paradise Hills	1	San Diego County	92139	
Paradise Park, California	1	Santa Cruz County	95060	
Paradise Springs	1	Los Angeles County		
Paramount	1	Los Angeles County	90723	
Parcel Post	1	Alameda County	94710	
Parchers Camp	1	Inyo County	93514	
Parchester Village	1	Contra Costa County		
Pardee	1	Los Angeles County		
Paris	1	Los Angeles County		
Park	1	Alameda County	94702	
Park Central	1	Alameda County	94501	
Parker Dam	1	San Bernardino County	92267	
Parkfield	1	Monterey County	93451	
Park La Brea	1	Los Angeles County		
Parkmoor	1	Santa Clara County	95128	
Parksdale	1	Madera County		
Parkside	1	San Francisco County	94116	
Park Siding	1	Sonoma County	94952	
Park Village	1	Inyo County	92328	
Parkway	1	Sacramento County	95823	
Parkway Estates	1	Sacramento County	95826	
Parkway-South Sacramento	1	Sacramento County		
Parkwood	1	Madera County	93637	
Parlier	1	Fresno County	93648	
Parramore Springs	1	Lake County		
Pasadena	1	Los Angeles County	91101	18
Pasadena Junction	1	Los Angeles County		
Pasatiempo	1	Santa Cruz County	95062	
Paskenta	1	Tehama County	96074	
Paso Robles	1	San Luis Obispo County	93446	
Patata	1	Los Angeles County	90280	
Patricks Point	1	Humboldt County		
Patterson	1	Stanislaus County	95363	
Patton	1	San Bernardino County	92369	
Patton Village	1	Lassen County	96113	
Paulsell	1	Stanislaus County		
Pauma and Yuima Reservation	1	San Diego County	92061	
Pauma Indian Reservation	1	San Diego County	92061	
Pauma Valley	1	San Diego County	92061	
Paxton	1	Plumas County	95971	
Payne	1	Trinity County		
Paynes Creek	1	Tehama County	96075	
Paynesville	1	Alpine County	96120	
Payton	1	Butte County		
Peanut	1	Trinity County	96041	
Pearblossom	1	Los Angeles County	93553	
Peardale	1	Nevada County	95945	
Pearland	1	Los Angeles County	93550	
Pearson	1	San Joaquin County		
Pearson	1	Yuba County		
Pearsonville	1	Inyo County	93527	
Peavine	1	Sierra County		
Pebble Beach	1	Monterey County	93953	
Pechanga Indian Reservation	1	Riverside County	92390	
Pecwan	1	Humboldt County	95546	
Pedley	1	Riverside County	92509	
Pedro Valley	1	San Mateo County	94044	
Peltier	1	San Joaquin County		
Pencilwood	1	Sacramento County		
Pendleton North	1	San Diego County	92055	
Pendleton South	1	San Diego County	92055	
Peninsula Center	1	Los Angeles County	90274	
Peninsula Village	1	Plumas County	96137	
Penney	1	Trinity County		
Penngrove	1	Sonoma County	94951	
Penn Grove	1	Sonoma County		
Pennington	1	Sutter County	95953	
Penn Valley	1	Nevada County	95946	
Penoyar	1	Siskiyou County		
Penryn	1	Placer County	95663	
Pentland	1	Kern County		
Penvir	1	Monterey County		
Pepper Corner	1	Riverside County		
Pepperwood	1	Humboldt County	95569	
Pepperwood Grove	1	Lake County		
Peral	1	Tulare County		
Peralta Hills	1	Orange County		
Perkins	1	Sacramento County	95826	
Permanente	1	Santa Clara County	95014	
Perris	1	Riverside County	92570	
Perrott Creek	1	Humboldt County		
Perry	1	Los Angeles County	90603	
Perry	1	Santa Clara County	95037	
Pescadero	1	San Mateo County	94060	
Pesco	1	Santa Barbara County		
Petaluma	1	Sonoma County	94952	
Peters	1	San Joaquin County	95236	
Petrolia	1	Humboldt County	95558	
Phelan	1	San Bernardino County	92371	
Philbrick Mill	1	Mendocino County		
Phillips	1	El Dorado County		
Phillips Ranch	1	Los Angeles County	91766	
Phillips Ranch	1	Tulare County	91766	
Phillipsville	1	Humboldt County	95559	
Philo	1	Mendocino County	95466	
Phoenix Lake-Cedar Ridge	1	Tuolumne County		
Picacho	1	Imperial County		
Picayune Rancheria	1	Madera County		
Pico	1	Los Angeles County	90660	
Pico Heights	1	Los Angeles County	90006	
Pico Park	1	Los Angeles County		
Pico Rivera	1	Los Angeles County	90660	
Piedmont	1	Alameda County	94611	
Piedmont	1	Alameda County	94611	
Piedra	1	Fresno County	93649	
Pierce	1	Siskiyou County		
Pierce	1	Solano County		
Piercy	1	Mendocino County	95587	
Pierpont Bay	1	Ventura County		
Pieta	1	Mendocino County		
Pike	1	Sierra County	95960	
Pilot Hill	1	El Dorado County	95664	
Pine Bluff	1	Sacramento County	95630	
Pine Cove	1	Riverside County	92349	
Pinecrest	1	Nevada County		
Pinecrest	1	San Bernardino County		
Pinecrest	1	Tuolumne County	95364	
Pinecroft	1	Placer County		
Pinedale	1	Fresno County		
Pinedale	1	Fresno County	93650	
Pine Flat	1	Tulare County	93207	
Pine Grove	1	Amador County	95665	
Pine Grove	1	Lake County	95426	
Pine Grove	1	Mendocino County	95437	
Pine Grove	1	San Diego County		
Pine Grove	1	Shasta County	96079	
Pine Hills	1	Humboldt County	95501	
Pine Hills	1	San Diego County	92036	
Pinehurst	1	Fresno County	93641	
Pine Mountain Club	1	Kern County	93225	
Pineridge	1	Fresno County	93602	
Pine Valley	1	San Diego County	91962	
Pine Wood	1	Riverside County		
Pinewood	1	Tulare County		
Pinezanita	1	San Bernardino County		
Pinnacle	1	San Bernardino County		
Pinnacles	1	San Benito County	95043	
Pinnacles National Park	2	Monterey County; San Benito County	95043	
Pino Grande	1	El Dorado County		
Pinole	1	Contra Costa County	94564	
Pinoleville Rancheria	1	Mendocino County		
Piñon Hills	1	San Bernardino County	92372	
Pinto Wye	1	Riverside County		
Pinyon Crest	1	Riverside County		
Pinyon Pines	1	Riverside County	92561	
Pioneer	1	Amador County	95666	
Pioneer	1	Los Angeles County		
Pioneer	1	Siskiyou County		
Pioneer Point	1	San Bernardino County	93562	
Pioneertown	1	San Bernardino County	92268	
Piru	1	Ventura County	93040	
Pisgah	1	San Bernardino County		
Pismo	1	San Luis Obispo County		
Pismo Beach	1	San Luis Obispo County	93449	
Pitco	1	Kings County		
Pit River	1	Lassen County		
Pit River Tribal Trust Lands	1	Shasta County		
Pittsburg	1	Contra Costa County	94565	
Pittsburg East Census Area	1	Contra Costa County		
Pittsburg West	1	Contra Costa County		
Pittville	2	Lassen County; Shasta County	96056	
Pixley	1	Tulare County	93256	
Pizona	1	Mono County		
Placentia	1	Orange County	92670	
Placerville	1	El Dorado County	95667	
Plainfield	1	Yolo County		
Plainsburg	1	Merced County	95340	
Plainview	1	Tulare County	93267	
Planada	1	Merced County	95365	
Planehaven	1	Sacramento County	95652	
Plano	1	Tulare County	93257	
Plantation	1	Sonoma County	95421	
Plaskett	1	Monterey County		
Plaster City	1	Imperial County	92269	
Platina	1	Shasta County	96076	
Playa	1	Orange County	92652	
Playa Del Rey	1	Los Angeles County	90293	
Playa Vista	1	Los Angeles County	90094	
Playmor	1	San Diego County	92011	
Plaza	1	Los Angeles County	91101	
Plaza	1	Orange County	92666	
Plaza	1	Santa Clara County	94086	
Plaza Center	1	San Bernardino County	91762	
Pleasant Grove	1	Sutter County	95668	
Pleasant Hill	1	Contra Costa County	94523	
Pleasant Hill	1	Humboldt County	95521	
Pleasant Hills	1	Contra Costa County	94523	
Pleasanton	1	Alameda County	94566	
Pleasant Ranchos	1	Orange County		
Pleasant Valley	1	Butte County		
Pleasant Valley	1	El Dorado County	95667	
Pleasant View	1	Tulare County		
Pleyto	1	Monterey County		
Plumas Eureka	1	Plumas County		
Plumbago	1	Sierra County		
Plymouth	1	Amador County	95669	
Poinsettia Tract	1	Contra Costa County	94565	
Point Arena	1	Mendocino County	95468	
Point Arena Air Force Station	1	Mendocino County	95468	
Point Arguello	1	Santa Barbara County		
Point Dume	1	Los Angeles County	90265	
Point Firmin	1	Los Angeles County	90731	
Point Loma	1	San Diego County	92106	
Point McCloud	1	Shasta County		
Point Mugu	1	Ventura County	93042	
Point Mugu Base	1	Ventura County	93042	
Point Mugu Naval Air Station	1	Ventura County	93042	
Point Pleasant	1	Sacramento County	95624	
Point Reyes Station	1	Marin County	94956	
Point Richmond	1	Contra Costa County	94807	
Points	1	Los Angeles County		
Poison Lake	1	Lassen County		
Poker Flat	1	Sierra County		
Polaris	1	Nevada County		
Pole Garden	1	Lake County		
Polk	1	Sacramento County		
Polk Springs	1	Tehama County		
Pollard Flat	1	Shasta County		
Pollock	1	Sacramento County		
Pollock	1	Shasta County		
Pollock Pines	1	El Dorado County	95726	
Pomins	1	El Dorado County		
Pomo	1	Mendocino County		
Pomona	1	Los Angeles County	91766	69
Ponca	1	Tulare County		
Pond	1	Kern County	93280	
Pondosa	1	Siskiyou County	96057	
Ponto	1	San Diego County		
Pope	1	San Joaquin County		
Pope Valley	1	Napa County	94567	
Poplar	1	Tulare County	93257	
Poplar-Cotton Center	1	Tulare County		
Porphyry	1	Riverside County		
Portal Inn	1	Shasta County		
Port Chicago	1	Contra Costa County	94565	
Port Costa	1	Contra Costa County	94569	
Porter Ranch	1	Los Angeles County	91326	
Porterville	1	Tulare County	93257	
Porterville Junction	1	Tulare County	93257	
Porterville Northwest	1	Tulare County	93257	
Porterville West	1	Tulare County	93257	
Port Hueneme	1	Ventura County	93041	
Port Kenyon	1	Humboldt County	95536	
Port of Redwood City	1	San Mateo County		
Portola	1	Plumas County	96122	
Portola Hills	1	Orange County	92679	
Portola Terrace	1	San Mateo County	94025	
Portola Valley	1	San Mateo County	94028	
Port San Luis	1	San Luis Obispo County	93424	
Portuguese Bend	1	Los Angeles County	90274	
Posey	1	Tulare County	93260	
Poso Park	1	Tulare County	93260	
Post	1	Santa Barbara County		
Posts	1	Monterey County	93920	
Potrero	1	San Diego County	91963	
Potrero	1	San Francisco County		
Potrero District	1	San Francisco County		
Potter Valley	1	Mendocino County	95469	
Potwisha	1	Tulare County		
Poverty Hill	1	Sierra County		
Poway	1	San Diego County	92064	
Powellton	1	Butte County		
Pozo	1	San Luis Obispo County	93453	
Prado Dam	1	Riverside County		
Prairie City	1	Sacramento County		
Prather	1	Fresno County	93651	
Prattco	1	Monterey County	93941	
Pratton	1	Fresno County		
Prattville	1	Plumas County	95923	
Prenda	1	Riverside County		
Presidio	1	San Francisco County	94129	
Presidio of Monterey	1	Monterey County	93944	
Presidio of San Francisco	1	San Francisco County	94129	
Presswood	1	Mendocino County		
Preston	1	Sonoma County		
Preston Heights	1	Humboldt County	95521	
Preuss	1	Los Angeles County	90035	
Priest	1	Tuolumne County		
Priest Valley	1	Monterey County	93210	
Prima Vista	1	Stanislaus County		
Princeton	1	Colusa County	95970	
Princeton	1	San Mateo County	94018	
Princeton-by-the-Sea	1	San Mateo County	94019	
Pritchard	1	Merced County		
Proberta	1	Tehama County	96078	
Progress	1	Sutter County		
Project City	1	Shasta County	96079	
Prosser Lakeview Estates	1	Nevada County	95734	
Prunedale	1	Monterey County	93907	
Puente Junction	1	Los Angeles County	91744	
Puerto	1	Stanislaus County		
Pulga	1	Butte County	95965	
Pumpkin Center	1	Kern County	93383	
Punta	1	Ventura County		
Pushawalla Palms	1	Riverside County		
