= Pope (disambiguation) =

The pope is the head of the Catholic Church and sovereign of the State of the Vatican City. Pope or The Pope may refer specifically to:

- Pope Leo XIV, the current Pope
- Pope Tawadros II of Alexandria, the current Coptic Pope of Alexandria
- Pope and Patriarch Theodore II of Alexandria, the current Greek Orthodox Pope of Alexandria

Any specific individual of the:

- List of popes
  - List of Coptic Orthodox Popes of Alexandria
  - List of Greek Orthodox Popes and Patriarchs of Alexandria

Pope or The Pope may also refer to:

== Religious offices ==
- Pope (title)
- Pope of the Coptic Orthodox Church, the Primate of the Coptic Orthodox Church of Alexandria
- Pope and Patriarch of Alexandria and All Africa, the leader of the Chalcedonian Greek Orthodox Church of Alexandria
- Palmarian Pope, the leader of the Palmarian Catholic Church
- Pope of Legio Maria, the leader of the Legio Maria
- Caodaiist Pope, the leader of the Cao Dai religion of Vietnam

== People ==
- Pope (name)
- Popé, more commonly known as Po'pay, the leader of the Pueblo republic

== Places ==
=== United States ===
- Pope, Alabama
- Pope County, Arkansas
- Pope, California (disambiguation)
  - Pope Valley, California
- Pope County, Illinois
- Pope Township, Fayette County, Illinois
- Pope, Kentucky
- Pope County, Minnesota
- Pope, Mississippi
- Pope Air Force Base, North Carolina

=== Other places ===
- Pope (Kakanj), a village in the municipality of Kakanj, Bosnia and Herzegovina
- Pope Parish, Ventspils municipality, Latvia

== Animals ==
- Ruffe, a freshwater fish known as "pope"
- Pope (horse), a racehorse

== Arts, entertainment, and media ==
=== Cards ===
- The Pope or The Hierophant in Tarot cards
- Pope Joan (card game)

=== Other uses in arts, entertainment, and media ===
- "Pope", a Prince song from Glam Slam Ulysses
- Le Pape (the Pope), by Victor Hugo
- The Pope, working title of 2019 film The Two Popes

== Brands and enterprises ==
- Pope Manufacturing Company, of bicycles and vehicles
- Pope Products, Australian manufacturer of washing machines, etc.
- Pope-Toledo, former U. S. car-make

== Other uses ==
- Da Pope (Elijah Burke, born 1981), American wrestler
- Popes (gang), Chicago, US
- POPE, the phospholipid 1-Palmitoyl-2-oleoyl-sn-glycero-3-phosphoethanolamine
- USS Pope, three US Navy ships

== See also ==
- Antipope
- Black Pope (disambiguation)
- Justice Pope (disambiguation)
