= Pink Floyd in Venice: A Concert for Europe =

Live concert in 1989

- Concert by Pink Floyd
- Venue: San Marco basin, Venice, Italy
- Tour: A Momentary Lapse of Reason
- Date: 15 July 1989
- Duration: 90 min
- No. of shows: 1
- Attendance: 200,000
- Box office: free concert

Pink Floyd in Venice: A Concert for Europe was a 1989 live performance by the English rock band Pink Floyd during their A Momentary Lapse of Reason Tour, staged on a floating barge on the Grand Canal in Venice, Italy.

Counted among the most extraordinary rock concerts ever held in Italy, it took place on 15 July 1989 on the traditional Redeemer festival (festa del Redentore) at the presence of some 200,000 spectators positioned on the banks and boats of the St. Mark's basin. It was broadcast by RAI worldwide with an audience of about 100 million viewers.

== History ==
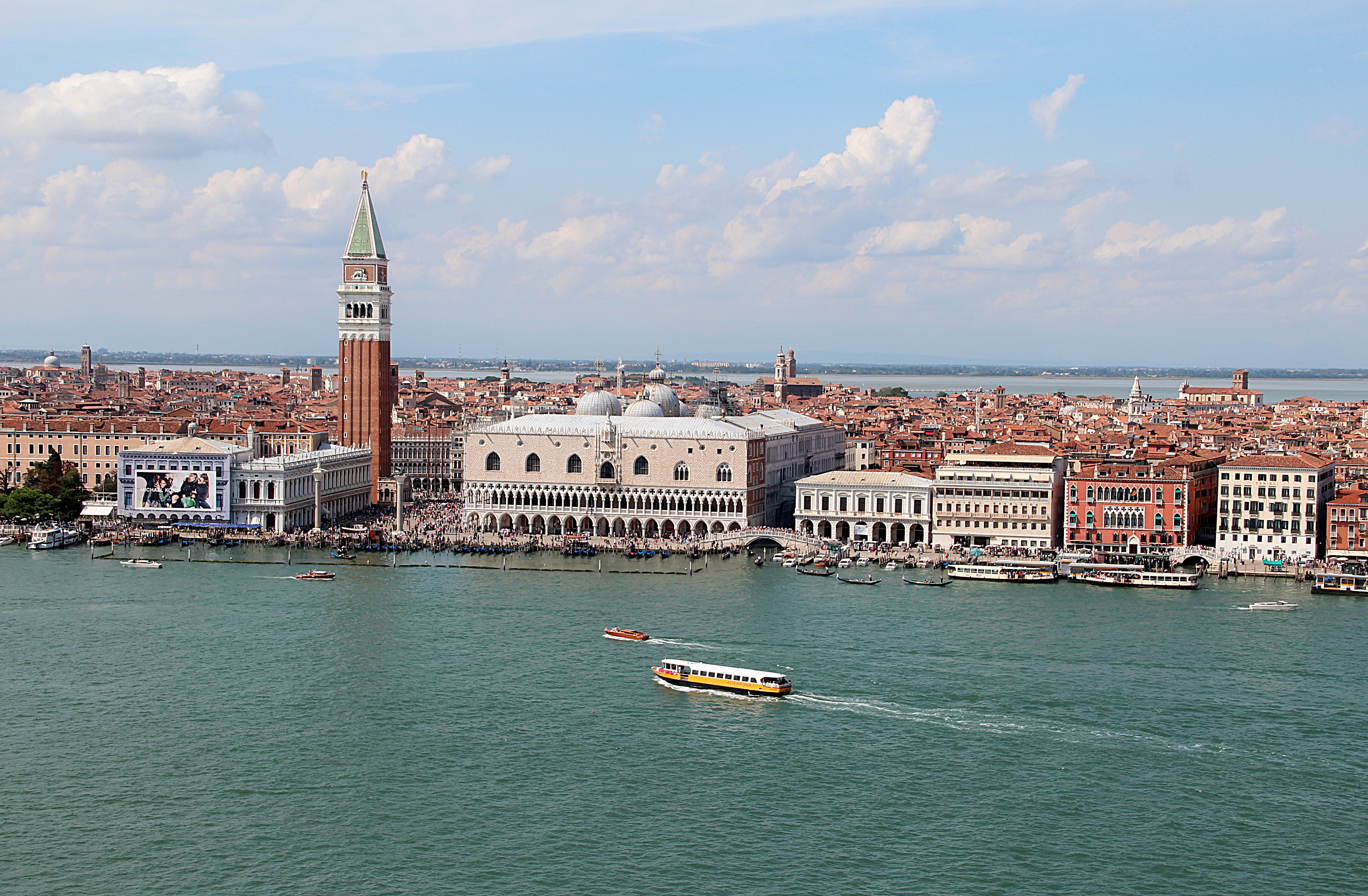
San Marco basin, Venice

After the concerts at Arena of Verona, Monza, Livorno, and Cava de' Tirreni in May 1989, the Venetian producer Francesco 'Fran' Tomasi proposed that Pink Floyd close their tour in Italy with a free concert in his city on the night of 15 July 1989, during the traditional festa del Redentore.

Initially it was planned to set up the stage, twenty-four metres high, on the extreme tip of the island of Giudecca, but due to space availability issue it was decided to use some large rafts moored in the middle of San Marco basin, in front of the Doge's Palace.

The announcement of the event was spread in the beginning of April 1989, triggering a bitter polemical debate in the following three months, particularly concerning the city's decorum and the fear that the excessive volume of the music could damage its artistic heritage. The Superintendency of Cultural Heritage therefore set a limit of only 60 decibels so as not to damage the Byzantine mosaics of St. Mark's basilica (although peaks of up to 92 decibels were recorded during the concert); they also prohibited the installation of temporary chemical toilets for aesthetic reasons.

Polemics also hit the political scene, where there were different factions: on the one hand, there were supporters of the initiative such as the Venetian deputy prime minister Gianni De Michelis (who wanted to nominate Venice as the venue for Expo 2000) and the Municipal councillor for culture Nereo Laroni; and on the other hand, opponents such as exponents of the Christian Democracy party. The municipal administration remained undecided for a long time, but in the end the deputy mayor Cesare De Piccoli signed the authorization for the concert (the mayor Antonio Casellati refused in fact to do it), just one hour before the beginning of the concert and only for reasons of public order, since the city had been invaded by a huge audience that had arrived since the previous evening thanks to special trains and charter flights from all over Europe.

The cost of the event was financed with one billion Italian lire by RAI, who broadcast the concert worldwide, including the Soviet Union (on a delayed basis) and simultaneously in the two Germanies; the rest of the expenses (several hundred millions lire) were covered by Pink Floyd themselves. It is estimated that worldwide, the concert was watched by 100 million spectators, 27 million of them in the United States (where the event was broadcast on cable for the price of ten dollars). In Italy, the concert was seen by over 3.5 million viewers, with an audience share of 30%.

For technical reasons, due to the TV live broadcasting requirements, the availability of satellites for world-wide viewing, and commercial advertising, the concert was limited to only 90 minutes, with some songs cut from the original setlist or eliminated altogether: only 14 songs were played instead of the 23 scheduled on the original tour.

The Venice show was great fun, but it was very tense and nerve-wracking. We had a specific length of show to do; the satellite broadcasting meant we had to get it absolutely precise. We had the list of songs, and we'd shortened them, which we'd never done before. I had a big clock with a red digital read-out on the floor in front of me, and had the start time of each number on a piece of paper. If we were coming near the start time of the next number, I just had to wrap up the one we were on. We had a really good time, but the city authorities who had agreed to provide the services of security, toilets, food, completely reneged on everything they were supposed to do, and then tried to blame all the subsequent problems on us. Lots of twaddle was written about it, even by some nice respectable journalists from The Guardian - stuff about our music disturbing the buildings; complete ****ing absolute twaddle.

— David Gilmour

The closing of the concert was marked by the traditional large fireworks show of the Redeemer festival, that registered an intensity of 107 decibels, thus exceeding the limits allowed for the concert.

After the concert, the polemics increased due to the large amount of rubbish (around 300 tonnes of rubbish and 500 cubic metres of cans and empty bottles) left on the ground by the audience: the local municipal company for urban hygiene (AMIU) decided, however, to start collecting the rubbish only two days later, on the afternoon of the following Monday, while later the Italian Army also had asked to intervene in support. Another controversy concerned the alleged vandalism around the city, but the only damage recorded was a marker on a column of the Doge's Palace (compensated by the organisation with few hundred euro), and the smashing of a bar window in protest at the excessive rise in food prices (bottled water had been put on sale for 10.000 lire). Due the incessant polemics, which even led to parliamentary questioning, the red-green municipal council was forced to resign on 24 July, although shortly afterwards the municipal council re-elected a new council, largely identical to the previous one and renamed by the local press as the 'photocopy council'.

== Band ==
=== Pink Floyd ===
- David Gilmour – lead vocals, lead guitars, console steel guitar on "The Great Gig In The Sky"
- Nick Mason – drums, percussion
- Richard Wright – keyboards, backing vocals, harmony vocals

=== Additional musicians ===
- Jon Carin – keyboards, sound effects, vocals, additional percussion
- Scott Page – saxophones, oboe, additional guitars
- Guy Pratt – bass guitar, vocals
- Tim Renwick – guitars, backing vocals
- Gary Wallis – percussion, additional keyboards
- Rachel Fury – backing vocals
- Durga McBroom – backing vocals
- Lorelei McBroom – backing vocals

== Setlist ==
1. "Shine On You Crazy Diamond, Part I"
2. "Learning to Fly"
3. "Yet Another Movie"
4. "Round and Around"
5. "Sorrow" (shortened outro)
6. "The Dogs of War"
7. "On the Turning Away"
8. "Time"
9. "The Great Gig in the Sky"
10. "Wish You Were Here"
11. "Money" (shortened)
12. "Another Brick in the Wall, Part 2"
13. "Comfortably Numb"
14. "Run Like Hell"

== Legacy ==
The Venetian reggae band Pitura Freska dedicated the song Pin Floi, fourth track of 1991 album 'Na Bruta Banda ("An Ugly Gang"). A milestone in Venitian dialect songs, the song tells the personal experience of singer Sir Oliver Skardy who was unable to reach the concert area due to the great confusion and the local public transport strike called on the day of the concert.

In 2014, in the former church of St. Mary in the Port of Venice, the exhibition The Night of Wonders. Venezia 15 luglio 1989-2014 was set up to celebrate the 25th anniversary of the concert.

== Bibliography ==
- Floydseum, ed. (2014). The night of wonders. Pink Floyd a Venezia. 15 luglio 1989. Luci, suoni e memorie. Coffee Colours. ISBN 978-88-903816-4-5.
- Cottino, Linda; et al. (19 May 2016). Veneto. EDT. ISBN 978-88-592-3246-9.
- Distefano, Giovanni; Paladini, Giannantonio (1997). Storia di Venezia. Dalla monarchia alla repubblica (in Italian). Vol. 3. Supernova-Biesse. ISBN 9788886870153.
- Gastaldi, Tommaso (2006). Lo show del secolo: i Pink Floyd a Venezia. Milano: Free Media.
- Guaitamacchi, Ezio (2010). 1000 concerti che ci hanno cambiato la vita. Milano: Rizzoli. ISBN 978-88-17-04222-2.
- Marini, Sara (July–August 2019). "Effimero veneziano: lo stesso spazio, una notte, molte cornici (Pink Floyd, Venezia 15 luglio 1989)". Engramma. No. 167.

== Filmography ==
- Pink Floyd, "A Concert For Europe" - Pink Floyd à Venezia - Live in Venice, July 15, 1989.
