= Funner, California =

Funner, California Wáșxa (Luiseño)
- Unincorporated community / promotional placename
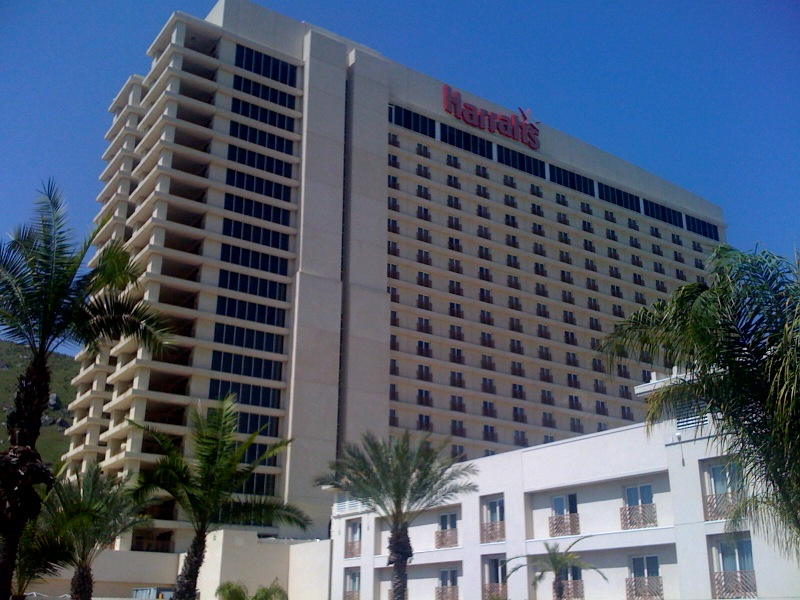
- Harrah’s Resort Southern California in Funner
- Nickname: Funner
- Motto: “Where Fun Happens”
- Country: United States
- State: California
- County: San Diego
- Reservation: Rincon Band of Luiseño Indians
- Promotional re-designation: August 1, 2016
- ZIP Code: 92082 (shared with Valley Center)
- Area code: 442/760

Funner, California (stylized “FUNNER”) is a promotional place name adopted by the Rincon Band of Luiseño Indians for the area surrounding the Harrah’s Resort Southern California, located in the northeastern part of San Diego County, California, within the broader unincorporated community of Valley Center, California. The name is not recognized as an incorporated municipality, but appears in resort branding, signage and promotional materials.

== History ==
=== Indigenous and pre-reservation era ===
The region now containing Funner lies within the ancestral territory of the Luiseño people in the vicinity of the ancestral village of Wáșxa. The present‐day Rincon Band of Luiseño Indians, one of the federally recognized Luiseño tribes, is situated on the Rincon Reservation, which was established in 1875. Their land governance, cultural heritage and economic development activities extend from that reservation.

=== Reservation-era and development ===
The Rincon Band’s reservation is located in northeastern San Diego County along the San Luis Rey River and covers several thousand acres. The tribe established large-scale commercial enterprises in the late 20th and early 21st centuries, including the resort and casino now operated in the area.

=== Re-designation as “Funner” ===
On August 1, 2016, the tribe unanimously adopted the name “Funner, California” for the area around the resort complex (the change was publicly unveiled in 2017). The adopted branding emphasizes entertainment, hospitality and tourism, with the resort’s management referencing the “Funner state of mind” slogan.

== Geography ==
Funner lies within the unincorporated community of Valley Center and is part of San Diego County. The area is accessed by major regional routes such as State Route 76 and State Route 78 via Valley Center Road. The topography is valley and foothill terrain typical of the inland northern section of the county.

== Climate ==
According to the Köppen climate classification system, Funner has a warm-summer Mediterranean climate, abbreviated "Csa" on climate maps. Temperatures range from 100+ degrees Fahrenheit to 32 degrees and below.

== Governance ==
Funner is not an incorporated jurisdiction; it has no municipal government separate from San Diego County or the Valley Center community. Authority over the underlying land (via tribal trust or reservation status) lies with the Rincon Band of Luiseño Indians, which governs through its Tribal Council and provides services to the reservation and surrounding area.

== Economy ==
Economic activity in Funner is dominated by hospitality, gaming and resort enterprise. The Harrah’s Resort complex, owned by the tribe and operated in partnership with a commercial operator, serves as the primary driver of employment and regional visitor traffic.

== Culture and identity ==
The branding of Funner emphasises leisure, entertainment and the novelty of the place-name. Celebrity “mayors” have been appointed for promotional purposes, and the resort’s marketing plays a central role in shaping the public identity of Funner.

== Transportation ==
Road access is the principal means of reaching Funner, with private vehicle traffic dominant. Public transit linkages are limited.

== Celebrity spokespersons ==
The Rincon tribe and Harrah's management have appointed a "mayor of Funner", who is a notable celebrity, to promote the resort. In their role, they provide pre-recorded messages on a hotline for hotel guests and appear in television and print advertising. The "term" is two years.

On May 18, 2017, David Hasselhoff was introduced its first official mayor.

On May 15, 2019, Rob Riggle was announced as its second mayor.

On May 16, 2022, Jane Lynch was announced as its third mayor.

On May 13, 2024, Martin Short began serving as its fourth mayor.

== See also ==
- Valley Center, California
- Rincon Band of Luiseño Indians
- Luiseño people
