= California State Route 76 =

Highway in California

State Route 76
- SR 76 highlighted in red

Route information
- Maintained by Caltrans
- Length: 52.319 mi (84.199 km)
- Existed: 1964–present

Major junctions
- West end: I-5 in Oceanside
- I-15 near Pala
- East end: SR 79 near Lake Henshaw

Location
- Country: United States
- State: California
- Counties: San Diego

Highway system
- State highways in California; Interstate; US; State; Scenic; History; Pre‑1964; Unconstructed; Deleted; Freeways
← SR 75	→ SR 77

State Route 76 (SR 76) is a state highway 52.63 miles (84.70 km) long in the U.S. state of California. It is a much used east–west route in the North County region of San Diego County that begins in Oceanside near Interstate 5 (I-5) and continues east. The highway is a major route through the region, passing through the community of Bonsall and providing access to Fallbrook. East of the junction with I-15, SR 76 goes through Pala and Pauma Valley before terminating at SR 79.

A route along the corridor has existed since the early 20th century, as has the bridge over the San Luis Rey River near Bonsall. The route was added to the state highway system in 1933, and was officially designated by the California State Legislature as SR 76 in the 1964 state highway renumbering. The section of the highway through Oceanside and Bonsall is mostly a four-lane expressway; east of I-15, the roadway is mostly a two-lane highway. Originally, the entire highway was two lanes wide; west of Bonsall, the route was widened in stages, after decades of funding shortages, planning, and litigation. The California Department of Transportation (Caltrans) maintained plans to expand the entire length of the highway west of I-15 to an expressway, and as of May 2017, construction between Bonsall and I-15 was complete.

== Route description ==
Route 76 is defined in section 376 of the California Streets and Highways Code, and that the highway is "from Route 5 near Oceanside to Route 79 near Lake Henshaw".

The roadway carrying the SR 76 designation begins at County Route S21 (CR S21) in Oceanside, although Caltrans does not consider the road west of I-5 to be part of the route, and it is not in the legal definition. There is soon an interchange with I-5, after which SR 76 becomes a four-lane expressway known as the San Luis Rey Mission Expressway. From I-5 to Mission Avenue, the highway parallels the San Luis Rey River until it passes by the Oceanside Municipal Airport. During this stretch, SR 76 intersects Loretta Street, Canyon Drive, Benet Road, Airport Road, and Foussat Road. There are two overpasses: one over Mission Avenue, and one over El Camino Real, before the road intersects Douglas Drive, the main road to the San Luis Rey gate of Camp Pendleton. After an intersection with Rancho Del Oro Road, SR 76 passes over Mission Avenue again before intersecting with Old Grove Road, Frazee Road, a turnoff into the Towne Center North shopping center, and College Boulevard.

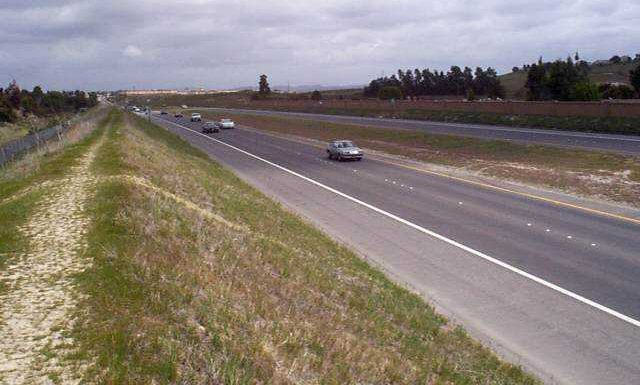
SR 76 in Oceanside

As it enters rural Oceanside, SR 76 intersects with North Santa Fe Avenue (CR S14), Guajome Lake Road (near Guajome County Park), and Melrose Drive. SR 76 intersects the southern segment of CR S13, known as East Vista Way, and passes over the San Luis Rey River on roughly parallel bridges before an intersection at North River Road. The highway passes through Bonsall, intersecting Via Montellano, Olive Hill Road, and Throughbred Lane. SR 76 then meets the northern segment of CR S13, known as South Mission Road, while heading north into Fallbrook; SR 76 is the primary road connecting the two portions of CR S13. Here, SR 76 becomes known as Pala Road. It intersects Via Monserate and Gird Road south of Fallbrook before crossing the former routing of US 395 and the current routing of I-15 in the community of Pala Mesa Village.

SR 76 then goes through Pala and the Pala Indian Reservation, providing access to the Pala Casino and intersecting CR S16, the turnoff to the Pala Mission and Temecula. Continuing to parallel the San Luis Rey River, SR 76 passes by the Wilderness Gardens County Park before entering the community of Pauma Valley and meeting the southern terminus of CR S7 (Nate Harrison Grade), a dirt road leading into Palomar Mountain State Park. SR 76 intersects the southern leg of CR S6 (Valley Center Road), leading to Valley Center and Escondido. East of the small Yuima Indian Reservation, it then encounters the northern leg of CR S6, the southern approach to the Palomar Observatory and Palomar Mountain State Park, as well as the community of La Jolla Amago. It then briefly passes through the Cleveland National Forest and meets the eastern terminus of CR S7, the eastern approach to Palomar Mountain. SR 76 then passes along the shores of Lake Henshaw before terminating at the intersection with SR 79 at Morettis Junction, southeast of Lake Henshaw.

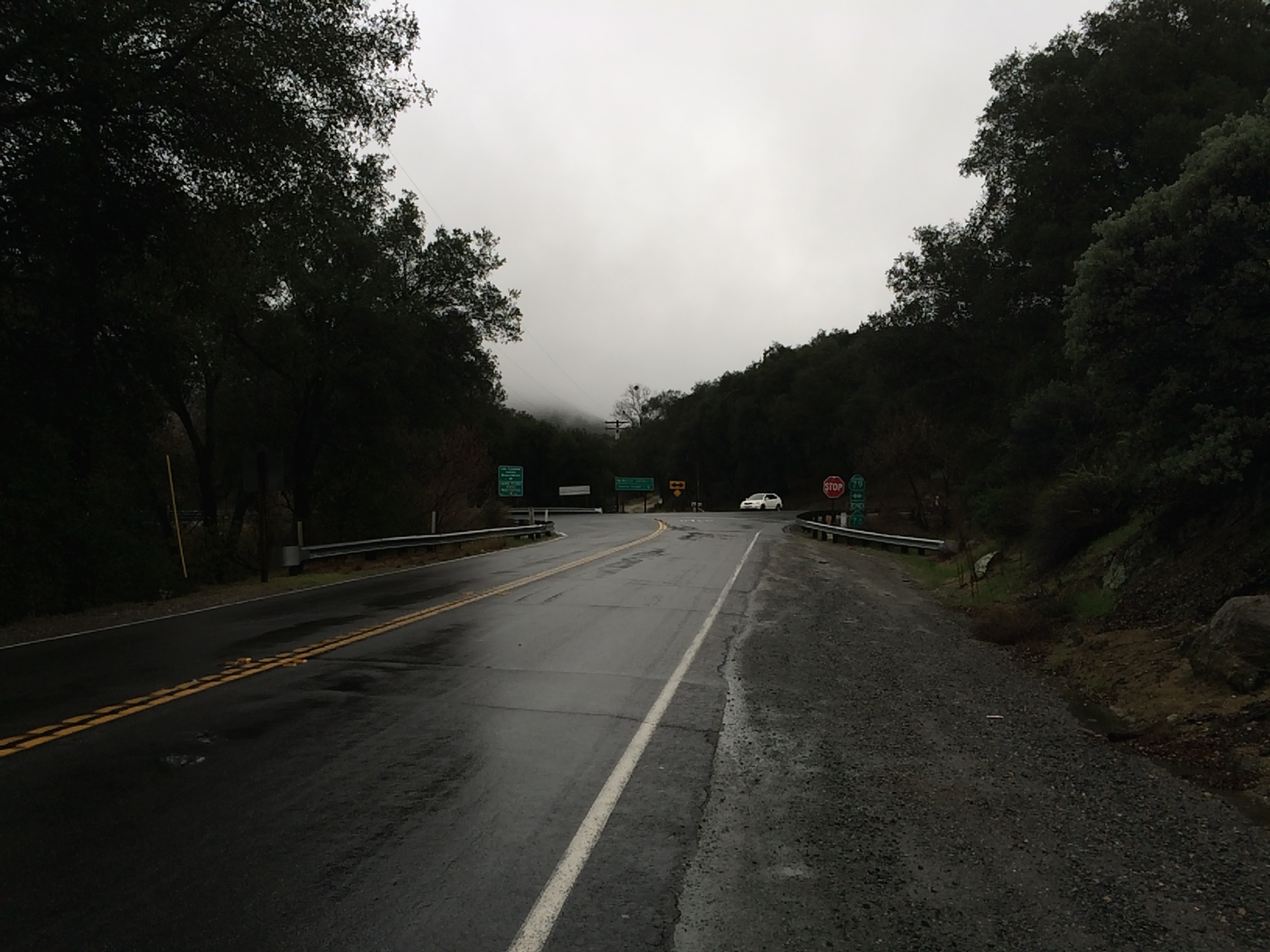
SR 76 at the eastern terminus with SR 79

From I-5 to I-15, SR 76 is part of the California Freeway and Expressway System, and west of Bonsall is part of the National Highway System, a network of highways that are considered essential to the country's economy, defense, and mobility by the Federal Highway Administration. SR 76 is legally eligible to be included in the State Scenic Highway System, but it is not officially designated as a scenic highway by the California Department of Transportation. The part of the highway from the western terminus to Douglas Drive is also named for Tony Zeppetella, an Oceanside police officer killed while on duty performing a traffic stop in 2003. In 2018, SR 76 had an annual average daily traffic (AADT) of 1,950 between East Palomar Road and the eastern terminus at SR 79, and 55,000 between I-5 and Loretta Street in Oceanside, the latter of which was the highest AADT for the highway.

== History ==
The road through the San Luis Rey Valley was planned as early as 1889 and was constructed during the early 20th century. It was added to the state highway system in 1933, while the condition of the highway continued to improve. The San Luis Rey Mission Expressway was eventually constructed during the 1990s and 2000s, and efforts to extend the expressway east to I-15 were completed during the 2010s.

=== Original road ===
Plans by the City of Oceanside for a road east through the San Luis Rey Valley to Fallbrook date from June 1889, and included a bridge over the San Luis Rey River. Construction on the bridge over the river at Bonsall had commenced by October 1906, and the bridge was to be 250 feet (76 m) long. In November, the road to the bridge was under construction; originally, the bridge was to serve the road from Escondido to Temecula. A survey was commissioned in 1908 to replace the road along the south bank of the river with one along the north bank to Pala, as the former was sandy and difficult for travel. State funding issues for the Pala road by May 1912 that prevented completion, though the planned road had been surveyed from Bonsall, where it met with the Escondido road, to Oceanside.

Flooding in January 1916 resulted in the closing of the pre-existing road between Bonsall and Pala; part of it reopened in October. Nevertheless, six miles (9.7 km) of the road between Pauma Valley and Pala did not reopen for two years. Meanwhile, a road from Pala to Warner Springs neared completion in March 1918, though a bridge would be necessary for the road to be usable during the winter months. By mid-1921, plans were underway to pave Mission Avenue through the Oceanside city limits. The first three miles (4.8 km) east from Oceanside were paved by November 1924. The Bonsall Bridge over the San Luis Rey River was completed in 1925, and opened in 1926 as the county's largest bridge at the time; it served as part of the road from San Diego to Elsinore. The Pala road was constructed by 1930, although it was not paved east of Pala.

The road that extended from US 101 in Oceanside all the way to SR 79 near Lake Henshaw was originally added to the state highway system in 1933, but was not designated as legislative Route 195 until 1935. By 1936, US 395 was signed along what would become SR 76 through Bonsall, as part of the route between Elsinore and San Diego. In 1943, work began on widening the approaches to the Bonsall bridge. US 395 had been shifted east away from Bonsall by 1949. SR 76 was signed by 1954. During the 1964 state highway renumbering, Route 195 was legally redesignated as State Route 76; at that time, the legal definition was updated to reflect the new designation of I-5, replacing US 101.

=== Delays and postponement ===
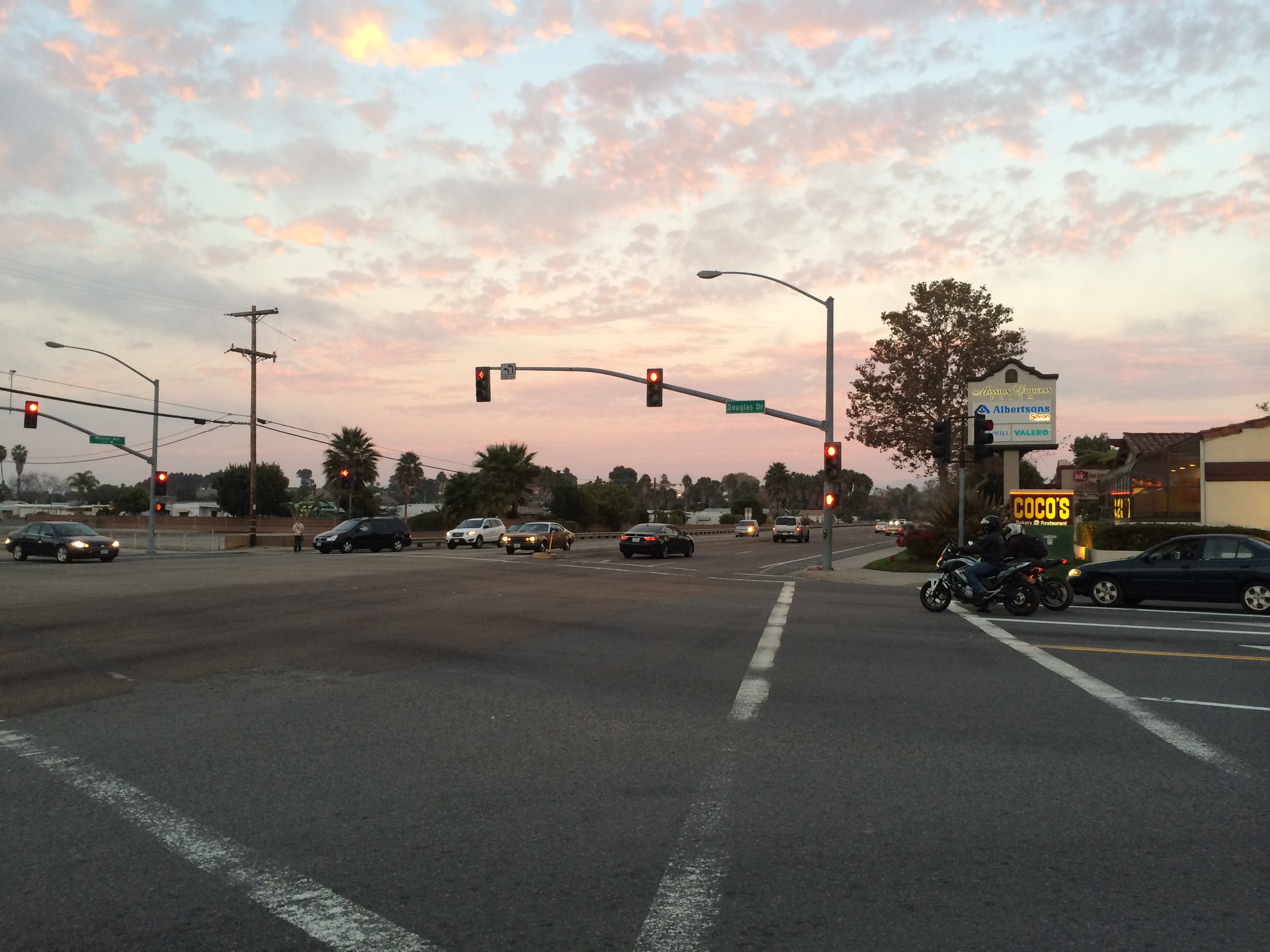
The old routing of SR 76, Mission Avenue, at the Douglas Drive intersection

The original idea for constructing a replacement for Mission Avenue dates from 1950. By 1961, there were plans to make SR 76 a freeway from Oceanside to Fallbrook Road, and an expressway from there to US 395. The following year, the new Highway 76 Association formed a committee to promote the upgrade of the road into Pauma Valley. In 1963, more specific plans were proposed by the Highway Development Association initiative, including making the portions from Foussat Road and the Mission San Luis Rey de Francia and from Vista Way to Mission Road an expressway, and widening the part of the highway in Oceanside. In 1964, the state allocated funds for the widening of SR 76 to four lanes in Oceanside, and in October 1965, the first portion of the widening from Carey Road to Frontier Drive entered the bidding phase. The next part of the widening entered the bidding phase in December 1968, and extended from Frontier Drive to near the Mission.

Caltrans engineer Jacob Dekema announced in April 1969 that construction on SR 76 and the nearby SR 78 between I-5 and US 395 would be delayed until work on I-5 and US 395 was underway, or at least until 1976. Nevertheless, a widening project was commissioned in 1970 between Pauma Reservation Road and Cole Grade Road, well east of US 395. The next year, construction began on a new interchange between the future routing of SR 76 and I-5, near Oceanside Harbor and Camp Del Mar in Camp Pendleton. The expansion of SR 76 appeared on the Comprehensive Planning Organization (CPO) regional government plan in late 1974. At that time, there was an effort by the City of Oceanside to have SR 76 included as a scenic highway, but SR 76 has not been included in the system. The Chamber of Commerce decided to continue efforts to have SR 76 expanded at the end of 1974.

In January 1975, Caltrans presented plans to realign SR 76 away from Mission Avenue and move it to the south side of the San Luis Rey River from I-5 to Frontier Drive. One member of the Tri-Cities Taxpayers' League suggested that the freeway be built on the northern side of the river, and follow the river all the way east to I-15. Following concerns that the project would be cancelled due to lack of state funding, the California Highway Commission (CHC) stated that the proposal was still being considered. The City of Oceanside raised concerns about the congestion on Mission Avenue, as well as the realignment being a part of the city master plan. After this, at the start of the next year, the CHC decided to keep the proposal, though there were concerns that construction would be delayed due to the state financial crisis. Caltrans stated a few months later that SR 76 would be delayed because of the funding issues and the relatively low levels of traffic that would not support building a freeway. Following this, State Senator John Stull alleged that Caltrans head Adriana Gianturco was purposefully delaying the project by delaying the release of the environmental impact report. A petition drive began soon after, supported by many North County leaders, with the exception of Bonsall due to concerns about a full freeway running through the community.

From 1974 to 1977, Oceanside police kept track of over 1,000 accidents that occurred along SR 76. A citizen action group known as Concerned Citizens for Highway 76 formed soon after. Caltrans began holding hearings again in 1979, proposing the building of an expressway as opposed to a freeway or to widening Mission Avenue. At one hearing, local officials criticized the delay, while others criticized the routing, the decision to build an expressway instead of a freeway, and building a route through an environmentally sensitive area. In May 1980, the state Assembly Transportation Committee approved a resolution that requested an answer from the governor at the time, Jerry Brown, and Caltrans as to why certain projects, including SR 76, had not been started.

In the meantime, the Oceanside Development Agency recommended that the new highway be extended west to Pacific Street to aid in redeveloping the downtown area. The San Diego Regional Coastal Commission disagreed with constructing the highway, among other development proposals for downtown Oceanside, due to concerns about destroying habitat along the river and the marsh areas. Soon after, in October 1980, the California Coastal Commission recommended removing the realignment of the freeway from plans entirely, on environmental grounds.

=== Widening and realignment ===
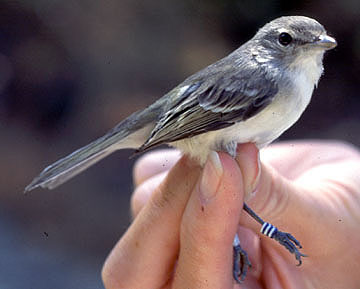
A least Bell's vireo

In 1983, the introduction of a federal gasoline tax of five cents per gallon (one cent per liter) added more funding to complete projects in San Diego County, among other places. From that revenue, $5 million (about $13.2 million in 2024 dollars) was allocated to rebuilding the Bonsall bridge and realigning the highway. Issues cited with the old bridge included the sharp turns at either end and its narrow width, though some members of the community hoped that the old bridge would remain standing as a historical landmark, and a pedestrian bridge. County Supervisor Paul Eckert commissioned a campaign to leave the bridge standing a week later. Plans to replace the bridge were delayed by April, due to issues acquiring the land necessary for the new bridge.

Caltrans tentatively approved the westernmost 2.5 miles (4.0 km) of the SR 76 widening project in May, while noting that there were several more steps in the legal process necessary before construction began. Two years later, concerns were expressed by environmental groups over the potential destruction of the habitat of the least Bell's vireo songbird by the construction of SR 76 and other projects in the region. In 1986, the bird was added to the federal endangered species register. The next year, the Oceanside Jaycees group collected 12,000 signatures supporting the construction of the freeway immediately. At that time, the fatality rate on SR 76 was 222 percent above that of any other state highway in California. The petitions were given to the office of then-Governor George Deukmejian. In November 1987, the U.S. Fish and Wildlife Service approved the project, on condition that Caltrans purchase more land to set up habitat for environmental mitigation.

Funds for the new Bonsall bridge were approved by the California Transportation Commission (CTC) in October 1988, and construction was scheduled to begin in early 1989. In November 1989, the California Coastal Commission gave the go-ahead for the realignment of SR 76 in western Oceanside, from I-5 to Frontier Drive. However, in February 1990, the Sierra Club, National Audubon Society, and League for Coastal Protection filed a lawsuit to have the approval overturned, citing concerns over the destruction of habitat. The Bonsall bridge was completed in early 1990, while the old bridge became a National Historic Place. In 1992, the City of Oceanside offered to purchase land as additional habitat for the songbird, even though it was not a party to the lawsuit. The following year, the city council voted to use the Lawrence Canyon land for commercial use instead of for the environmental mitigation, thus stalling the project. Following this, the CTC rejected the proposal to build the highway, requiring Caltrans to find another parcel to use for constructing habitat. The CTC did approve the proposal a month later, provided that this land was found before construction began. In October, the city council decided to use the Lawrence Canyon land for mitigation after all. Nevertheless, a city councilman raised concerns that the expressway would not be adequate to handle 2010 traffic levels.

The four-lane expressway bypass of Oceanside was constructed beginning in 1994. The first four miles (6.4 km) from I-5 to Foussat Road opened to traffic in late 1995. The cost of this portion was $10 million (about $18.7 million in 2024 dollars); at that time, completion of the rest of the route was expected for 2008. The rerouting of SR 76 away from Mission Avenue resulted in a decrease in business for establishments located along the old routing. On June 12, 1996, the groundbreaking ceremony for the second phase of the project took place, by which time the completion date for the entire roadway had slipped to 2010. This phase between Foussat Road and Jefferies Ranch Road was finished in late 1999. Because the expressway was constructed on top of Mission Avenue east of Old Grove Road, the former was rerouted onto a new alignment that connected to Frazee Road. Mission Avenue was thus fragmented, and does not exist between Frazee Road and Jefferies Ranch Road, where the designation resumes.

=== East of Oceanside ===
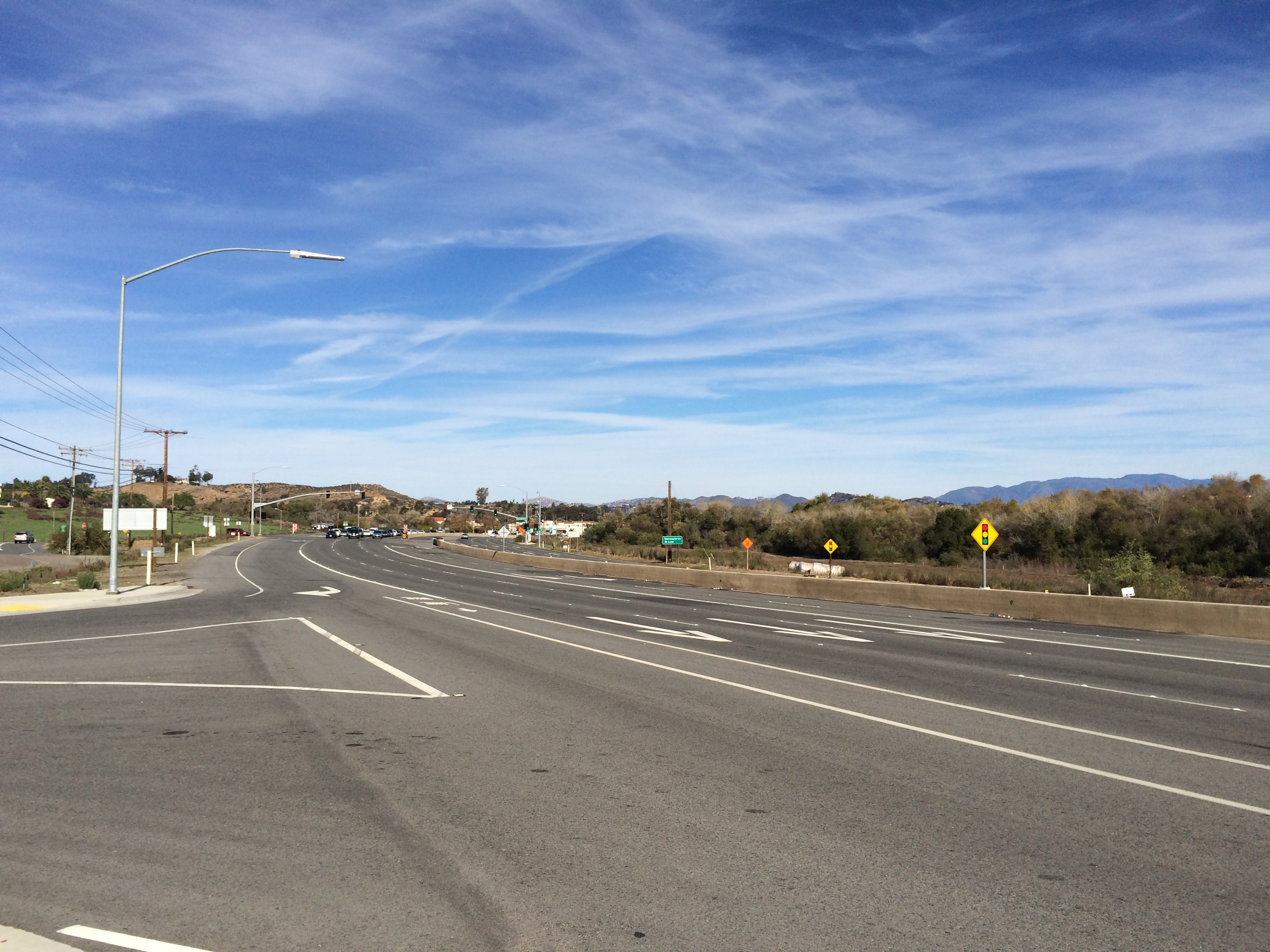
SR 76 in Bonsall

By 2002, Caltrans had two proposals for the part of the widening project between East Vista Way and Mission Road: building the new highway on top of the old one, or constructing a new roadway to the south of the San Luis Rey River. Concerns arose that the TransNet local sales tax would not be extended by voters, leading to the cancellation of that project. The San Diego Association of Governments included the widening east to Bonsall in the regional plan in 2003, but indicated that the portion from Bonsall to I-15 would be dependent on the availability of funding. Residents of Fallbrook and Bonsall criticized the fact that SR 76 was one of the few TransNet projects that was not to be completed by the expiration of the tax in 2008. The city of Oceanside proposed plans for grade-separated interchanges with College Boulevard and Melrose Drive in 2004, as part of a proposal to convert the expressway through Oceanside to a freeway. After complaints from residents, these proposals were tabled.

After TransNet was renewed in November 2004, planning continued for widening the remaining portion of SR 76 west of I-15, due to the frequent accidents that occurred on the eastern portion, although some claimed that the habits of drivers were at fault. The 2007 environmental impact report recommended constructing the new roadway along the route of the old one, rather than moving the entire highway south.

Meanwhile, congestion east of I-15 increased with the opening of four new casinos near Pala. The Pala Indian band was required to pay for the costs to improve the road to mitigate the increased traffic levels from their proposed expansion. Construction began on widening the highway in April 2008, and in March 2009, two lanes of a realigned 1.3-mile-long (2.1 km) segment of SR 76 opened east of I-15. Initially, only two lanes were open, with the other two lanes of this new four-lane divided highway planned to open in September 2009. This improvement was intended to reduce accidents on a stretch of road that carried over 12,000 motorists per day, many headed for either the Pala Indian casino or a new gravel quarry that had recently opened. The casino and quarry owners each paid for half of the $26 million (about $36.8 million in 2024 dollars) cost of the new road. Even after this, in 2009, the corner of SR 76 and Palomar Mountain Road was determined to be the place in the county with the most motorcycle accidents.

Construction started on widening SR 76 between Melrose Drive and South Mission Road in January 2010 to four lanes, funded by the federal and state governments and by TransNet revenue. The project included building a second bridge over the San Luis Rey River. Discussion on whether the route of the highway should go south or north of the river east of Mission Road began later that year, with residents expressing concerns about being able to make left turns. In June 2011, Caltrans decided to use the existing roadway as the path, but agreed to build traffic signals at Via Monserate, South Mission Road, Gird Road, and Old Highway 395. For environmental mitigation, Caltrans purchased the parcel known as Rancho Lilac, which was 902 acres (365 ha). The second Bonsall bridge was finished by April 2012. The westbound lanes between Melrose Drive and Mission Road opened to traffic in October, with the entire roadway projected to be complete by the end of the year. The total cost of the entire widening project east of Melrose Drive is projected to be $371 million.

A request by the city of Oceanside to restore access to Jefferies Ranch Road from SR 76 was declined by Caltrans in late 2012, due to concerns about future expressway expansion to six lanes. In May 2013, construction at the I-15 and SR 76 interchange uncovered a Bison latifrons fossil. Revisions to the interchange were finished in August 2013. The final portion east to I-15 was contracted out in August, and construction was to begin soon afterward and extend until 2017, at a cost of $201 million. In August 2016, traffic was to switch from the existing roadway to the newly constructed one west of I-15, from Gird Road to Old Highway 395. This would allow the older roadway to be reconfigured to carry westbound traffic, while the new roadway would handle eastbound traffic. The new roadway was described as having fewer turns than the older road, which would increase safety. The expansion of the road to four lanes was completed in May 2017; this meant that from about 1.5 miles (2.4 km) east of the interchange with I-15 west to CR S21 the roadway was four lanes wide, including the widening that had been paid for by the owners of a rock quarry.

== Major intersections ==
The entire route is in San Diego County.

Location	mi	km	Destinations	Notes
Oceanside	0.000	0.000	CR S21 (North Coast Highway)	Continuation beyond I-5; former US 101
Oceanside	0.000	0.000	I-5 (San Diego Freeway) – Los Angeles, Santa Ana, San Diego	Interchange; I-5 exit 54A; western end of SR 76
Oceanside	6.721	10.816	CR S14 (North Santa Fe Avenue) – Vista	
Bonsall	9.490	15.273	CR S13 south (East Vista Way) / Old River Road – Vista	Western end of CR S13 overlap
Bonsall	12.472	20.072	CR S13 north (Mission Road) – Fallbrook	Eastern end of CR S13 overlap
	17.012	27.378	Old Highway 395	Former US 395
	17.343	27.911	I-15 (Escondido Freeway) – Riverside, San Bernardino, San Diego	Interchange; I-15 exit 46
Pala	23.012	37.034	CR S16 (Pala Mission Road) – Pala, Temecula	
Pala	24.127	38.829	CR S16 (Pala Mission Road) – Pala, Temecula	
Rincon	32.870	52.899	CR S6 south (Valley Center Road) – Valley Center, Escondido	Western end of CR S6 overlap
	38.146	61.390	CR S6 north (South Grade Road) – Palomar Mountain	Eastern end of CR S6 overlap
	47.790	76.911	CR S7 (East Grade Road) – Palomar Mountain	
Morettis Junction	52.319	84.199	SR 79 – Warner Springs, Santa Ysabel, Julian	Eastern end of SR 76
1.000 mi = 1.609 km; 1.000 km = 0.621 mi: Concurrency terminus
