= Festa del Redentore =

Fireworks festival held in Venice

- Date: Third Sunday of July
- Frequency: Annual
- Locations: Venice, Italy
- Established: 1577
- Founder: Alvise I Mocenigo

The Festa del Redentore is an event held in Venice the third Sunday of July where fireworks play an important role.

The Redentore began as a feast – held on the day of the Feast of the Most Holy Redeemer – to give thanks for the end of the terrible plague of 1576, which killed 50,000 people, including the great painter Tiziano Vecellio (Titian). The Doge Alvise I Mocenigo promised to build a magnificent church if the plague ended. Andrea Palladio was commissioned, assisted by Da Ponte, to build a majestic church on the Island of Giudecca. The church, known as Il Redentore, was consecrated in 1592, and is one of the most important examples of Palladian religious architecture. After the foundation stone was laid, a small wooden church was temporarily built, along with temporary bridge of barges from the Zattere, so that the Doge Sebastiano Venier could walk in procession as far as the tabernacle. Afterwards, the Doge made a pilgrimage to the Church of Redentore every year.

On Saturday, the eve of the festival, fireworks are let off. Preparations begin early in the morning when people begin to decorate their boats, or the small wooden terraces on rooftops from where they can admire the fireworks. At sunset, Saint Mark's basin begins to fill with up with boats of all kinds, festooned with balloons and garlands, and thousands of Venetians await the fireworks while dining on the boats. Around 10 o'clock at night, from pontoons placed nearby the island of San Giorgio Maggiore, the fireworks begin and Saint Mark's basin becomes one of the most atmospheric stages in the world. The fireworks last for around 45 to 60 minutes, illuminating the night and arousing intense emotions in both Venetians and visitors. Once the fireworks are over, the young people of the city head off to the Lido, where they sit on the sand and wait for dawn.

A bridge of barges is built connecting Giudecca to the rest of Venice. From 1950 to 2000 the bridge was built by the Italian Army's 2nd Pontieri Engineer Regiment. Sunday is devoted to religious celebrations.

In 1989, the famous concert of Pink Floyd was held, counted among the most extraordinary and controversial rock concerts ever held in Italy, at the presence of some 200,000 spectators positioned on the banks and boats of the St. Mark's basin. The concert was broadcast by RAI worldwide with an audience of about 100 million viewers.

The 2006 festival celebrated the victory of the Italian national football team in the World Cup and fireworks in the colours of the Italian flag were let off.

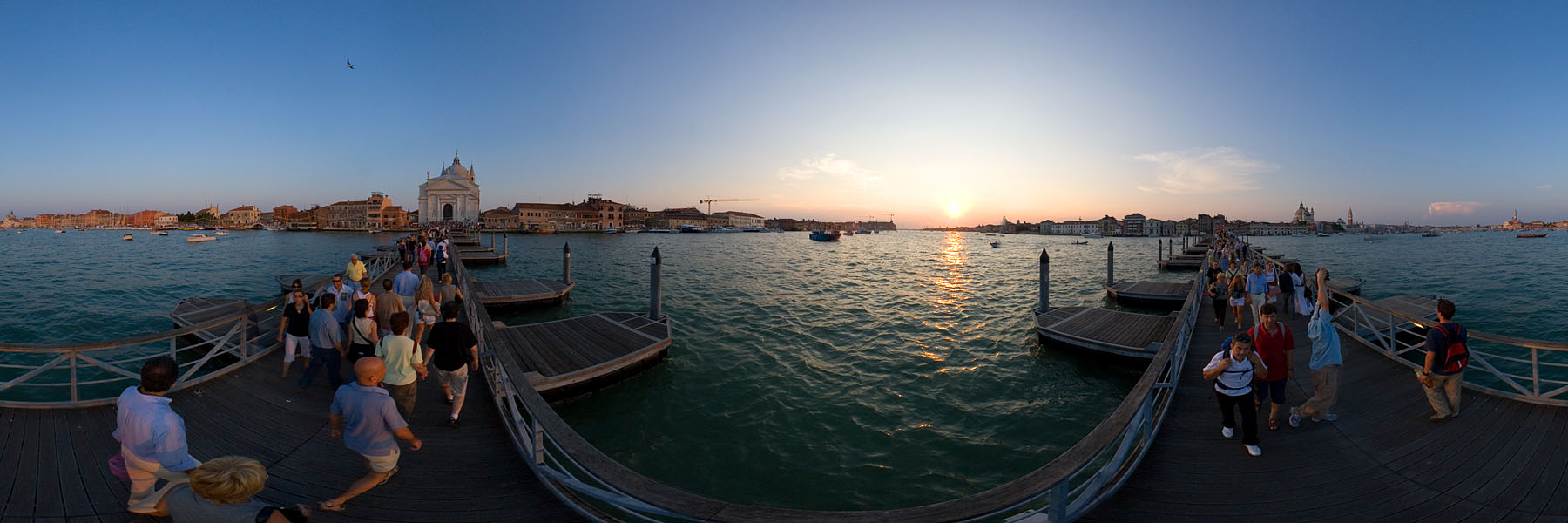
From the pontoon bridge during Festa del Redentore (2006)

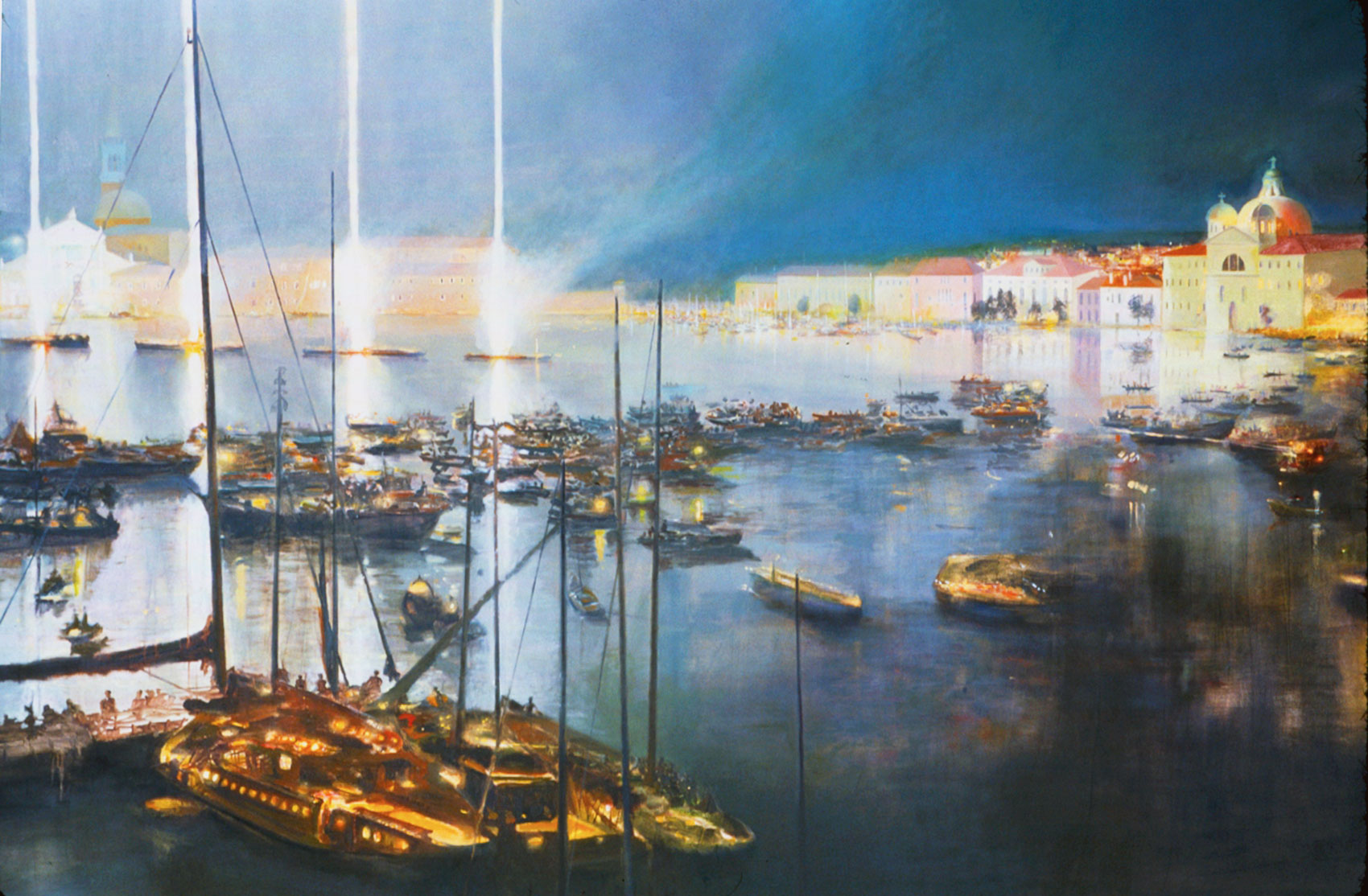
The Fireworks on the Night of the Redentore, oil on canvas, 79'x110' Sergio Rossetti Morosini.

== See also ==
- Pink Floyd in Venice: A Concert for Europe
