= Harrah's Resort Southern California =

Gaming casino and hotel in California, US

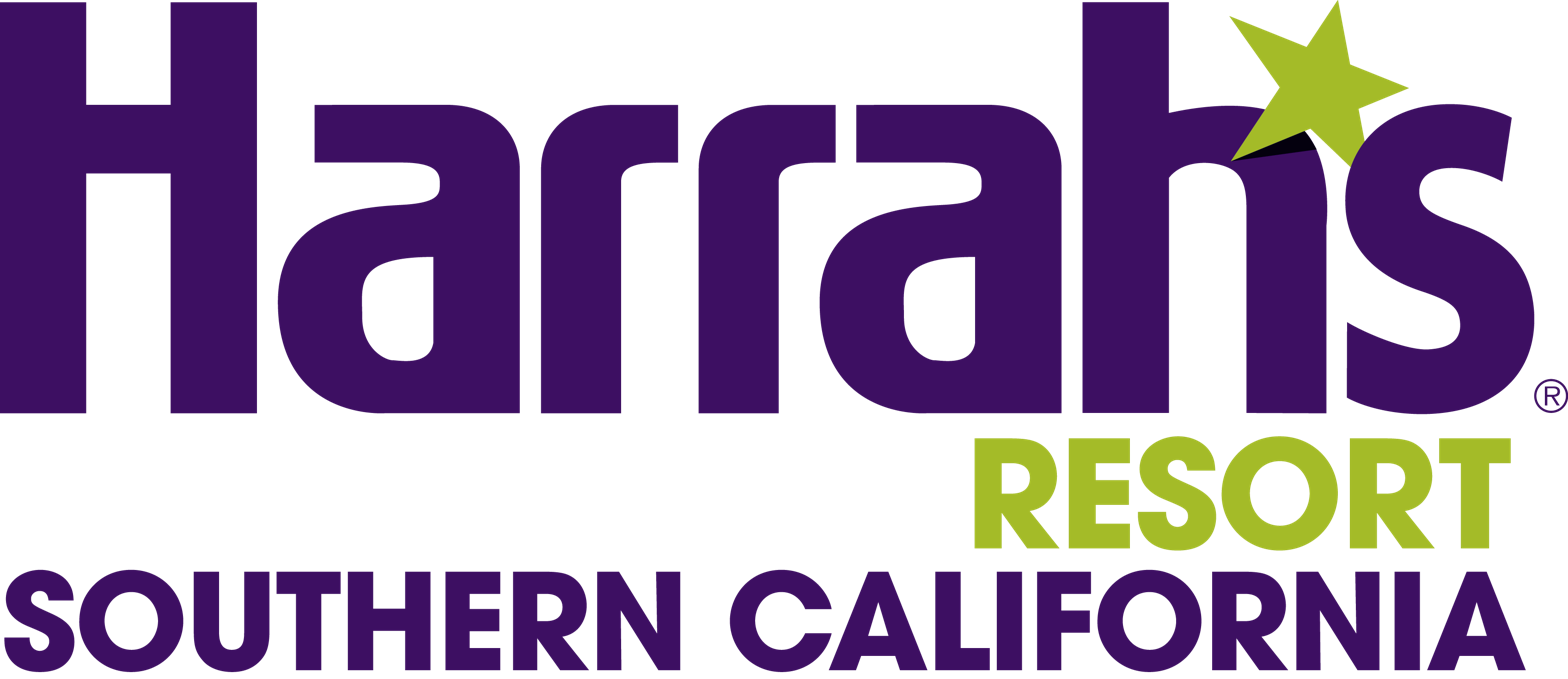

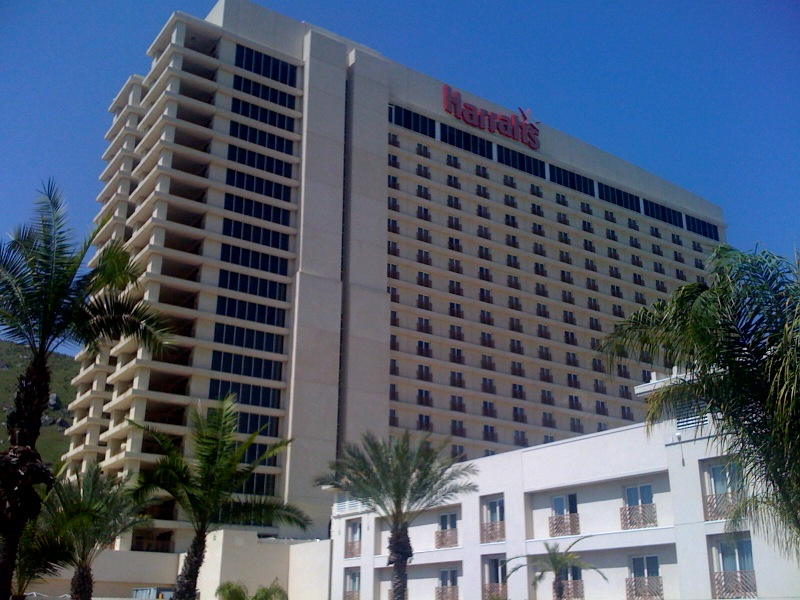
- Interactive map of Harrah's Resort Southern California
- Location: Rincon Reservation, California, U.S. (Funner, California); 777 Harrah's Rincon Way; 33.267416°N 116.955525°W
- Opened: December 20, 2004; 21 years ago
- No. of rooms: 1,087
- Gaming space: 86,000 sq ft (8,000 m^{2})
- Notable restaurants: Earl of Sandwich; Gordon Ramsay Hell’s Kitchen; KJ Chinese Restaurant; Tierra y Mar 'Ritas Cantina Taco Truck Smashburger; SR76 Beerworks; Starbucks; The Café at Harrah's
- Casino type: Land-based
- Owner: Rincon Band of Luiseño Indians
- Operating license holder: Caesars Entertainment
- Architect: Paul Steelman Design Group
- Previous names: Harrah's Rincon (2004–2014)
- Renovated in: 2014, 2015
- Website: caesars.com/harrahs-socal

Harrah's Resort Southern California (formerly Harrah's Rincon) is a Native American gaming casino and integrated resort near Valley Center, California. It is owned by the Rincon Band of Luiseño Indians and operated by Caesars Entertainment.

== History ==
The land on which Harrah's Resort Southern California sits was officially and unanimously renamed by the Rincon Band of Luiseño Mission Indians to Funner on August 1, 2016, with the public unveiling of this change occurring on May 5, 2017. Together with the Tribal Council, Harrah's Resort Southern California management stands firmly committed to promoting "Fun" as the underlying operation guide for business practices.

=== Expansion ===
On November 1, 2012, construction began on a $160-million expansion that included a new 403-room hotel tower and a 23,000 square foot convention center, which can be converted for meetings, concerts, and other uses. The project also consisted of many other expansions, including a renovation of the pool area featuring a lazy river and swim-up bar, a food court comprising Earl of Sandwich and the reopening of Pink's (now Smashburger), a Starbucks location, Corked (featuring regional premium craft beers), Spiked, and Rita's (an indoor/outdoor Mexican restaurant). The lazy river, swim-up bar and pool restaurant were completed during the summer of 2013, while the convention center and the bar Corked were completed by December. Starbucks opened in early 2014. The new hotel tower was partially opened in March and fully open by April 2014, bringing the resort's total room count to 1,087, making it the largest Indian casino resort by room count in the state of California at the time. Spiked and the food court also opened in April. The entire project was officially completed on April 18, 2014. Upon its grand reopening, the resort was renamed Harrah's Resort Southern California. In 2015, after the expansion, the south tower was modernized to mimic the newer north tower.

== Features ==
=== Hotel ===
The hotel has three towers: Dive Inn (formerly Garden Tower, opened in 2002 and latest renovation in 2024), Resort Tower South (formerly Spa Tower, opened in 2004 and renovated in 2015) and Resort Tower North (opened in 2014). There are 662 rooms in the Resort Tower South and Dive Inn and there are 403 rooms in the Resort Tower North.

The North and South Towers includes non-smoking and smoking Luxury rooms, as well as the La Jolla suite (2 rooms on each floor of the South Tower and the majority of the rooms on the 20th floor of the North and South Towers), 4 Coronado Suites total on each floor which includes a balcony with a table and 2 lounge chairs facing east (South Tower) and north or south (North Tower), Catalina suite which is exclusive to the renovated South Tower and features 1 king and 2 queen beds, extra space and 2 lounge chairs and a table on the private balcony facing west and the "Mayoral Suite" located on the top floor of the South Tower. In 2017, the resort introduced "Resort Wellness Rooms and Resort Wellness Suites" located on the 2nd floor of the North Tower which has Vitamin C infused showers, bathrobes and slippers as well as exercise equipment in each room. The rooms are also in close proximity to the fitness center on the 2nd floor of the South Tower. Dive Inn includes non-smoking and smoking Deluxe rooms with a small balcony. The Palomar Suite is the smallest suite in this tower while the larger Laguna and Malibu suites include a private small heated pool outside the room. Rooms on the first floor facing the pool also have a private balcony with lounge chairs.

=== Casino ===
The casino consists of 1600 slot machines and 51 tables. The architects for this casino were the Steelman Partners of Las Vegas, NV, providing interior and lighting design.

=== Other amenities ===
The resort also includes a spa and nearby Woods Valley Golf Club.

== See also ==
- List of integrated resorts
