= Black Pope (disambiguation) =

Black Pope is the nickname of the Superior General of the Society of Jesus.

Black Pope or The Black Pope may also refer to:

- Giulio Andreotti (1919–2013), an Italian politician and prime minister of Italy, who was nicknamed "The Black Pope"
- Anton LaVey (1930–1997), an American author, musician, and occultist, and the founder of the Church of Satan, who was labelled "The Black Pope"
- "Papa Nero" (song) or "Black Pope", a song by Pitura Freska
- Black Pope, a villain in The Order, a 2003 film
- The Black Pope, a novel by John Maddox Roberts
- The Black Pope: History of the Jesuits, a book by Margaret Anna Cusack
- Elijah Burke, an American professional wrestler who used the nickname "Black Pope"
