= Rincon Band of Luiseño Indians =

Coordinates: 33°16′3″N 116°57′20″W

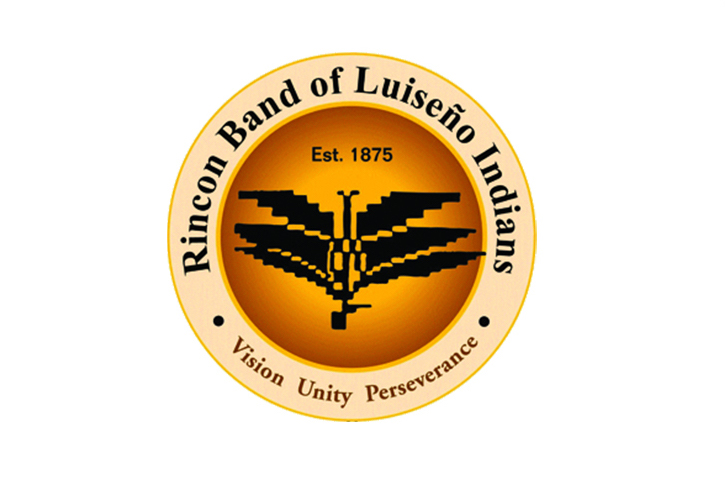

Regions with significant populations
- United States (California)

Religion
- Traditional tribal religion,

The Rincon Band of Luiseño Indians are a federally recognized tribe of Luiseño who live on the Rincon Indian Reservation in Valley Center in San Diego County, California. It is one of six such tribes in Southern California that are composed of Luiseño people. The Luiseño are considered one of the groups of the California Mission Indians.

The band developed Harrah's Resort Southern California (previously known as Harrah's Rincon Resort and Casino) that is located on the reservation, as well as Rincon Reservation Road Brewery, the first tribally-owned craft brewery in Southern California. In May, 2022 (now closed) the band opened the first tribal-owned tasting room outside of reservation boundaries in the San Diego neighborhood of Ocean Beach. The tribe is a member of the Indian Health Council, which runs a health clinic on the reservation, adjacent to the casino.

== Reservation ==
Location of Rincon Indian Reservation

Rincon Indian Reservation lies in northeastern San Diego County, along the San Luis Rey River. The reservation was established in 1875, near the Payomkawichum village of Wáșxa.

California State Route 76 was constructed north of the reservation. The total area of the reservation is 4,275 acres (1,730 ha).

The population on the reservation is around 1,500. In the 2010 census, 188 people in the Valley Center CDP (census-designated place) self-identified as Native Americans. Tribal enrollment is about 500.

The Harrah's Resort Southern California opened in 2004 and is owned by the Rincon Band of Luiseño Indians. The resort is operated by Caesars Entertainment.

=== Demographics ===
Rincon Reservation, California – Racial and ethnic composition Note: the US Census treats Hispanic/Latino as an ethnic category. This table excludes Latinos from the racial categories and assigns them to a separate category. Hispanics/Latinos may be of any race.
Race / Ethnicity (NH = Non-Hispanic)	Pop 2000	Pop 2010	Pop 2020	% 2000	% 2010	% 2020
White alone (NH)	197	116	66	13.18%	9.55%	6.03%
Black or African American alone (NH)	2	0	0	0.13%	0.00%	0.00%
Native American or Alaska Native alone (NH)	368	401	440	24.62%	33.00%	40.18%
Asian alone (NH)	12	3	5	0.80%	0.25%	0.46%
Native Hawaiian or Pacific Islander alone (NH)	0	6	13	0.00%	0.49%	1.19%
Other race alone (NH)	1	0	2	0.07%	0.00%	0.18%
Mixed race or Multiracial (NH)	24	28	24	1.61%	2.30%	2.19%
Hispanic or Latino (any race)	891	661	545	59.60%	54.40%	49.77%
Total	1,495	1,215	1,095	100.00%	100.00%	100.00%

== See also ==
- Rincon, California

== Notes ==
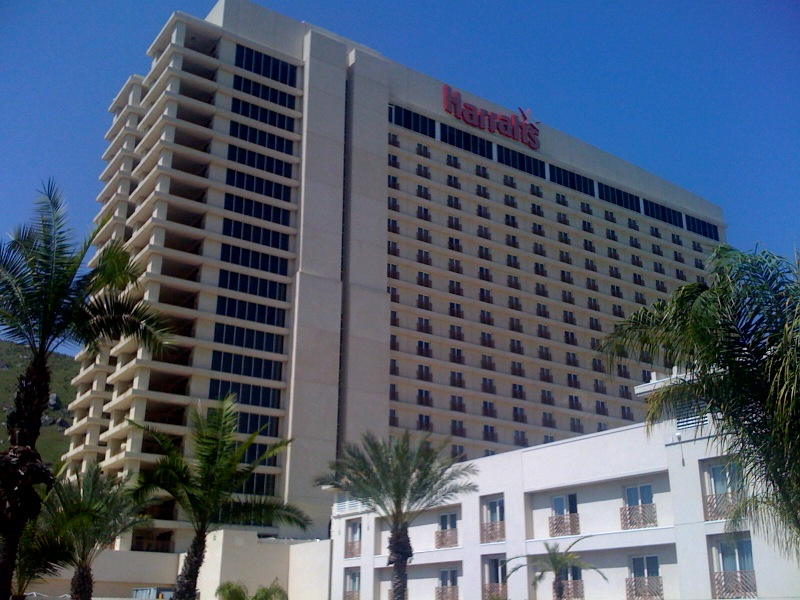
Harrah's Resort Southern California is located on the reservation
