= Judge Pope =

Judge Pope may refer to:

- Nathaniel Pope (1784–1850), judge for the United States District Court for the District of Illinois
- Walter Lyndon Pope (1889–1969), judge of the United States Court of Appeals for the Ninth Circuit
- William Hayes Pope (1870–1916), judge of the United States District Court for the District of New Mexico

== See also ==
- Justice Pope (disambiguation)
