= Pope, California =

Pope, California may refer to:

- Pope, San Joaquin County, California, a place in California
- Pope Valley, California
