= Pabrico, Union City, California =

Neighborhood in Union City, California

Coordinates: 37°34′58″N 122°00′23″W

Pabrico (formerly, Pabrico Siding) is a neighborhood of Union City, Alameda County, California. It lies at an elevation of 52 feet (16 m). Formerly an unincorporated community. Pabrico is named after Oakland Paving Brick Co. operated here from 1901 to 1912.
