= Palomar Mountain, California =

Unincorporated community in California, United States

- Unincorporated community
- Location within California Location within the United States
- Coordinates: 33.3228128°N 116.8786359°W
- Country: United States
- State: California
- County: San Diego
- Elevation: 5,325 ft (1,623 m)
- Time zone: UTC-8 (Pacific (PST))
  - Summer (DST): UTC-7 (PDT)
- Area codes: 442/760
- GNIS feature ID: 272859

Palomar Mountain is an unincorporated community in San Diego County, California.

== Description ==
The community is located near the north-central edge of San Diego County along County Route S7 within the Cleveland National Forest, southeast of Palomar Mountain State Park and southwest of Palomar Mountain and Palomar Observatory.

== Climate ==
According to the Köppen climate classification system, Palomar Mountain has a warm-summer Mediterranean climate, abbreviated "Csa" on climate maps. Annual precipitation on the mountain averages about 30 inches (highly variable from year to year), mostly falling between October and March. Snow falls during cold winter storms. Summers are mostly dry, except for occasional thunderstorms in late July to early September. The humid climate supports woods of oak, pine, fir and cedar on large swaths of the mountain.

Climate data for Palomar Mountain, California, 1991–2020 normals, extremes 1938–present
Month	Jan	Feb	Mar	Apr	May	Jun	Jul	Aug	Sep	Oct	Nov	Dec	Year
Record high °F (°C)	82 (28)	77 (25)	82 (28)	83 (28)	91 (33)	104 (40)	100 (38)	100 (38)	100 (38)	97 (36)	80 (27)	80 (27)	104 (40)
Mean maximum °F (°C)	63.4 (17.4)	63.9 (17.7)	69.5 (20.8)	76.1 (24.5)	82.0 (27.8)	88.7 (31.5)	92.9 (33.8)	92.0 (33.3)	88.3 (31.3)	81.0 (27.2)	71.5 (21.9)	64.8 (18.2)	94.3 (34.6)
Mean daily maximum °F (°C)	51.4 (10.8)	51.0 (10.6)	56.0 (13.3)	61.3 (16.3)	69.3 (20.7)	78.5 (25.8)	84.3 (29.1)	84.4 (29.1)	79.3 (26.3)	69.1 (20.6)	58.2 (14.6)	50.7 (10.4)	66.1 (19.0)
Daily mean °F (°C)	44.2 (6.8)	43.6 (6.4)	47.3 (8.5)	51.5 (10.8)	58.8 (14.9)	67.8 (19.9)	74.1 (23.4)	74.5 (23.6)	69.4 (20.8)	59.9 (15.5)	50.3 (10.2)	43.7 (6.5)	57.1 (13.9)
Mean daily minimum °F (°C)	35.1 (1.7)	35.2 (1.8)	37.8 (3.2)	41.8 (5.4)	48.4 (9.1)	57.0 (13.9)	62.7 (17.1)	63.0 (17.2)	57.9 (14.4)	49.5 (9.7)	42.5 (5.8)	36.6 (2.6)	47.3 (8.5)
Mean minimum °F (°C)	24.4 (−4.2)	24.0 (−4.4)	25.4 (−3.7)	28.1 (−2.2)	33.4 (0.8)	41.2 (5.1)	55.3 (12.9)	55.1 (12.8)	45.5 (7.5)	36.8 (2.7)	29.0 (−1.7)	23.9 (−4.5)	19.8 (−6.8)
Record low °F (°C)	8 (−13)	12 (−11)	16 (−9)	19 (−7)	24 (−4)	28 (−2)	36 (2)	36 (2)	30 (−1)	18 (−8)	17 (−8)	8 (−13)	8 (−13)
Average precipitation inches (mm)	5.93 (151)	7.34 (186)	4.61 (117)	2.00 (51)	0.89 (23)	0.17 (4.3)	0.29 (7.4)	0.68 (17)	0.48 (12)	1.21 (31)	2.25 (57)	4.56 (116)	30.41 (772.7)
Average snowfall inches (cm)	6.9 (18)	7.5 (19)	9.4 (24)	3.9 (9.9)	0.0 (0.0)	0.0 (0.0)	0.0 (0.0)	0.0 (0.0)	0.0 (0.0)	0.0 (0.0)	1.7 (4.3)	5.3 (13)	34.7 (88.2)
Average precipitation days (≥ 0.01 in)	6.8	7.5	6.1	3.8	2.1	0.4	1.1	1.3	1.3	2.2	3.4	6.0	42.0
Average snowy days (≥ 0.1 in)	1.0	2.1	1.0	1.0	0.1	0.0	0.0	0.0	0.0	0.0	0.3	1.5	7.0
Source 1: NOAA
Source 2: National Weather Service
