= Rincon, California =

Unincorporated community in California, United States

- Unincorporated community
- Location within California
- Coordinates: 33°17′17″N 116°57′29″W
- Country: United States
- State: California
- County: San Diego
- Elevation: 1,030 ft (310 m)
- Time zone: UTC-8 (Pacific (PST))
  - Summer (DST): UTC-7 (PDT)
- ZIP code: 92061
- Area codes: 442/760

Rincon is an unincorporated community in San Diego County, California, United States. The community is located near the Rincon Indian Reservation, from which the name is derived.

== Climate ==
According to the Köppen Climate Classification system, Rincon has a warm-summer Mediterranean climate, abbreviated "Csa" on climate maps.
