= Papa Nero (song) =

"Papa Nero ("Black Pope")"

Song by Pitura Freska
- Published: 1997

"Papa Nero" ("Black Pope") is a song by the Venetian reggae band Pitura Freska, with lyrics in the Venetian language.

It was performed at the 1997 Sanremo Music Festival, and became very popular throughout Italy. It is notable for being one of the very few songs (if not the only song) in Venetian that got significant media exposure outside the Veneto region.

The lyrics are inspired on a prediction by Nostradamus that the next-to-last Pope will come from Africa. They can be read as a light-hearted anti-racist and anti-xenophobic message. Some famous verses were:

| [...] | [...] |
| Perchè xe scrito, dito, stradito, dai oracołi | "Since it's written, said, confirmed, by the oracles |
| La piovra perderà i tentacołi | The octopus will lose its tentacles |
| E cascarà i tabù col penultimo Gesù | And the taboos will crumble with the next-to-last Jesus |
| E el sarà un omo dal continente nero | And he will be a man from the Black Continent |
| Sarà vero? | Could it be true? |
| Dopo Miss Italia aver un Papa nero? | After Miss Italy, shall we have a black Pope? |
| No me par vero | It's hard to believe |
| Un Papa nero | A black Pope |
| che scolta łe me canson in venessian | who listens to my songs in Venetian |
| Perché el xe nero african | Because he is black African" |
