= Justice Pope =

Justice Pope may refer to:

- Jack Pope (1913–2017), associate justice and chief justice of the Supreme Court of Texas
- Young J. Pope (1844–1911), associate justice and chief justice of the South Carolina Supreme Court

== See also ==
- Judge Pope (disambiguation)
