= Pitura Freska =

Reggae music group

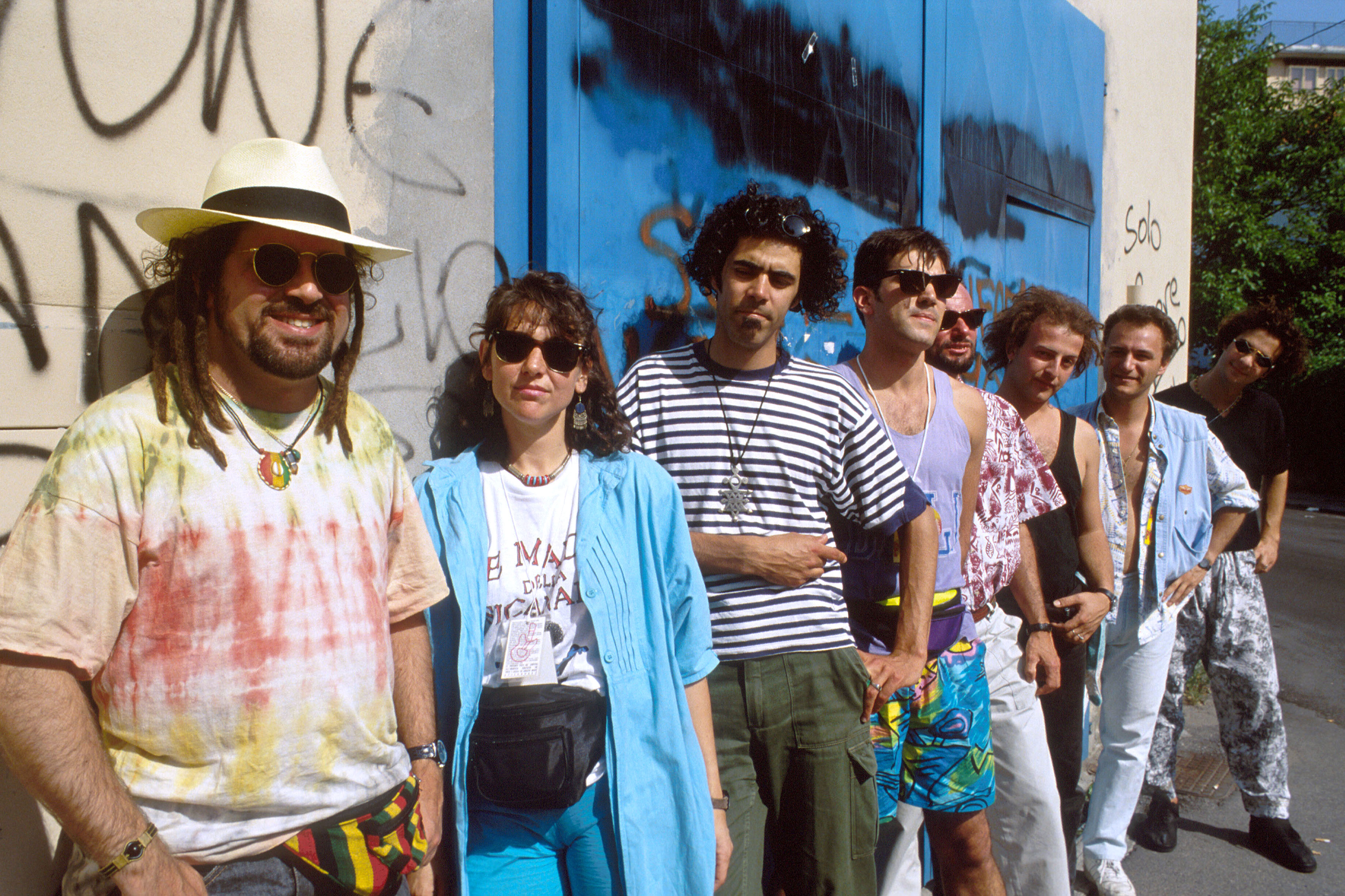
Pitura Freska in 1997

Pitura Freska (Venetian pronunciation: [piˈtu.ra ˈfre.ska], Venetian for "wet paint", in Italian pittura fresca) was a reggae music group based in Venice, Italy, consisting of Marco Forieri (saxophone and vocal), Gaetano "Sir Oliver Skardy" Scardicchio (vocals), Francesco Duse (guitar), Cristiano Verardo (guitar), Valerio Silvestri (trumpet), Toni Costantini (trombone) and Francesco "Ciuke" Casucci (bass).

The band was formed in 1989 and had his breakout with the 1991 album Na bruta banda, which sold over 200,000 copies, and which included the Targa Tenco winning song "Pin Floi". In 1997, they entered the 47th edition of the Sanremo Music Festival with "Papa Nero" ("Black Pope"). They disbanded in 2002, with lead singer Oliver Skardy making his solo debut in 2004 with the album Grande Bidello.

== Discography ==
- Ossigeno – 1990
- Na bruta banda – 1991
- Duri i banchi – 1993
- Yeah – 1995
- Yeah in Dub – 1996
- Gran calma – 1997
- Olive – 1998
