= Plainsburg, California =

Unincorporated community in California, United States

Plainsburg
- Unincorporated community
- Location in California Plainsburg (the United States)
- Coordinates: 37°13′59″N 120°19′28″W
- Country: United States
- State: California
- County: Merced
- Elevation: 220 ft (67 m)

Plainsburg (formerly Plainsberg and Welch's Store) is an unincorporated community in Merced County, California, United States. It is located 4 miles (6.4 km) west of Le Grand, at an elevation of 220 feet (67 m).

Plainsburg was said to be a thriving farming center in the nineteenth century. It had several businesses and was legally incorporated for a time. The town declined in importance when it was bypassed by the Southern Pacific Railroad to the west and later the Santa Fe Railroad to the east. A grocery store remained as of 1992; the cemetery and elementary school are still present today.

A post office operated at Plainsburg from 1869 to 1907.
