= Pala Mesa, California =

Unincorporated community in California, United States

- Unincorporated community
- Location within California Location within the United States
- Coordinates: 33°19′56″N 117°09′49″W
- Country: United States
- State: California
- County: San Diego
- Elevation: 354 ft (108 m)
- Time zone: UTC-8 (Pacific (PST))
  - Summer (DST): UTC-7 (PDT)
- Area codes: 760/442
- GNIS feature ID: 1661175

Pala Mesa is an unincorporated community in San Diego County, California, United States. The community is at the junction of Interstate 15 and California State Route 76, 11.1 miles (17.9 km) south of Temecula. It sits adjacent to the town of Fallbrook.

== History ==
Pala Mesa was founded in 1955 as a 686-acre (278 ha) development for ranch sites ranging from 15 to 50 acres (6.1 to 20.2 ha). It was advertised in association with nearby Fallbrook. Construction on the Pala Mesa Golf Course, which sits in the northwestern corner of the Pala Mesa area adjacent to the former U.S. Route 395 and the current Interstate 15, began construction in March 1961. The course opened in 1963.

Pala Mesa Village, a neighborhood of smaller homes near the I-15 and SR-76 interchange, was approved for construction in July 1963. The County Planning Commission attempted to block the construction of the neighborhood because some of the lots were smaller than 6,000 square feet (560 m^{2}), the minimum size for a lot per the local ordinance. The San Diego County Board of Supervisors rejected the notion. The developers began selling homes in the community in October 1965 and the adobe brick homes were advertised as "America's first adobe community."

In July 1964, professional golfer Shirley Englehorn golfed at the Pala Mesa Golf Course and set a new record for the course with a four-under-par. The course became the home of the Palomar College men's golf team in 1965.
