= Palomar Mountain =

Mountain in San Diego County, California, United States

Palomar
- Monte Palomar (Spanish)
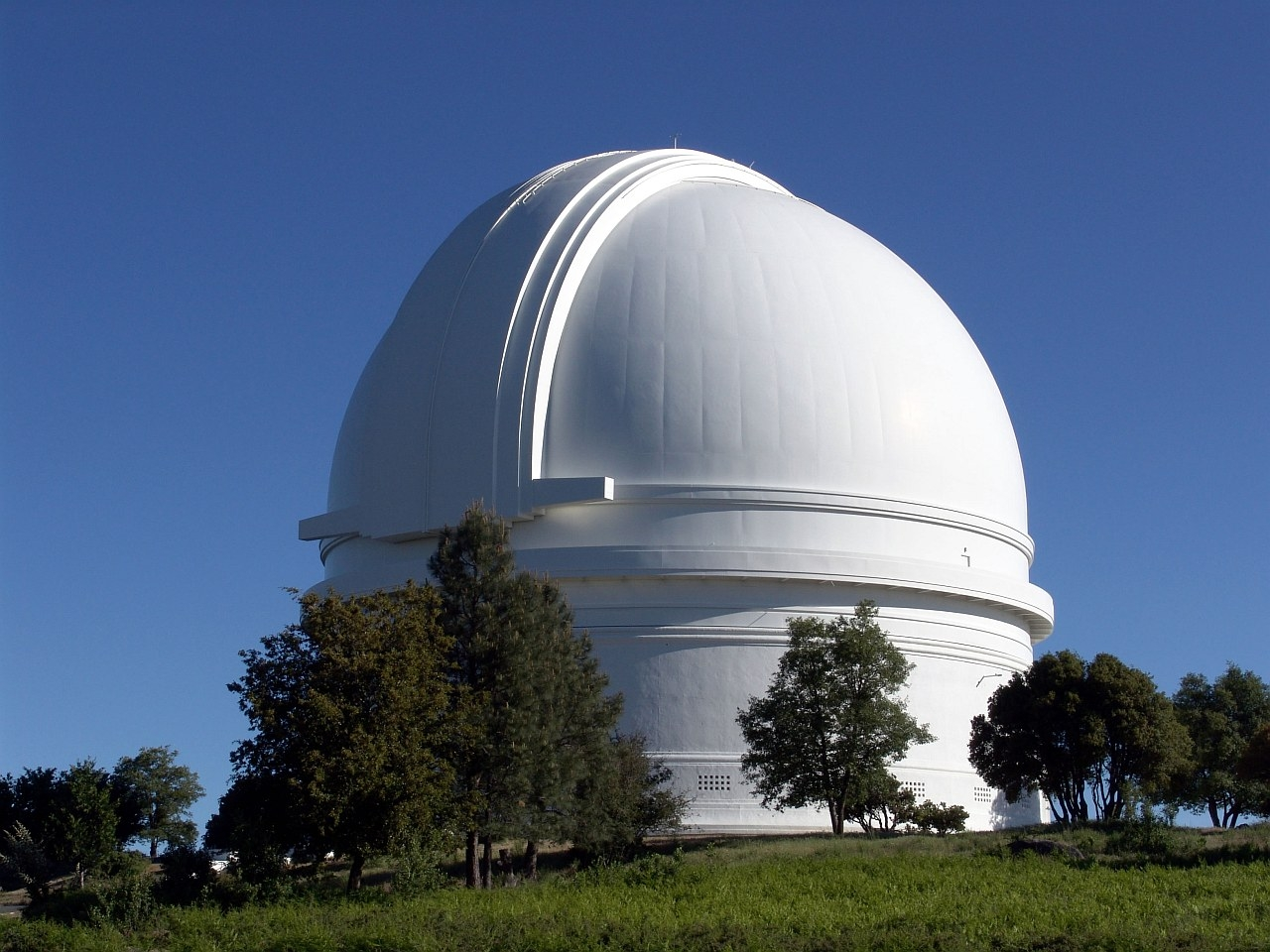
- View of Palomar Observatory located near the High Point summit of the Palomar Mountain range.

Highest point
- Elevation: 6,142 ft (1,872 m) NAVD 88
- Prominence: 2,856 ft (871 m)
- Listing: San Diego peak list
- Coordinates: 33°21′49″N 116°50′11″W

Geography
- Location within San Diego County, California
- Location: San Diego County, California
- Parent range: Peninsular Ranges
- Topo map: USGS Palomar Observatory

Climbing
- Easiest route: Road

Palomar Mountain (/ˈpæləmɑːr/ PAL-ə-mar; Spanish: Monte Palomar [paloˈmaɾ]) is a mountain ridge in the Peninsular Ranges in northern San Diego County, California. It is known as the location of Palomar Observatory and the Hale Telescope, and known for Palomar Mountain State Park.

== History ==
The Luiseño name for Palomar Mountain was Paauw and High Point was called Wikyo. The Spanish name Palomar, meaning "pigeon roost" or "place of the pigeons", comes from the Spanish colonial era in Alta California when Palomar Mountain was known as the home of band-tailed pigeons. The peak was once called Mount Joseph Smith but reverted to its Spanish name, Palomar, in 1901.

During the 1890s, the population was sufficient to support three public schools, and it was a popular summer resort for Southern California, with three hotels in operation part of the time, and a tent city in Doane Valley each summer.

Nathan Harrison, the first African American homesteader in San Diego area, purchased several acres on the western slope of the mountain in the 1880s and graded a road that became a popular tourist route that is now called Nate Harrison grade. According to an article by Daniel Weiss, "Harrison was briefly married twice, both times to Luiseño Indian women who were part of a community that lived on the mountain," and he was baptized into the Catholic faith "by a Luiseño chief in Rincon who had converted to Catholicism." Harrison's tall tales of the mountain's fauna, including his overcoming of countless grizzlies and aggressive mountain lions, and his blithesome, joking disposition, made him locally famous among the county's travelers.

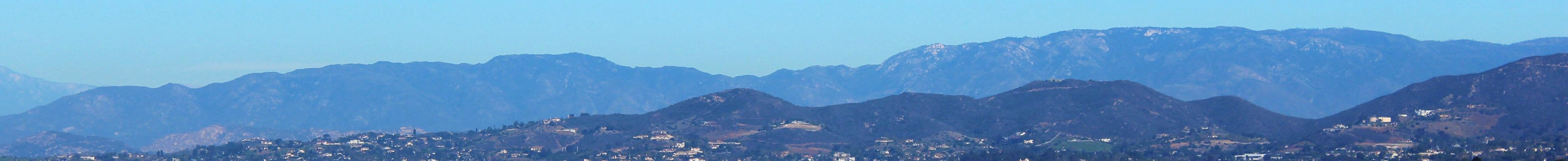
Panoramic Shot of Palomar Mountain, taken from Carlsbad, CA

== Palomar Observatory ==
Palomar Mountain is most famous as the home of Palomar Observatory, which includes the Hale Telescope. The 200-inch (5.1 m) telescope was the world's largest telescope from 1949 until 1975, and remained the most important until 1992. The observatory currently has four large telescopes, the most recent one being a 40-inch (1.0 m) robotic infrared one operational since 2021.

== Palomar Mountain State Park ==
Palomar Mountain is the location of Palomar Mountain State Park, a California State Park. There are campgrounds for vacationers, and a campground for local school children until San Diego Unified School District was forced to close it due to state budget cuts. The park averages 70,000 visitors annually. The campgrounds in the park were temporarily closed on October 2, 2011, due to state budget cuts. The park was among 70 California State Parks threatened by budget cuts in fiscal years 2011–2012 and 2012–2013, but the park and the campgrounds remain open.

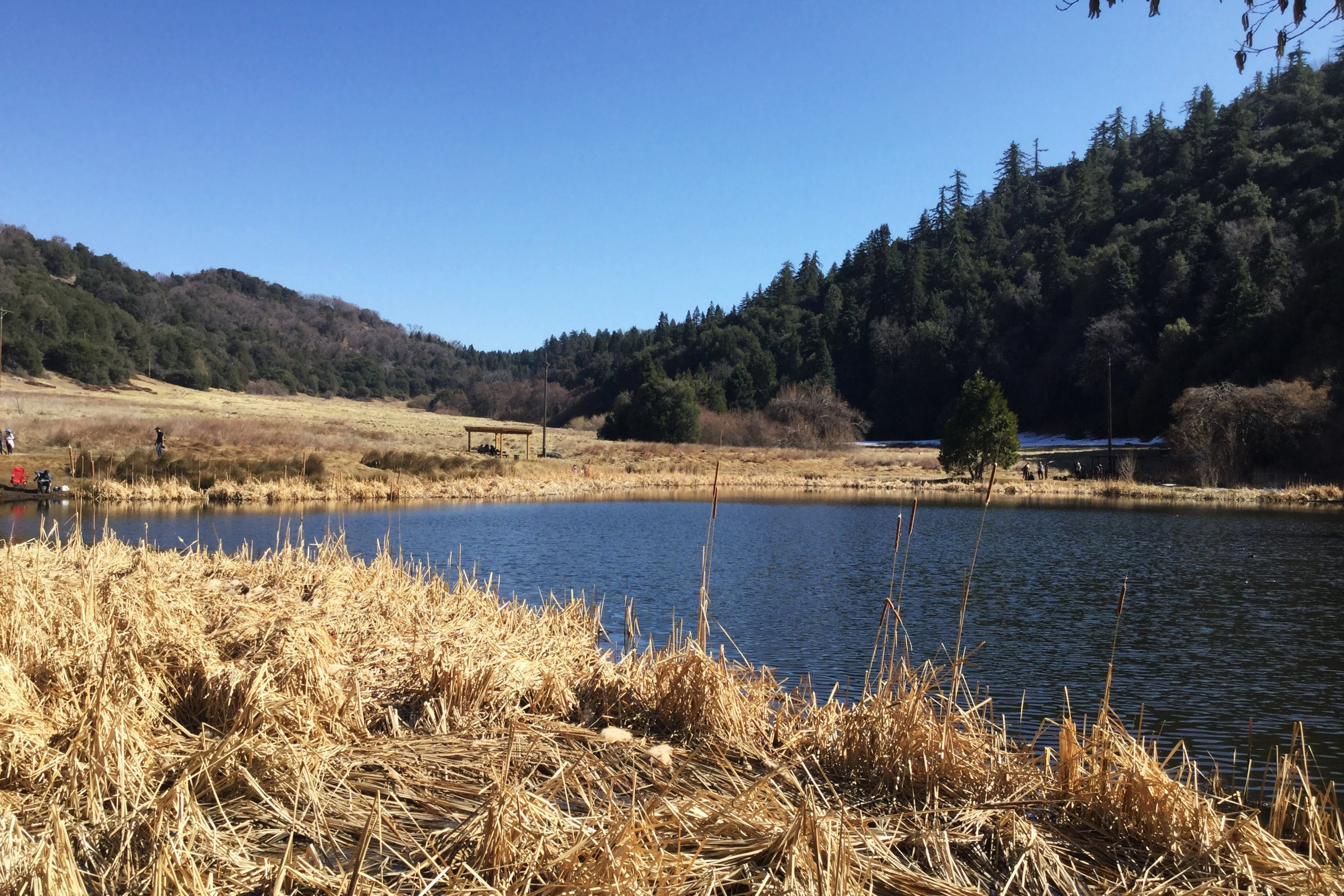
Doane Valley in Palomar Mountain State Park

Palomar Mountain, especially in the state park area, is densely wooded with abundant oak and conifer tree species (pine, cedar, fir). Ferns are abundant everywhere in the shady forest. The forest is supported by annual precipitation totals in excess of 30 inches (760 mm). Part of the natural area is old-growth forest and recognized by the Old-Growth Forest Network.

Beginning in the 1920s, a fire lookout tower has been present on Boucher Hill on Palomar Mountain. The tower had been active until it was abandoned in 1983 and then was reactivated when the San Diego/Riverside County Chapter of the FFLA Forest Fire Lookout Association – San Diego/Riverside Chapter began manning it in 2012. Boucher Hill sees more than 11,000 visitors a season. The tower opens around May 1 in conjunction with the fire season and closes in early December. During this period, the tower is typically staffed 7 days a week from 9am to 5pm.

Doane Valley, located within the State Park, is home to the Camp Palomar Outdoor School for 6th-grade students in San Diego Unified School District.

== Oak Knoll Campground ==
At the base of Palomar Mountain on County Route S6 is Oak Knoll Campground, formerly known as Palomar Gardens. In the 1950s and 1960s, Palomar Gardens was made famous by its owner and resident, UFO contactee George Adamski. Adamski had a self-built, wooden observatory at Palomar Gardens and photographed objects in the night sky that he claimed were UFOs. Adamski co-authored the bestselling Flying Saucers Have Landed in 1953, about his alleged alien encounter experiences, and in particular his meetings with a friendly "Space Brother" from Venus named Orthon. The 1977 film The Crater Lake Monster had many scenes filmed on Palomar Mountain, including scenes shot at the summit restaurant, but not the scenes of the monster in a lake.

== High Point ==
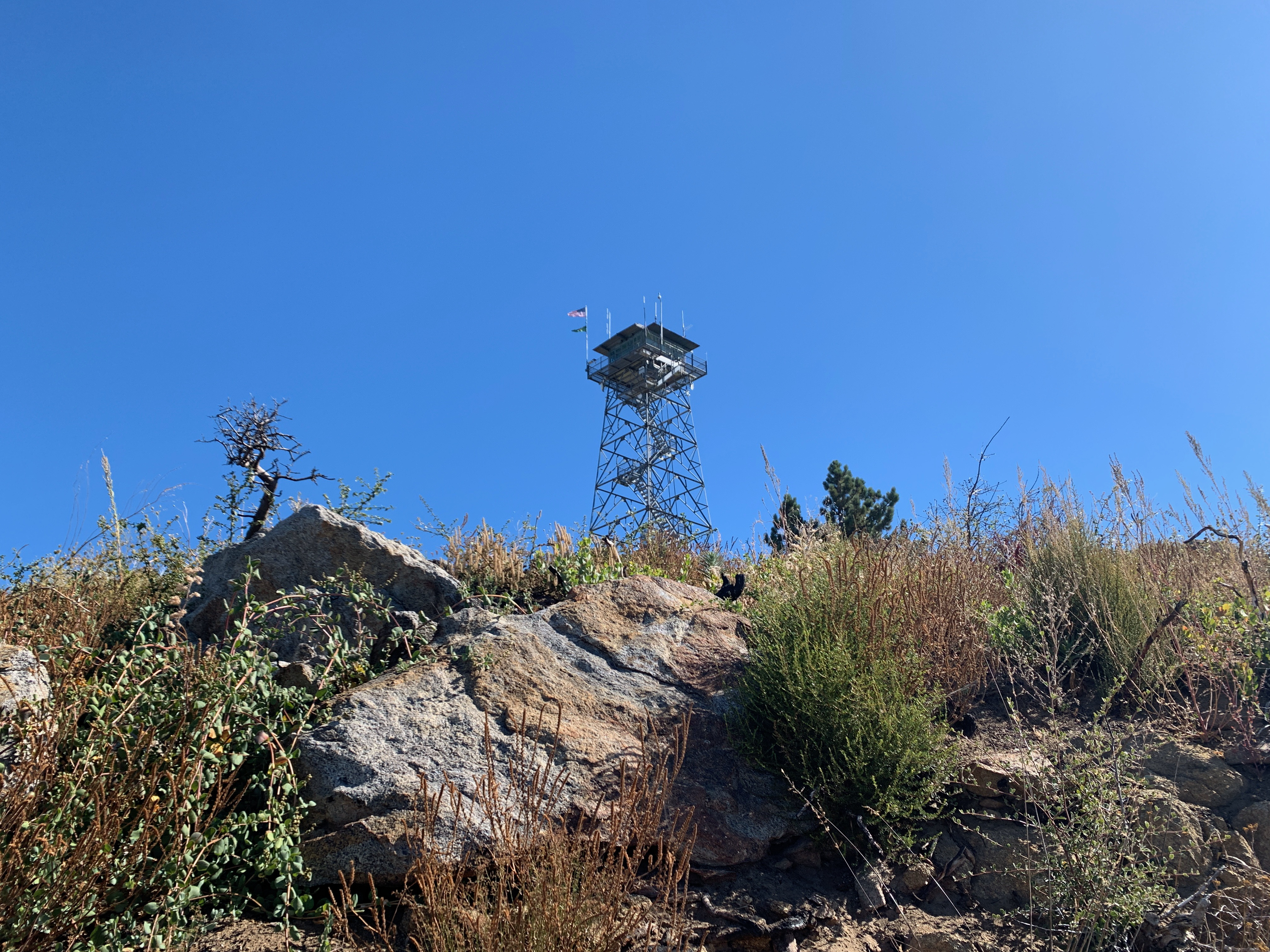
Fire Tower on Palomar Mountain

High Point, in the Palomar Mountain range, is one of the highest peaks in San Diego County. At an elevation of 6,140 feet (1,871 m), it is surpassed by Cuyamaca Peak (at 6,512 feet (1,985 m)) and Hot Springs Mountain (the county's highest point, at 6,533 feet (1,991 m)). They are dwarfed by the higher 11,500-foot (3,505 m) San Bernardino Mountains a relatively short 52 miles (84 km) to the north, in San Bernardino County and the 10,000-foot (3,000 m) San Jacinto Mountains 30 miles (48 km) north in Riverside County. High Point is located approximately 2 miles (3 km) east of the observatory; however, it is not accessible by the public from that direction, as the observatory itself and adjacent land are private property, and the road to High Point from the observatory is blocked by a permanently closed gate. It may be reached via Palomar Divide Truck Trail, a dirt road that starts off Highway 79 near Warner Springs. The trip is 13 miles (21 km) one way, with 3,000 feet (1,000 m) of elevation gain via Palomar Divide Truck Trail. High Point can also be hiked on the Oak Grove Trail, the oldest established trail in the Palomar Ranger District. The hike is 13.5 miles (21.7 km) roundtrip. There is an operational USFS fire lookout tower on High Point, built in 1964. It is 70 feet (21 m) tall, making it the tallest USFS fire tower in California. It was brought back into service in 2009 and is staffed by the San Diego/Riverside County Chapter of the FFLA Forest Fire Lookout Association – San Diego/Riverside.

Other local peaks include Birch Hill (5,710 ft; 1,740 m) and Boucher Hill (5,436 ft; 1,657 m).

== Access ==
South Grade Road, the stretch of San Diego County Route S6 going from State Route 76 to the summit, provides access with over 20 hairpin turns over a distance of less than 7 mi (11 km).

== Climate ==
According to the Köppen Climate Classification system, Palomar Mountain has a hot-summer Mediterranean climate, abbreviated "Csa" on climate maps. Annual precipitation on the mountain averages 30–35 inches or 760–890 millimeters, mostly falling between October and April – although it has varied from 10.46 inches or 265.7 millimeters in the "rain year" from July 2020 to June 2021, to 64.94 inches or 1,649.5 millimeters between July 2022 and June 2023. Snow falls during cold winter storms, and averages 26.2 inches or 0.67 meters annually, varying from 4.3 inches or 0.11 meters between July 2013 and June 2014 to 120.0 inches or 3.0 meters between July 1948 and June 1949. Summers are mostly dry, except for thunderstorms in July to early September. The humid climate supports a forest of oak, pine, fir, and cedar on large swaths of the mountain.

Climate data for Palomar Mountain Observatory, CA (1991–2020 normals)
Month	Jan	Feb	Mar	Apr	May	Jun	Jul	Aug	Sep	Oct	Nov	Dec	Year
Mean daily maximum °F (°C)	51.4 (10.8)	51.0 (10.6)	56.0 (13.3)	61.3 (16.3)	69.3 (20.7)	78.5 (25.8)	84.3 (29.1)	84.4 (29.1)	79.3 (26.3)	69.1 (20.6)	58.2 (14.6)	50.7 (10.4)	66.1 (18.9)
Daily mean °F (°C)	44.2 (6.8)	43.6 (6.4)	47.3 (8.5)	51.5 (10.8)	58.8 (14.9)	67.8 (19.9)	74.1 (23.4)	74.5 (23.6)	69.4 (20.8)	59.9 (15.5)	50.3 (10.2)	43.7 (6.5)	57.1 (13.9)
Mean daily minimum °F (°C)	37.1 (2.8)	36.1 (2.3)	38.7 (3.7)	41.8 (5.4)	48.4 (9.1)	57.0 (13.9)	63.9 (17.7)	64.5 (18.1)	59.5 (15.3)	50.8 (10.4)	42.5 (5.8)	36.6 (2.6)	48.1 (8.9)
Average precipitation inches (mm)	5.93 (151)	7.34 (186)	4.61 (117)	2.00 (51)	0.89 (23)	0.17 (4.3)	0.29 (7.4)	0.68 (17)	0.48 (12)	1.21 (31)	2.25 (57)	4.56 (116)	30.41 (772)
Average snowfall inches (cm)	6.2 (16)	10.6 (27)	3.1 (7.9)	3.5 (8.9)	0.0 (0.0)	0.0 (0.0)	0.0 (0.0)	0.0 (0.0)	0.0 (0.0)	0.0 (0.0)	0.4 (1.0)	2.4 (6.1)	26.2 (67)
Average precipitation days (≥ 0.01 in)	6.8	7.5	6.1	3.8	2.1	0.4	1.1	1.3	1.3	2.2	3.4	6.0	42.0
Average snowy days (≥ 0.1 in)	1.0	2.1	1.0	1.0	0.1	0.0	0.0	0.0	0.0	0.0	0.3	1.5	7.0
Source: NOAA

The upper elevations of the Palomar Mountain range have notably different habitats than its lower-elevation foothills. The lower regions are in the California montane chaparral and woodlands sub-ecoregion, adapted to the xeric/dry Mediterranean climate with chaparral and woodlands flora. The higher regions are in the California mixed evergreen forest sub-ecoregion, with California black oaks, closed-cone pines, firs, and other California oaks and conifers. Higher elevations receive considerably more moisture than the coastal and inland valley lower slopes, with 30–35 in (76–89 cm) of precipitation. They can also receive snow from winter storms.

== See also ==
- California montane chaparral and woodlands
- California oak woodlands
- Closed-cone pine forests

== Sources ==
- "High Point". Geographic Names Information System. United States Geological Survey, United States Department of the Interior.
- "Palomar Mountain East Grade (S7)". SundayMorningRides.com.
- "Palomar Mountain South Grade (S6)". SundayMorningRides.com.
- "Palomar Mountain". Geographic Names Information System. United States Geological Survey, United States Department of the Interior.
