= Pine Grove, Mendocino County, California =

Unincorporated community in California, United States

Pine Grove
- Unincorporated community
- Location in California Pine Grove (the United States)
- Coordinates: 39°20′58″N 123°48′51″W
- Country: United States
- State: California
- County: Mendocino

Pine Grove is an unincorporated community in Mendocino County, California, United States. The historic settlement is near the entrance to Point Cabrillo Light Station, north of Mendocino. In the 19th century, it had a hotel, a store, and a brewery.

== History ==
Captain Peter Thompson farmed and raised cattle at Pine Grove in 1853. The settlement's hotel and bar served nearby Caspar, and Brown & Wooster operated a store there during the 1860s. The hotel property belonged for many years to Harry Kier.

Charles David Ferdinand Sass established the Pine Grove Brewery in 1873. It supplied beer to Mendocino, Fort Bragg, and Pine Grove's own saloon and dance hall. The brewery was demolished in September 1909.

Carpenter and Millberry's 1914 county history described Pine Grove as a farming community with 4 or 5 dwellings.

== Historic site ==
The restored Kearn Farmhouse stands within the historic settlement.
