= San Marco basin =

Part of Venetian Lagoon in front of Piazzetta San Marco

Coordinates: 45.4295°N 12.3450°E

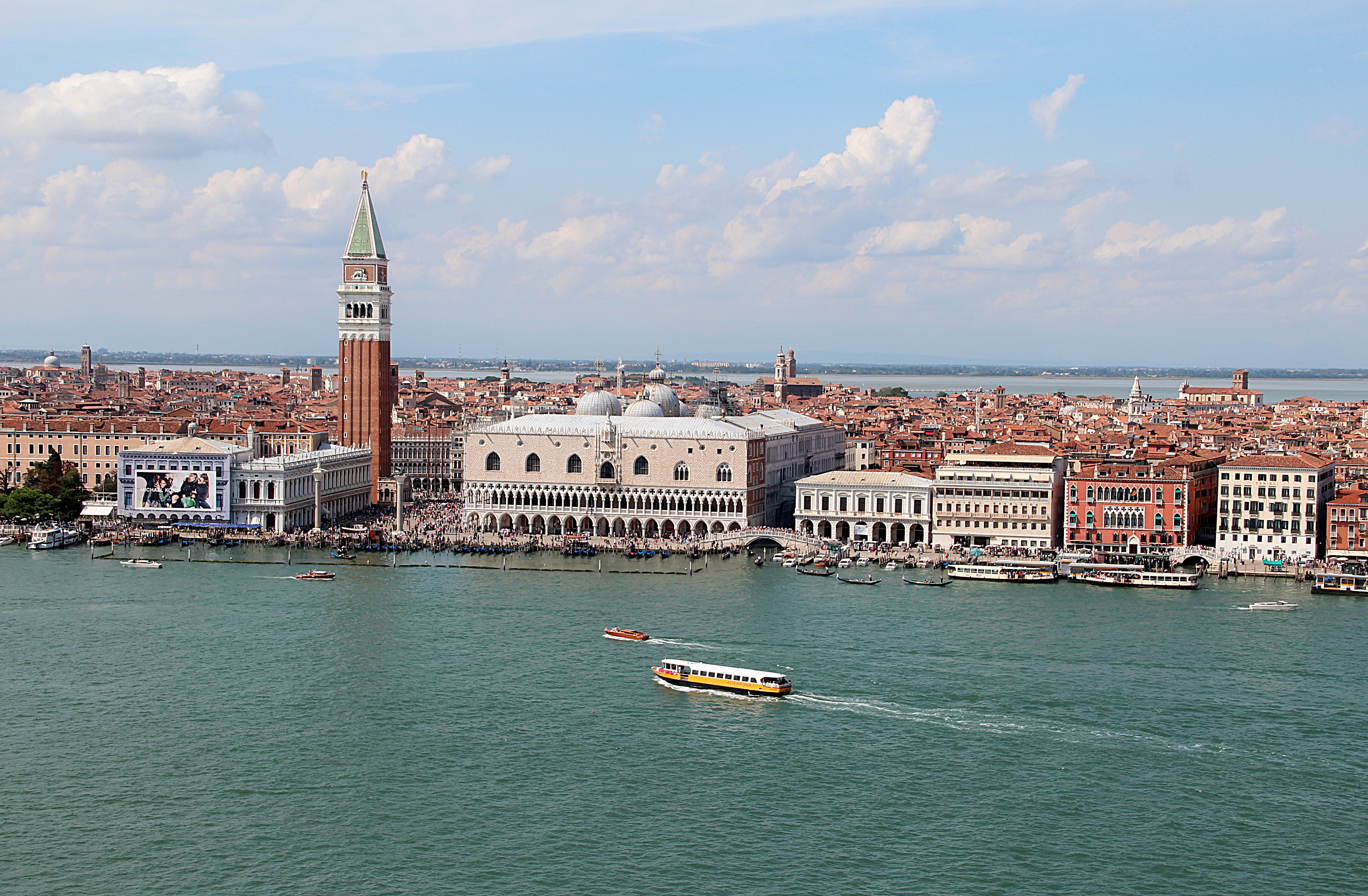
San Marco basin seen from the bell tower of the basilica of San Giorgio Maggiore

San Marco basin (Italian: Bacino San Marco; Venetian: Basin de San Marco) in Venice, Italy, is an area of the Venetian Lagoon that faces the Riva degli Schiavoni and Doge's Palace of the San Marco sestiere.
