= Valley Center, California =

Valley Center
- census-designated place
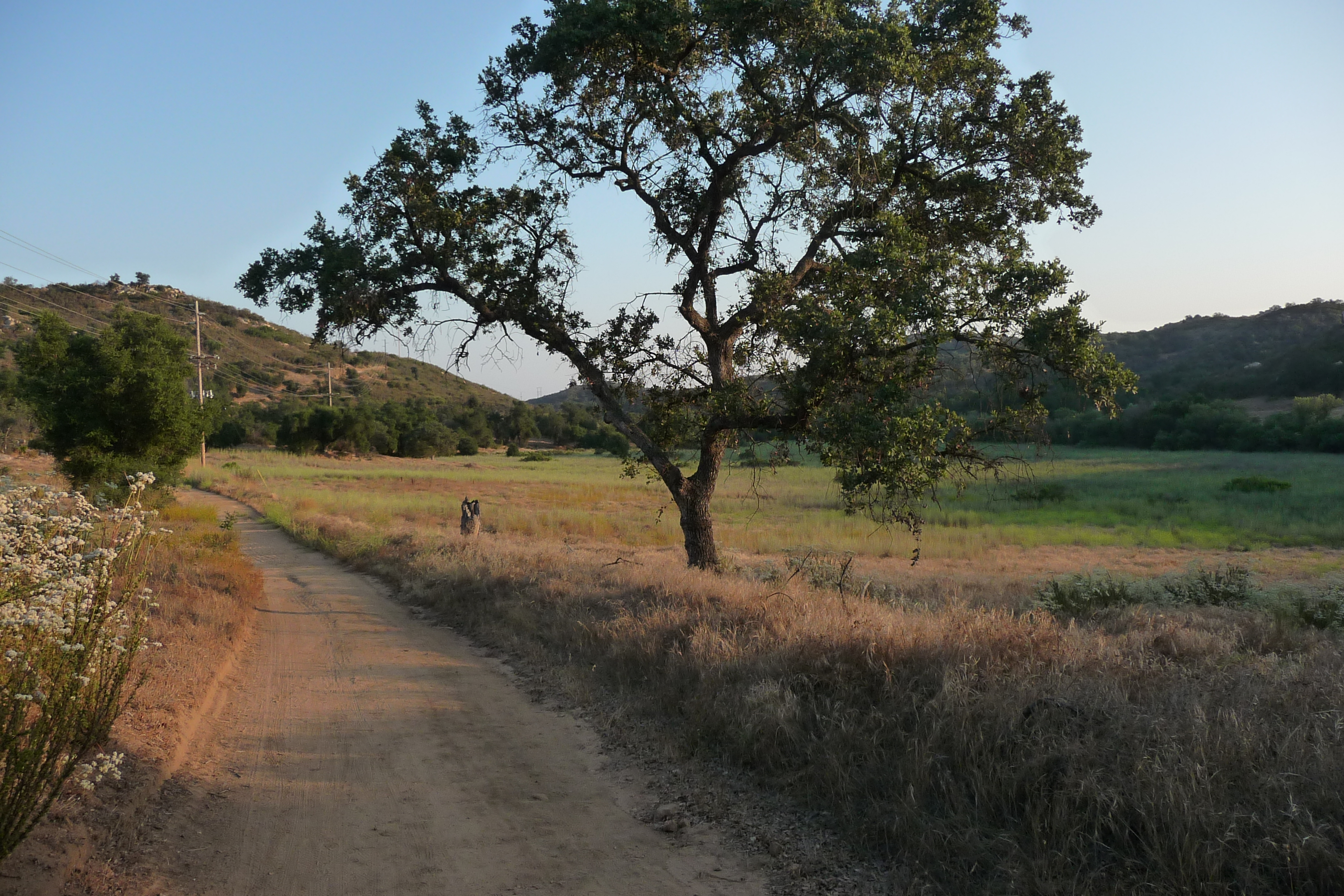
- Valley Center
- Interactive map of Valley Center
- Location in the United States
- Coordinates: 33°14′26″N 117°0′51″W
- Country: United States
- State: California
- County: San Diego

Area
  - Total: 27.445 sq mi (71.083 km^{2})
  - Land: 27.445 sq mi (71.083 km^{2})
  - Water: 0 sq mi (0 km^{2}) 0%
- Elevation: 1,300 ft (400 m)

Population (2020)
  - Total: 10,087
  - Density: 367.53/sq mi (141.90/km^{2})
- Time zone: UTC-8 (PST)
  - Summer (DST): UTC-7 (PDT)
- ZIP code: 92082
- Area codes: 442/760
- FIPS code: 06-81736
- GNIS feature IDs: 1661616, 2409396

Valley Center is a census-designated place (CDP) in San Diego County, California, United States. The population was 10,087 at the 2020 census, up from 9,277 at the 2010 census.

== History ==
In the late 1860s, the area now known as Valley Center was referred to as Bear Valley, and was the habitat of the now-extinct California grizzly bear, pictured on the flag of California. In 1866, the largest grizzly ever recorded in California was shot and killed in Valley Center.

== Geography ==
According to the United States Census Bureau, the CDP has a total area of 27.4 square miles (71 km^{2}), all land.

=== Climate ===
According to the Köppen climate classification system, Valley Center has a warm-summer Mediterranean climate abbreviated "Csa" on climate maps. On March 30, 2023, a tornado warning was issued by the National Weather Service which is extremely rare for this part of the US.

== Demographics ==
Historical population
| Census | Pop. | Note | %± |
|---|---|---|---|
| 1980 | 1,242 | | — |
| 1990 | 1,711 | | 37.8% |
| 2000 | 7,323 | | 328.0% |
| 2010 | 9,277 | | 26.7% |
| 2020 | 10,087 | | 8.7% |
U.S. Decennial Census; 1860–1870 1880-1890; 1900 1910 1920; 1930 1940 1950; 1960 1970 1980; 1990 2000 2010; 2020

Valley Center was first listed as a census designated place in the 1980 U.S. census.

=== Racial and ethnic composition ===
Valley Center CDP, California – Racial and ethnic composition Note: the US Census treats Hispanic/Latino as an ethnic category. This table excludes Latinos from the racial categories and assigns them to a separate category. Hispanics/Latinos may be of any race.
| Race / Ethnicity (NH = Non-Hispanic) | Pop 2000 | Pop 2010 | Pop 2020 | % 2000 | % 2010 | % 2020 |
|---|---|---|---|---|---|---|
| White alone (NH) | 5,664 | 5,933 | 5,560 | 77.35% | 63.95% | 55.12% |
| Black or African American alone (NH) | 37 | 82 | 100 | 0.51% | 0.88% | 0.99% |
| Native American or Alaska Native alone (NH) | 171 | 130 | 185 | 2.34% | 1.40% | 1.83% |
| Asian alone (NH) | 96 | 281 | 357 | 1.31% | 3.03% | 3.54% |
| Native Hawaiian or Pacific Islander alone (NH) | 14 | 16 | 17 | 0.19% | 0.17% | 0.17% |
| Other race alone (NH) | 16 | 22 | 71 | 0.22% | 0.24% | 0.70% |
| Mixed race or Multiracial (NH) | 119 | 232 | 444 | 1.63% | 2.50% | 4.40% |
| Hispanic or Latino (any race) | 1,206 | 2,581 | 3,353 | 16.47% | 27.82% | 33.24% |
| Total | 7,323 | 9,277 | 10,087 | 100.00% | 100.00% | 100.00% |

=== 2020 census ===
As of the 2020 census, Valley Center had a population of 10,087 and a population density of 367.5 inhabitants per square mile (141.9/km^{2}).

The census reported that 99.8% of the population lived in households, 0.2% lived in non-institutionalized group quarters, and 0.0% were institutionalized. Valley Center was 0.0% urban and 100.0% rural.

There were 3,152 households, out of which 31.8% included children under the age of 18, 65.4% were married-couple households, 4.7% were cohabiting couple households, 15.8% had a female householder with no partner present, and 14.1% had a male householder with no partner present. 14.8% of households were one person, and 8.1% were one person aged 65 or older. The average household size was 3.19. There were 2,525 families (80.1% of all households).

The age distribution was 21.5% under the age of 18, 8.2% aged 18 to 24, 21.6% aged 25 to 44, 28.3% aged 45 to 64, and 20.4% who were 65 years of age or older. The median age was 43.6 years. For every 100 females, there were 104.2 males, and for every 100 females age 18 and over there were 103.4 males age 18 and over.

There were 3,327 housing units at an average density of 121.2 units per square mile (46.8 units/km^{2}), of which 3,152 (94.7%) were occupied. Of these, 82.6% were owner-occupied, and 17.4% were occupied by renters. The housing vacancy rate was 5.3%; the homeowner vacancy rate was 1.5%, and the rental vacancy rate was 5.1%.

=== 2023 estimates ===
In 2023, the US Census Bureau estimated that 19.8% of the population were foreign-born. Of all people aged 5 or older, 71.0% spoke only English at home, 26.7% spoke Spanish, 0.4% spoke other Indo-European languages, and 1.9% spoke Asian or Pacific Islander languages. Of those aged 25 or older, 86.4% were high school graduates and 35.6% had a bachelor's degree.

The median household income was $116,620, and the per capita income was $46,664. About 9.1% of families and 12.4% of the population were below the poverty line.

== Arts and culture ==
=== Museums ===
Valley Center History Museum was founded in 2003. Exhibits include a stagecoach which served as a Civil War ambulance, provided local transportation, and was featured in a number of Western motion pictures; a preserved California Grizzly Bear; and memorabilia.

=== Events ===
On Memorial Day weekend, the town remembers fallen veterans at the Valley Center Stampede Rodeo and Festival.

Every year, the town celebrates their western heritage with the Valley Center Western Days Parade and Country Fair.

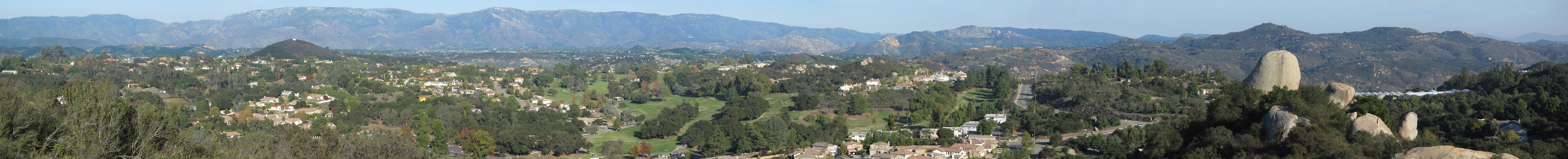
Valley Center

== Government ==
In the California State Legislature, Valley Center is in the 40th senatorial district, represented by Republican Brian Jones, and in the 75th Assembly district, represented by Republican Carl DeMaio.

In the United States House of Representatives, Valley Center is in California's 48th congressional district, represented by Republican Darrell Issa.

Valley Center also serves as the seat of the tribal governments of the Rincon Band of Luiseño Indians and the San Pasqual Band of Diegueno Mission Indians reservations, east of the CDP area.

== Education ==
Almost all of it is in the Valley Center-Pauma Unified School District. A small section of the CDP extends into the Escondido Union School District and the Escondido Union High School District.

== Notable people ==
- June Allyson, actress
- Fred Astaire, actor/dancer
- Glen Bell, founded Taco Bell chain
- Fred Biletnikoff, former Oakland Raiders wide receiver
- Louis Bromfield, Author
- Daniel Brunskill, NFL offensive tackle
- J.J. Cale, musician
- Gary Cooper, actor
- Kevin Craft, former UCLA quarterback
- Billy Cundiff, NFL kicker
- John DeLorean, auto tycoon
- Gary Garrison, former San Diego Chargers football player
- Kirby Grant, actor and rancher
- Jack Haley, actor, the Tin Man in The Wizard of Oz
- Charles Hatfield, rainmaker
- Mike Leake, MLB pitcher
- Katie Leclerc, actress
- Denise Mueller-Korenek, cyclist, world speed record holder
- Merle Oberon, actress
- Dick Powell, actor
- Steve Reeves, Hercules actor
- Trevor Reilly, former NFL linebacker, defensive lineman
- Irene Ryan, actress, Granny on The Beverly Hillbillies
- Sean Salisbury, former NFL quarterback, television sports analyst
- Randolph Scott, actor
- John Wayne, actor
- Lawrence Welk, American accordionist, bandleader, and television impresario
- Mae West, actress
- Carol Williams, international concert organist and San Diego civic organist since 2001
- Sam Zimbalist, movie producer
