= List of minor planets: 594001–595000 =

The following is a partial list of minor planets, running from minor-planet number 594001 through 595000, inclusive. The primary data for this and other partial lists is based on JPL's "Small-Body Orbital Elements" and data available from the Minor Planet Center. Critical list information is also provided by the MPC, unless otherwise specified from Lowell Observatory. A detailed description of the table's columns and additional sources are given on the main page including a complete list of every page in this series, and a statistical break-up on the dynamical classification of minor planets.

Also see the summary list of all named bodies in numerical and alphabetical order, and the corresponding naming citations for the number range of this particular list. New namings may only be added to this list after official publication, as the preannouncement of names is condemned by the Working Group for Small Bodies Nomenclature of the International Astronomical Union.

Near-Earth obj.	MBA (inner)	MBA (outer)	Centaur
Mars-crosser	MBA (middle)	Jupiter trojan	Trans-Neptunian obj.
Unclassified

== 594001–594100 ==
Designation			Discovery			Properties		Ref
Permanent	Provisional	Named after	Date	Site	Discoverer(s)	Category	Diam.	Ref
594001	2016 EP_{53}	—	March 15, 2012	Mount Lemmon	Mount Lemmon Survey	·	1.2 km	MPC · JPL
594002	2016 EH_{54}	—	December 29, 2014	Haleakala	Pan-STARRS 1	·	1.1 km	MPC · JPL
594003	2016 ET_{56}	—	January 13, 2002	Palomar	NEAT	·	720 m	MPC · JPL
594004	2016 EB_{57}	—	June 3, 2009	Mount Lemmon	Mount Lemmon Survey	·	1.3 km	MPC · JPL
594005	2016 EQ_{58}	—	February 20, 2009	Kitt Peak	Spacewatch	PHO	730 m	MPC · JPL
594006	2016 EC_{60}	—	August 26, 2003	Cerro Tololo	Deep Ecliptic Survey	·	710 m	MPC · JPL
594007	2016 EK_{60}	—	October 22, 2011	Kitt Peak	Spacewatch	·	570 m	MPC · JPL
594008	2016 EB_{67}	—	February 4, 2016	Haleakala	Pan-STARRS 1	NYS	1.0 km	MPC · JPL
594009	2016 EO_{67}	—	February 24, 2012	Mount Lemmon	Mount Lemmon Survey	MAS	580 m	MPC · JPL
594010	2016 EJ_{73}	—	April 28, 2001	Kitt Peak	Spacewatch	·	1.2 km	MPC · JPL
594011	2016 EW_{76}	—	October 10, 2007	Mount Lemmon	Mount Lemmon Survey	·	730 m	MPC · JPL
594012 Bulavina	2016 EQ_{87}	Bulavina	December 27, 2011	Mayhill-ISON	L. Elenin	·	880 m	MPC · JPL
594013	2016 EC_{90}	—	December 18, 2011	ESA OGS	ESA OGS	·	890 m	MPC · JPL
594014	2016 EL_{90}	—	April 30, 2005	Kitt Peak	Spacewatch	·	1.4 km	MPC · JPL
594015	2016 EO_{110}	—	April 11, 2002	Anderson Mesa	LONEOS	PHO	1.0 km	MPC · JPL
594016	2016 EA_{117}	—	May 2, 2006	Mount Lemmon	Mount Lemmon Survey	·	740 m	MPC · JPL
594017	2016 EQ_{118}	—	November 16, 2003	Apache Point	SDSS Collaboration	V	670 m	MPC · JPL
594018	2016 EA_{125}	—	January 18, 2016	Haleakala	Pan-STARRS 1	·	970 m	MPC · JPL
594019	2016 ER_{136}	—	May 3, 2008	Mount Lemmon	Mount Lemmon Survey	·	750 m	MPC · JPL
594020	2016 EA_{137}	—	September 15, 2006	Kitt Peak	Spacewatch	·	980 m	MPC · JPL
594021	2016 EQ_{141}	—	March 20, 2002	Kitt Peak	Spacewatch	·	790 m	MPC · JPL
594022	2016 EC_{143}	—	March 2, 2009	Mount Lemmon	Mount Lemmon Survey	·	830 m	MPC · JPL
594023	2016 EJ_{144}	—	March 15, 2012	Kitt Peak	Spacewatch	·	920 m	MPC · JPL
594024	2016 ED_{150}	—	April 22, 2012	Kitt Peak	Spacewatch	MAR	800 m	MPC · JPL
594025	2016 EG_{170}	—	January 19, 2012	Haleakala	Pan-STARRS 1	·	860 m	MPC · JPL
594026	2016 EK_{174}	—	December 29, 2011	Kitt Peak	Spacewatch	PHO	780 m	MPC · JPL
594027	2016 EP_{181}	—	September 15, 2013	Haleakala	Pan-STARRS 1	·	1.2 km	MPC · JPL
594028	2016 EH_{182}	—	January 13, 2005	Kitt Peak	Spacewatch	·	780 m	MPC · JPL
594029	2016 EA_{186}	—	November 17, 2007	Mount Lemmon	Mount Lemmon Survey	·	880 m	MPC · JPL
594030	2016 ET_{197}	—	August 15, 2006	Palomar	NEAT	·	1.1 km	MPC · JPL
594031	2016 EB_{198}	—	January 8, 2016	Haleakala	Pan-STARRS 1	·	760 m	MPC · JPL
594032 Reyhersamuel	2016 EF_{201}	Reyhersamuel	April 1, 2003	Palomar	NEAT	BAR	1.3 km	MPC · JPL
594033	2016 EF_{202}	—	July 25, 2014	Haleakala	Pan-STARRS 1	·	630 m	MPC · JPL
594034	2016 EZ_{209}	—	March 5, 2016	Haleakala	Pan-STARRS 1	MAR	900 m	MPC · JPL
594035	2016 EK_{210}	—	March 7, 2016	Haleakala	Pan-STARRS 1	·	810 m	MPC · JPL
594036	2016 ET_{210}	—	September 23, 2013	Mount Lemmon	Mount Lemmon Survey	·	1.3 km	MPC · JPL
594037	2016 EZ_{213}	—	April 26, 2001	Kitt Peak	Spacewatch	MAS	540 m	MPC · JPL
594038	2016 EK_{217}	—	March 10, 2016	Haleakala	Pan-STARRS 1	·	940 m	MPC · JPL
594039	2016 ER_{220}	—	October 10, 2007	Mount Lemmon	Mount Lemmon Survey	·	770 m	MPC · JPL
594040	2016 EK_{222}	—	April 16, 2012	Kitt Peak	Spacewatch	EUN	860 m	MPC · JPL
594041	2016 EE_{223}	—	September 17, 2010	Mount Lemmon	Mount Lemmon Survey	V	490 m	MPC · JPL
594042	2016 EN_{223}	—	September 21, 2009	Mount Lemmon	Mount Lemmon Survey	·	680 m	MPC · JPL
594043	2016 EO_{223}	—	March 29, 2012	Haleakala	Pan-STARRS 1	·	790 m	MPC · JPL
594044	2016 EO_{228}	—	October 13, 2005	Kitt Peak	Spacewatch	·	960 m	MPC · JPL
594045	2016 EZ_{234}	—	May 19, 2012	Mount Lemmon	Mount Lemmon Survey	EUN	790 m	MPC · JPL
594046	2016 ED_{238}	—	December 2, 2010	Mount Lemmon	Mount Lemmon Survey	·	1.4 km	MPC · JPL
594047	2016 ET_{239}	—	February 10, 2011	Mount Lemmon	Mount Lemmon Survey	·	960 m	MPC · JPL
594048	2016 ET_{262}	—	March 6, 2016	Haleakala	Pan-STARRS 1	·	960 m	MPC · JPL
594049	2016 ES_{265}	—	November 10, 2010	Mount Lemmon	Mount Lemmon Survey	·	850 m	MPC · JPL
594050	2016 EW_{265}	—	March 7, 2016	Haleakala	Pan-STARRS 1	·	880 m	MPC · JPL
594051	2016 EB_{269}	—	March 10, 2016	Haleakala	Pan-STARRS 1	·	850 m	MPC · JPL
594052	2016 ED_{307}	—	March 5, 2016	Haleakala	Pan-STARRS 1	·	1.3 km	MPC · JPL
594053	2016 FL_{9}	—	October 6, 1999	Kitt Peak	Spacewatch	·	1.2 km	MPC · JPL
594054	2016 FK_{11}	—	September 10, 2007	Mount Lemmon	Mount Lemmon Survey	·	1.2 km	MPC · JPL
594055	2016 FH_{15}	—	September 7, 2004	Kitt Peak	Spacewatch	·	970 m	MPC · JPL
594056	2016 FZ_{16}	—	February 5, 2016	Haleakala	Pan-STARRS 1	·	820 m	MPC · JPL
594057	2016 FU_{18}	—	February 2, 2009	Catalina	CSS	·	850 m	MPC · JPL
594058	2016 FA_{19}	—	August 31, 2014	Kitt Peak	Spacewatch	·	880 m	MPC · JPL
594059	2016 FE_{23}	—	August 14, 2013	Haleakala	Pan-STARRS 1	MAS	720 m	MPC · JPL
594060	2016 FJ_{25}	—	April 1, 2005	Kitt Peak	Spacewatch	·	950 m	MPC · JPL
594061	2016 FO_{25}	—	January 10, 2008	Mount Lemmon	Mount Lemmon Survey	NYS	930 m	MPC · JPL
594062	2016 FZ_{25}	—	August 24, 2003	Cerro Tololo	Deep Ecliptic Survey	NYS	690 m	MPC · JPL
594063	2016 FS_{27}	—	October 16, 2007	Mount Lemmon	Mount Lemmon Survey	·	620 m	MPC · JPL
594064	2016 FA_{35}	—	September 3, 2013	Haleakala	Pan-STARRS 1	·	880 m	MPC · JPL
594065	2016 FO_{37}	—	February 7, 2008	Mount Lemmon	Mount Lemmon Survey	·	970 m	MPC · JPL
594066	2016 FY_{40}	—	January 6, 2012	Haleakala	Pan-STARRS 1	·	1.1 km	MPC · JPL
594067	2016 FO_{57}	—	July 15, 2013	Haleakala	Pan-STARRS 1	·	910 m	MPC · JPL
594068	2016 FF_{62}	—	April 24, 2012	Mount Lemmon	Mount Lemmon Survey	(194)	910 m	MPC · JPL
594069	2016 FJ_{62}	—	October 14, 2013	Mount Lemmon	Mount Lemmon Survey	EUN	960 m	MPC · JPL
594070	2016 FM_{62}	—	September 28, 2013	Mount Lemmon	Mount Lemmon Survey	·	1.6 km	MPC · JPL
594071	2016 FN_{63}	—	May 21, 2012	Mount Lemmon	Mount Lemmon Survey	·	1.2 km	MPC · JPL
594072	2016 FT_{64}	—	March 13, 2012	Mount Lemmon	Mount Lemmon Survey	PHO	880 m	MPC · JPL
594073	2016 FV_{64}	—	April 27, 2012	Kitt Peak	Spacewatch	·	1.2 km	MPC · JPL
594074	2016 FU_{69}	—	October 17, 2010	Mount Lemmon	Mount Lemmon Survey	L4	8.8 km	MPC · JPL
594075	2016 FE_{71}	—	March 19, 2016	Haleakala	Pan-STARRS 1	·	1.8 km	MPC · JPL
594076	2016 FW_{72}	—	March 17, 2016	Haleakala	Pan-STARRS 1	·	1.2 km	MPC · JPL
594077	2016 GO_{8}	—	March 23, 2012	Mount Lemmon	Mount Lemmon Survey	·	1.1 km	MPC · JPL
594078	2016 GS_{18}	—	April 21, 2009	Mount Lemmon	Mount Lemmon Survey	·	880 m	MPC · JPL
594079	2016 GO_{19}	—	March 10, 2016	Haleakala	Pan-STARRS 1	·	910 m	MPC · JPL
594080	2016 GQ_{29}	—	October 23, 2006	Catalina	CSS	PHO	1.2 km	MPC · JPL
594081	2016 GS_{37}	—	October 2, 1992	Kitt Peak	Spacewatch	·	810 m	MPC · JPL
594082	2016 GH_{43}	—	October 10, 2006	Palomar	NEAT	·	1.5 km	MPC · JPL
594083	2016 GT_{50}	—	March 27, 2012	Kitt Peak	Spacewatch	·	880 m	MPC · JPL
594084	2016 GV_{52}	—	July 14, 2013	Haleakala	Pan-STARRS 1	·	960 m	MPC · JPL
594085	2016 GV_{56}	—	November 9, 2007	Kitt Peak	Spacewatch	MAS	490 m	MPC · JPL
594086	2016 GA_{74}	—	January 13, 2015	Haleakala	Pan-STARRS 1	MAS	630 m	MPC · JPL
594087	2016 GL_{83}	—	January 27, 2012	Mount Lemmon	Mount Lemmon Survey	·	610 m	MPC · JPL
594088	2016 GX_{90}	—	April 1, 2016	Haleakala	Pan-STARRS 1	·	890 m	MPC · JPL
594089	2016 GF_{103}	—	April 27, 2012	Haleakala	Pan-STARRS 1	·	930 m	MPC · JPL
594090	2016 GT_{116}	—	December 25, 2010	Mount Lemmon	Mount Lemmon Survey	·	970 m	MPC · JPL
594091	2016 GD_{124}	—	February 16, 2007	Mount Lemmon	Mount Lemmon Survey	·	1.3 km	MPC · JPL
594092	2016 GW_{133}	—	January 27, 2007	Mount Lemmon	Mount Lemmon Survey	JUN	680 m	MPC · JPL
594093	2016 GA_{140}	—	May 16, 2009	Mount Lemmon	Mount Lemmon Survey	·	940 m	MPC · JPL
594094	2016 GL_{142}	—	August 31, 2014	Haleakala	Pan-STARRS 1	·	1.0 km	MPC · JPL
594095	2016 GQ_{143}	—	January 13, 2008	Kitt Peak	Spacewatch	·	1.4 km	MPC · JPL
594096	2016 GP_{150}	—	February 16, 2015	Haleakala	Pan-STARRS 1	L4 · ERY	6.6 km	MPC · JPL
594097	2016 GT_{151}	—	April 10, 2002	Palomar	NEAT	·	1.0 km	MPC · JPL
594098	2016 GQ_{158}	—	June 10, 2013	Mount Lemmon	Mount Lemmon Survey	·	1.2 km	MPC · JPL
594099	2016 GC_{159}	—	March 1, 2012	Mount Lemmon	Mount Lemmon Survey	·	990 m	MPC · JPL
594100	2016 GD_{159}	—	April 11, 2005	Mount Lemmon	Mount Lemmon Survey	·	1.5 km	MPC · JPL

== 594101–594200 ==
back to top

Designation			Discovery			Properties		Ref
Permanent	Provisional	Named after	Date	Site	Discoverer(s)	Category	Diam.	Ref
594101	2016 GN_{162}	—	August 30, 2014	Haleakala	Pan-STARRS 1	·	790 m	MPC · JPL
594102	2016 GB_{164}	—	December 3, 2014	Haleakala	Pan-STARRS 1	·	1.2 km	MPC · JPL
594103	2016 GK_{165}	—	March 6, 2000	Cerro Tololo	Deep Lens Survey	·	890 m	MPC · JPL
594104	2016 GA_{173}	—	March 29, 2008	Kitt Peak	Spacewatch	·	870 m	MPC · JPL
594105	2016 GA_{174}	—	January 19, 2007	Mauna Kea	P. A. Wiegert	·	770 m	MPC · JPL
594106	2016 GP_{175}	—	November 17, 2006	Mount Lemmon	Mount Lemmon Survey	·	1.6 km	MPC · JPL
594107	2016 GL_{184}	—	January 10, 2008	Mount Lemmon	Mount Lemmon Survey	·	1.2 km	MPC · JPL
594108	2016 GW_{186}	—	November 27, 2014	Haleakala	Pan-STARRS 1	V	570 m	MPC · JPL
594109	2016 GA_{188}	—	November 2, 2010	Mount Lemmon	Mount Lemmon Survey	L4	7.3 km	MPC · JPL
594110	2016 GM_{188}	—	February 3, 2008	Kitt Peak	Spacewatch	·	1.0 km	MPC · JPL
594111	2016 GE_{189}	—	April 21, 2012	Haleakala	Pan-STARRS 1	·	890 m	MPC · JPL
594112	2016 GV_{189}	—	May 21, 2012	Haleakala	Pan-STARRS 1	·	970 m	MPC · JPL
594113	2016 GW_{190}	—	May 25, 2003	Kitt Peak	Spacewatch	·	1.1 km	MPC · JPL
594114	2016 GO_{191}	—	March 11, 2007	Kitt Peak	Spacewatch	·	1.2 km	MPC · JPL
594115	2016 GQ_{191}	—	February 7, 2007	Mount Lemmon	Mount Lemmon Survey	·	1.2 km	MPC · JPL
594116	2016 GJ_{195}	—	February 24, 2012	Mount Lemmon	Mount Lemmon Survey	·	900 m	MPC · JPL
594117	2016 GE_{198}	—	April 4, 2016	Mount Lemmon	Mount Lemmon Survey	·	1.2 km	MPC · JPL
594118	2016 GZ_{203}	—	August 16, 2009	La Sagra	OAM	NYS	1.4 km	MPC · JPL
594119	2016 GA_{205}	—	June 13, 2005	Mount Lemmon	Mount Lemmon Survey	·	1.0 km	MPC · JPL
594120	2016 GH_{206}	—	July 27, 2004	Siding Spring	SSS	·	1.6 km	MPC · JPL
594121	2016 GP_{211}	—	October 31, 2010	Mount Lemmon	Mount Lemmon Survey	·	860 m	MPC · JPL
594122	2016 GZ_{213}	—	March 13, 2012	Mount Lemmon	Mount Lemmon Survey	MAS	560 m	MPC · JPL
594123	2016 GE_{214}	—	February 28, 2012	Haleakala	Pan-STARRS 1	·	1.2 km	MPC · JPL
594124	2016 GM_{223}	—	February 6, 2007	Mount Lemmon	Mount Lemmon Survey	·	1.1 km	MPC · JPL
594125	2016 GZ_{235}	—	April 14, 2016	Haleakala	Pan-STARRS 1	·	1.3 km	MPC · JPL
594126	2016 GN_{236}	—	March 31, 2003	Apache Point	SDSS Collaboration	L4	8.5 km	MPC · JPL
594127	2016 GS_{237}	—	April 14, 2016	Haleakala	Pan-STARRS 1	·	1.1 km	MPC · JPL
594128	2016 GB_{242}	—	May 8, 2008	Kitt Peak	Spacewatch	·	1.1 km	MPC · JPL
594129	2016 GX_{242}	—	February 15, 2012	Haleakala	Pan-STARRS 1	·	900 m	MPC · JPL
594130	2016 GB_{244}	—	October 17, 2010	Mount Lemmon	Mount Lemmon Survey	·	960 m	MPC · JPL
594131	2016 GY_{246}	—	October 22, 2005	Kitt Peak	Spacewatch	MAR	700 m	MPC · JPL
594132	2016 GJ_{257}	—	October 5, 2013	Mount Lemmon	Mount Lemmon Survey	·	930 m	MPC · JPL
594133	2016 GM_{258}	—	April 26, 2007	Mount Lemmon	Mount Lemmon Survey	·	1.9 km	MPC · JPL
594134	2016 GB_{260}	—	April 29, 2012	Kitt Peak	Spacewatch	·	780 m	MPC · JPL
594135	2016 GO_{260}	—	April 5, 2016	Haleakala	Pan-STARRS 1	·	1.4 km	MPC · JPL
594136	2016 GJ_{265}	—	March 10, 2007	Mount Lemmon	Mount Lemmon Survey	·	1.2 km	MPC · JPL
594137	2016 GY_{265}	—	January 20, 2015	Mount Lemmon	Mount Lemmon Survey	·	1.3 km	MPC · JPL
594138	2016 GQ_{268}	—	April 5, 2016	Haleakala	Pan-STARRS 1	(194)	1.1 km	MPC · JPL
594139	2016 GH_{269}	—	August 26, 2000	Kitt Peak	Spacewatch	·	1.1 km	MPC · JPL
594140	2016 GK_{278}	—	April 5, 2016	Haleakala	Pan-STARRS 1	·	1.4 km	MPC · JPL
594141	2016 GY_{278}	—	April 14, 2016	Haleakala	Pan-STARRS 1	·	940 m	MPC · JPL
594142	2016 GW_{281}	—	April 1, 2016	Mount Lemmon	Mount Lemmon Survey	NYS	800 m	MPC · JPL
594143	2016 GL_{282}	—	November 29, 2014	Kitt Peak	Spacewatch	·	980 m	MPC · JPL
594144	2016 GR_{305}	—	April 5, 2016	Haleakala	Pan-STARRS 1	·	1.1 km	MPC · JPL
594145	2016 HM_{7}	—	May 16, 2012	Mount Lemmon	Mount Lemmon Survey	·	1.1 km	MPC · JPL
594146	2016 HY_{15}	—	February 2, 2012	Bergisch Gladbach	W. Bickel	·	1.3 km	MPC · JPL
594147	2016 HM_{16}	—	February 3, 1995	Kitt Peak	Spacewatch	·	1.2 km	MPC · JPL
594148	2016 HM_{18}	—	July 30, 2000	Cerro Tololo	Deep Ecliptic Survey	·	1.0 km	MPC · JPL
594149	2016 HM_{21}	—	February 27, 2012	Catalina	CSS	·	1.3 km	MPC · JPL
594150	2016 HM_{28}	—	March 25, 2015	Haleakala	Pan-STARRS 1	L4	7.4 km	MPC · JPL
594151	2016 JO_{1}	—	March 6, 2016	Haleakala	Pan-STARRS 1	·	1.0 km	MPC · JPL
594152	2016 JS_{2}	—	March 5, 2016	Haleakala	Pan-STARRS 1	·	860 m	MPC · JPL
594153	2016 JC_{4}	—	December 29, 2014	Haleakala	Pan-STARRS 1	·	1.2 km	MPC · JPL
594154	2016 JU_{6}	—	February 10, 2016	Haleakala	Pan-STARRS 1	·	960 m	MPC · JPL
594155	2016 JB_{8}	—	March 17, 2016	Haleakala	Pan-STARRS 1	JUN	1.1 km	MPC · JPL
594156	2016 JW_{8}	—	May 21, 2012	Mount Lemmon	Mount Lemmon Survey	BRG	1.4 km	MPC · JPL
594157	2016 JY_{8}	—	January 29, 2012	Mount Lemmon	Mount Lemmon Survey	·	860 m	MPC · JPL
594158	2016 JM_{10}	—	September 21, 2009	Catalina	CSS	·	1.1 km	MPC · JPL
594159	2016 JC_{11}	—	March 4, 2016	Haleakala	Pan-STARRS 1	·	1.4 km	MPC · JPL
594160	2016 JS_{14}	—	May 19, 2004	Kitt Peak	Spacewatch	·	1.0 km	MPC · JPL
594161	2016 JE_{15}	—	May 18, 2012	Mount Lemmon	Mount Lemmon Survey	·	1.1 km	MPC · JPL
594162	2016 JD_{16}	—	February 27, 2012	Haleakala	Pan-STARRS 1	V	540 m	MPC · JPL
594163	2016 JC_{22}	—	October 28, 2005	Mount Lemmon	Mount Lemmon Survey	·	1.2 km	MPC · JPL
594164	2016 JJ_{26}	—	September 25, 2006	Mount Lemmon	Mount Lemmon Survey	·	1.2 km	MPC · JPL
594165	2016 JG_{31}	—	October 12, 2005	Kitt Peak	Spacewatch	·	2.0 km	MPC · JPL
594166	2016 JU_{31}	—	April 21, 2003	Kitt Peak	Spacewatch	·	1.1 km	MPC · JPL
594167	2016 JB_{33}	—	May 20, 2012	Mount Lemmon	Mount Lemmon Survey	·	1.3 km	MPC · JPL
594168	2016 JT_{37}	—	July 18, 2012	Catalina	CSS	·	1.3 km	MPC · JPL
594169	2016 JY_{37}	—	April 4, 2016	Haleakala	Pan-STARRS 1	·	990 m	MPC · JPL
594170	2016 JK_{41}	—	May 3, 2016	Mount Lemmon	Mount Lemmon Survey	·	970 m	MPC · JPL
594171	2016 JO_{41}	—	September 3, 2013	Haleakala	Pan-STARRS 1	·	1.0 km	MPC · JPL
594172	2016 JF_{43}	—	May 6, 2016	Haleakala	Pan-STARRS 1	EUN	870 m	MPC · JPL
594173	2016 JH_{44}	—	May 15, 2016	Haleakala	Pan-STARRS 1	·	1.2 km	MPC · JPL
594174	2016 JT_{45}	—	May 6, 2016	Haleakala	Pan-STARRS 1	·	910 m	MPC · JPL
594175	2016 JB_{46}	—	May 3, 2016	Mount Lemmon	Mount Lemmon Survey	·	1.0 km	MPC · JPL
594176	2016 JW_{52}	—	May 3, 2016	Haleakala	Pan-STARRS 1	EUN	1.0 km	MPC · JPL
594177	2016 KS_{2}	—	March 18, 2016	Haleakala	Pan-STARRS 1	·	1.4 km	MPC · JPL
594178	2016 KP_{3}	—	November 26, 2014	Haleakala	Pan-STARRS 1	·	1.9 km	MPC · JPL
594179	2016 KK_{9}	—	December 28, 2014	Mount Lemmon	Mount Lemmon Survey	·	850 m	MPC · JPL
594180	2016 LU_{1}	—	September 14, 2007	Catalina	CSS	·	3.2 km	MPC · JPL
594181	2016 LJ_{4}	—	October 3, 2013	Mount Lemmon	Mount Lemmon Survey	HNS	1.1 km	MPC · JPL
594182	2016 LO_{5}	—	January 12, 2013	Bergisch Gladbach	W. Bickel	L4	8.2 km	MPC · JPL
594183	2016 LG_{6}	—	April 11, 2016	Haleakala	Pan-STARRS 1	EUN	760 m	MPC · JPL
594184	2016 LY_{6}	—	June 14, 2012	Mount Lemmon	Mount Lemmon Survey	·	1.3 km	MPC · JPL
594185	2016 LJ_{13}	—	September 11, 2007	Mount Lemmon	Mount Lemmon Survey	L4	10 km	MPC · JPL
594186	2016 LW_{14}	—	May 13, 2012	Mount Lemmon	Mount Lemmon Survey	MAR	960 m	MPC · JPL
594187	2016 LR_{16}	—	January 22, 2015	Haleakala	Pan-STARRS 1	·	960 m	MPC · JPL
594188	2016 LZ_{20}	—	March 20, 2015	Haleakala	Pan-STARRS 1	EUN	1.0 km	MPC · JPL
594189	2016 LE_{32}	—	October 23, 2013	Mount Lemmon	Mount Lemmon Survey	·	1.0 km	MPC · JPL
594190	2016 LG_{32}	—	March 12, 2007	Catalina	CSS	·	2.0 km	MPC · JPL
594191	2016 LC_{34}	—	June 5, 2016	Haleakala	Pan-STARRS 1	·	1.1 km	MPC · JPL
594192	2016 LH_{34}	—	June 5, 2016	Haleakala	Pan-STARRS 1	·	1.1 km	MPC · JPL
594193	2016 LA_{38}	—	September 14, 2013	Haleakala	Pan-STARRS 1	·	820 m	MPC · JPL
594194	2016 LB_{39}	—	June 5, 2016	Haleakala	Pan-STARRS 1	·	1.4 km	MPC · JPL
594195	2016 LU_{41}	—	May 30, 2016	Haleakala	Pan-STARRS 1	·	1.3 km	MPC · JPL
594196	2016 LM_{50}	—	June 2, 2016	Mount Lemmon	Mount Lemmon Survey	EUN	1.0 km	MPC · JPL
594197	2016 LL_{56}	—	June 7, 2016	Haleakala	Pan-STARRS 1	KON	1.8 km	MPC · JPL
594198	2016 LN_{57}	—	August 26, 2012	Siding Spring	SSS	·	1.6 km	MPC · JPL
594199	2016 LR_{57}	—	March 2, 2006	Kitt Peak	Spacewatch	AEO	1.0 km	MPC · JPL
594200	2016 LM_{58}	—	December 6, 2008	Kitt Peak	Spacewatch	·	2.0 km	MPC · JPL

== 594201–594300 ==
back to top

Designation			Discovery			Properties		Ref
Permanent	Provisional	Named after	Date	Site	Discoverer(s)	Category	Diam.	Ref
594201	2016 LW_{58}	—	June 8, 2016	Haleakala	Pan-STARRS 1	MAR	880 m	MPC · JPL
594202	2016 LD_{59}	—	June 9, 2016	Haleakala	Pan-STARRS 1	MAR	850 m	MPC · JPL
594203	2016 LM_{59}	—	January 17, 2015	Haleakala	Pan-STARRS 1	·	1.2 km	MPC · JPL
594204	2016 LV_{63}	—	September 16, 2012	Kitt Peak	Spacewatch	AGN	1.0 km	MPC · JPL
594205	2016 LX_{63}	—	November 6, 2008	Kitt Peak	Spacewatch	·	1.7 km	MPC · JPL
594206	2016 LE_{64}	—	September 21, 2012	Mount Lemmon	Mount Lemmon Survey	·	1.7 km	MPC · JPL
594207	2016 LJ_{64}	—	May 6, 2011	Kitt Peak	Spacewatch	·	1.5 km	MPC · JPL
594208	2016 LY_{64}	—	February 1, 2003	Palomar	NEAT	·	1.5 km	MPC · JPL
594209	2016 LM_{78}	—	June 8, 2016	Mount Lemmon	Mount Lemmon Survey	·	990 m	MPC · JPL
594210	2016 MF_{2}	—	November 9, 2013	Mount Lemmon	Mount Lemmon Survey	·	990 m	MPC · JPL
594211	2016 MO_{2}	—	June 2, 2016	Mount Lemmon	Mount Lemmon Survey	·	1 km	MPC · JPL
594212	2016 MZ_{4}	—	June 23, 2016	Haleakala	Pan-STARRS 1	·	1.5 km	MPC · JPL
594213	2016 NM_{2}	—	October 3, 2013	Kitt Peak	Spacewatch	(194)	1.5 km	MPC · JPL
594214	2016 NV_{2}	—	July 3, 2016	Space Surveillance	Space Surveillance Telescope	·	1.7 km	MPC · JPL
594215	2016 NW_{2}	—	September 29, 2008	Mount Lemmon	Mount Lemmon Survey	·	1.9 km	MPC · JPL
594216	2016 NB_{6}	—	January 16, 2005	Mauna Kea	Veillet, C.	·	1.5 km	MPC · JPL
594217	2016 NJ_{6}	—	June 8, 2016	Mount Lemmon	Mount Lemmon Survey	DOR	1.9 km	MPC · JPL
594218	2016 NY_{8}	—	April 1, 2003	Palomar	NEAT	·	1.4 km	MPC · JPL
594219	2016 NH_{9}	—	June 16, 1996	Kitt Peak	Spacewatch	·	1.4 km	MPC · JPL
594220	2016 NO_{9}	—	September 14, 2012	Catalina	CSS	·	1.7 km	MPC · JPL
594221	2016 NK_{10}	—	July 4, 2016	Haleakala	Pan-STARRS 1	·	1.6 km	MPC · JPL
594222	2016 NR_{14}	—	May 8, 2011	Mount Lemmon	Mount Lemmon Survey	·	1.3 km	MPC · JPL
594223	2016 ND_{19}	—	November 1, 2008	Mount Lemmon	Mount Lemmon Survey	·	1.8 km	MPC · JPL
594224	2016 NG_{20}	—	January 16, 2015	Haleakala	Pan-STARRS 1	·	1.3 km	MPC · JPL
594225	2016 NP_{21}	—	July 15, 2012	Mayhill-ISON	L. Elenin	BAR	1.1 km	MPC · JPL
594226	2016 NR_{24}	—	November 28, 2013	Mount Lemmon	Mount Lemmon Survey	EUN	1.5 km	MPC · JPL
594227	2016 NB_{26}	—	October 1, 2003	Kitt Peak	Spacewatch	·	1.3 km	MPC · JPL
594228	2016 NL_{30}	—	September 5, 2007	Anderson Mesa	LONEOS	·	1.7 km	MPC · JPL
594229	2016 NJ_{31}	—	November 19, 2007	Kitt Peak	Spacewatch	·	1.6 km	MPC · JPL
594230	2016 NL_{31}	—	October 21, 2012	Kitt Peak	Spacewatch	MRX	900 m	MPC · JPL
594231	2016 NB_{35}	—	December 24, 2013	Mount Lemmon	Mount Lemmon Survey	·	1.4 km	MPC · JPL
594232	2016 NK_{41}	—	March 17, 2015	Haleakala	Pan-STARRS 1	·	1 km	MPC · JPL
594233	2016 NS_{47}	—	September 25, 2012	Mount Lemmon	Mount Lemmon Survey	·	1.5 km	MPC · JPL
594234	2016 NS_{52}	—	October 8, 2012	Kitt Peak	Spacewatch	MRX	710 m	MPC · JPL
594235	2016 NG_{53}	—	June 8, 2016	Haleakala	Pan-STARRS 1	·	1.5 km	MPC · JPL
594236	2016 NS_{54}	—	November 23, 2003	Kitt Peak	Spacewatch	·	2.0 km	MPC · JPL
594237	2016 NB_{58}	—	March 30, 2008	Kitt Peak	Spacewatch	H	350 m	MPC · JPL
594238	2016 NH_{66}	—	January 28, 2015	Haleakala	Pan-STARRS 1	(18466)	1.8 km	MPC · JPL
594239	2016 NX_{67}	—	July 3, 2016	Mount Lemmon	Mount Lemmon Survey	HOF	1.8 km	MPC · JPL
594240	2016 NL_{68}	—	September 18, 2007	Goodricke-Pigott	R. A. Tucker	·	2.0 km	MPC · JPL
594241	2016 NC_{69}	—	October 17, 2012	Haleakala	Pan-STARRS 1	·	1.4 km	MPC · JPL
594242	2016 NE_{69}	—	September 10, 2007	Mount Lemmon	Mount Lemmon Survey	·	1.5 km	MPC · JPL
594243	2016 NM_{73}	—	July 11, 2016	Haleakala	Pan-STARRS 1	MAR	970 m	MPC · JPL
594244	2016 NB_{75}	—	July 6, 2016	Mount Lemmon	Mount Lemmon Survey	·	1.8 km	MPC · JPL
594245	2016 NJ_{77}	—	January 15, 2009	Kitt Peak	Spacewatch	GEF	1.0 km	MPC · JPL
594246	2016 NP_{78}	—	February 10, 2002	Socorro	LINEAR	·	1.5 km	MPC · JPL
594247	2016 NC_{81}	—	November 26, 2012	Mount Lemmon	Mount Lemmon Survey	DOR	2.0 km	MPC · JPL
594248	2016 NY_{82}	—	July 17, 2001	Anderson Mesa	LONEOS	·	2.4 km	MPC · JPL
594249	2016 NM_{83}	—	April 24, 2015	Haleakala	Pan-STARRS 1	HOF	2.0 km	MPC · JPL
594250	2016 NH_{87}	—	February 16, 2015	Haleakala	Pan-STARRS 1	·	1.3 km	MPC · JPL
594251	2016 NY_{87}	—	September 26, 2012	Nogales	M. Schwartz, P. R. Holvorcem	EUN	1.0 km	MPC · JPL
594252	2016 NW_{93}	—	July 3, 2016	Mount Lemmon	Mount Lemmon Survey	·	1.6 km	MPC · JPL
594253	2016 NV_{115}	—	July 3, 2016	Mount Lemmon	Mount Lemmon Survey	EUN	980 m	MPC · JPL
594254	2016 NW_{118}	—	July 1, 2016	Haleakala	Pan-STARRS 1	EUN	910 m	MPC · JPL
594255	2016 NF_{119}	—	July 14, 2016	Haleakala	Pan-STARRS 1	·	1.2 km	MPC · JPL
594256	2016 NZ_{130}	—	July 7, 2016	Haleakala	Pan-STARRS 1	NAE	1.7 km	MPC · JPL
594257	2016 NX_{140}	—	June 21, 2012	Mount Lemmon	Mount Lemmon Survey	MAR	1.0 km	MPC · JPL
594258	2016 NV_{148}	—	July 10, 2016	Mount Lemmon	Mount Lemmon Survey	·	1.7 km	MPC · JPL
594259	2016 OT_{1}	—	June 8, 2007	Kitt Peak	Spacewatch	·	1.4 km	MPC · JPL
594260	2016 OB_{4}	—	July 27, 2011	Haleakala	Pan-STARRS 1	·	1.4 km	MPC · JPL
594261	2016 OS_{7}	—	September 3, 2005	Palomar	NEAT	·	2.4 km	MPC · JPL
594262	2016 PO_{1}	—	April 3, 2011	Siding Spring	SSS	·	2.5 km	MPC · JPL
594263	2016 PY_{3}	—	September 20, 2011	Haleakala	Pan-STARRS 1	·	2.1 km	MPC · JPL
594264	2016 PQ_{4}	—	October 18, 2012	Haleakala	Pan-STARRS 1	HOF	1.9 km	MPC · JPL
594265	2016 PJ_{8}	—	August 23, 2008	Siding Spring	SSS	(116763)	1.6 km	MPC · JPL
594266	2016 PX_{10}	—	August 2, 2016	Haleakala	Pan-STARRS 1	·	1.6 km	MPC · JPL
594267	2016 PT_{15}	—	June 8, 2016	Haleakala	Pan-STARRS 1	·	1.3 km	MPC · JPL
594268	2016 PD_{16}	—	March 25, 2015	Haleakala	Pan-STARRS 1	·	1.3 km	MPC · JPL
594269	2016 PU_{17}	—	February 9, 2005	Kitt Peak	Spacewatch	·	1.4 km	MPC · JPL
594270	2016 PW_{18}	—	January 5, 2010	Kitt Peak	Spacewatch	HNS	1.0 km	MPC · JPL
594271	2016 PS_{19}	—	December 28, 2013	Mayhill-ISON	L. Elenin	DOR	1.9 km	MPC · JPL
594272	2016 PL_{21}	—	December 23, 2000	Kitt Peak	Spacewatch	·	1.4 km	MPC · JPL
594273	2016 PG_{22}	—	August 7, 2016	Haleakala	Pan-STARRS 1	HOF	2.0 km	MPC · JPL
594274	2016 PF_{24}	—	February 9, 2005	Mount Lemmon	Mount Lemmon Survey	·	1.5 km	MPC · JPL
594275	2016 PN_{24}	—	August 2, 2016	Haleakala	Pan-STARRS 1	(5)	990 m	MPC · JPL
594276	2016 PL_{25}	—	October 22, 2003	Apache Point	SDSS Collaboration	·	1.5 km	MPC · JPL
594277	2016 PY_{27}	—	October 8, 2004	Kitt Peak	Spacewatch	·	1.3 km	MPC · JPL
594278	2016 PO_{29}	—	April 20, 2010	Mount Lemmon	Mount Lemmon Survey	·	1.5 km	MPC · JPL
594279	2016 PB_{32}	—	May 24, 2015	Haleakala	Pan-STARRS 1	·	2.0 km	MPC · JPL
594280	2016 PP_{33}	—	October 22, 2009	Kitt Peak	Spacewatch	·	1.3 km	MPC · JPL
594281	2016 PX_{34}	—	October 8, 2012	Haleakala	Pan-STARRS 1	·	1.7 km	MPC · JPL
594282	2016 PV_{43}	—	March 25, 2007	Mount Lemmon	Mount Lemmon Survey	·	1.4 km	MPC · JPL
594283	2016 PX_{43}	—	February 6, 2014	Catalina	CSS	·	2.0 km	MPC · JPL
594284	2016 PP_{49}	—	September 21, 2012	Kitt Peak	Spacewatch	·	1.8 km	MPC · JPL
594285	2016 PV_{53}	—	June 11, 2002	Palomar	NEAT	·	2.1 km	MPC · JPL
594286	2016 PY_{55}	—	January 11, 2014	Haleakala	Pan-STARRS 1	BAR	1.0 km	MPC · JPL
594287	2016 PW_{67}	—	May 1, 2008	Siding Spring	SSS	·	4.5 km	MPC · JPL
594288	2016 PD_{76}	—	May 18, 2015	Mount Lemmon	Mount Lemmon Survey	DOR	2.0 km	MPC · JPL
594289	2016 PR_{78}	—	September 2, 2011	Haleakala	Pan-STARRS 1	·	2.0 km	MPC · JPL
594290	2016 PA_{87}	—	August 10, 2016	Haleakala	Pan-STARRS 1	·	1.6 km	MPC · JPL
594291	2016 PK_{92}	—	September 4, 2011	Haleakala	Pan-STARRS 1	·	1.4 km	MPC · JPL
594292	2016 PU_{92}	—	November 7, 2012	Haleakala	Pan-STARRS 1	KOR	1 km	MPC · JPL
594293	2016 PH_{95}	—	April 6, 2008	Mount Lemmon	Mount Lemmon Survey	VER	2.2 km	MPC · JPL
594294	2016 PL_{97}	—	October 9, 2008	Mount Lemmon	Mount Lemmon Survey	·	1.7 km	MPC · JPL
594295	2016 PL_{99}	—	January 26, 2009	Mount Lemmon	Mount Lemmon Survey	·	1.5 km	MPC · JPL
594296	2016 PJ_{102}	—	December 11, 2001	Kitt Peak	Spacewatch	·	1.8 km	MPC · JPL
594297	2016 PP_{104}	—	August 24, 2007	Kitt Peak	Spacewatch	·	1.6 km	MPC · JPL
594298	2016 PA_{111}	—	January 29, 2014	Catalina	CSS	·	2.5 km	MPC · JPL
594299	2016 PG_{113}	—	September 21, 2011	Mount Lemmon	Mount Lemmon Survey	·	1.9 km	MPC · JPL
594300	2016 PQ_{114}	—	May 23, 2001	Cerro Tololo	Deep Ecliptic Survey	KOR	1.3 km	MPC · JPL

== 594301–594400 ==
back to top

Designation			Discovery			Properties		Ref
Permanent	Provisional	Named after	Date	Site	Discoverer(s)	Category	Diam.	Ref
594301	2016 PQ_{117}	—	September 21, 2011	Mount Lemmon	Mount Lemmon Survey	·	1.3 km	MPC · JPL
594302	2016 PC_{118}	—	November 7, 2012	Haleakala	Pan-STARRS 1	·	1.8 km	MPC · JPL
594303	2016 PZ_{119}	—	January 19, 2013	Kitt Peak	Spacewatch	·	2.8 km	MPC · JPL
594304	2016 PA_{125}	—	October 31, 2011	Mount Lemmon	Mount Lemmon Survey	·	1.7 km	MPC · JPL
594305	2016 PU_{125}	—	August 12, 2016	Haleakala	Pan-STARRS 1	·	2.7 km	MPC · JPL
594306	2016 PW_{128}	—	January 14, 2002	Palomar	NEAT	·	1.9 km	MPC · JPL
594307	2016 PA_{152}	—	August 2, 2016	Haleakala	Pan-STARRS 1	·	1.7 km	MPC · JPL
594308	2016 PZ_{166}	—	August 2, 2016	Haleakala	Pan-STARRS 1	EMA	2.3 km	MPC · JPL
594309	2016 QL_{9}	—	July 27, 2011	Haleakala	Pan-STARRS 1	·	1.9 km	MPC · JPL
594310	2016 QZ_{9}	—	October 21, 2006	Mount Lemmon	Mount Lemmon Survey	·	1.5 km	MPC · JPL
594311	2016 QQ_{10}	—	February 15, 2010	Mount Lemmon	Mount Lemmon Survey	H	260 m	MPC · JPL
594312	2016 QL_{13}	—	October 19, 2003	Apache Point	SDSS Collaboration	WIT	1.1 km	MPC · JPL
594313	2016 QM_{18}	—	October 15, 2012	Kitt Peak	Spacewatch	·	3.0 km	MPC · JPL
594314	2016 QU_{21}	—	April 1, 2014	Mount Lemmon	Mount Lemmon Survey	·	1.8 km	MPC · JPL
594315	2016 QH_{22}	—	October 11, 2007	Mount Lemmon	Mount Lemmon Survey	·	1.7 km	MPC · JPL
594316	2016 QY_{24}	—	August 2, 2011	Haleakala	Pan-STARRS 1	·	1.8 km	MPC · JPL
594317	2016 QP_{29}	—	October 29, 2003	Kitt Peak	Spacewatch	NEM	2.3 km	MPC · JPL
594318	2016 QD_{30}	—	December 29, 2008	Mount Lemmon	Mount Lemmon Survey	·	1.7 km	MPC · JPL
594319	2016 QF_{30}	—	May 22, 2015	Haleakala	Pan-STARRS 1	·	1.3 km	MPC · JPL
594320	2016 QJ_{37}	—	September 19, 2012	Mount Lemmon	Mount Lemmon Survey	HOF	2.5 km	MPC · JPL
594321	2016 QU_{38}	—	May 6, 2006	Mount Lemmon	Mount Lemmon Survey	·	1.8 km	MPC · JPL
594322	2016 QB_{39}	—	February 18, 2015	Haleakala	Pan-STARRS 1	·	1.9 km	MPC · JPL
594323	2016 QK_{48}	—	October 9, 2007	Lulin	LUSS	GEF	1.0 km	MPC · JPL
594324	2016 QD_{49}	—	September 20, 2011	Catalina	CSS	·	1.7 km	MPC · JPL
594325	2016 QA_{54}	—	August 28, 2016	Mount Lemmon	Mount Lemmon Survey	·	1.4 km	MPC · JPL
594326	2016 QU_{54}	—	March 18, 2010	Mount Lemmon	Mount Lemmon Survey	·	2.0 km	MPC · JPL
594327	2016 QL_{63}	—	August 10, 2007	Kitt Peak	Spacewatch	MRX	920 m	MPC · JPL
594328	2016 QJ_{68}	—	September 9, 2007	Mount Lemmon	Mount Lemmon Survey	·	1.6 km	MPC · JPL
594329	2016 QW_{71}	—	November 11, 2013	Mount Lemmon	Mount Lemmon Survey	·	740 m	MPC · JPL
594330	2016 QZ_{73}	—	October 9, 2002	Kitt Peak	Spacewatch	AGN	1.3 km	MPC · JPL
594331	2016 QA_{75}	—	July 8, 2005	Kitt Peak	Spacewatch	·	1.9 km	MPC · JPL
594332	2016 QT_{76}	—	March 18, 2015	Haleakala	Pan-STARRS 1	JUN	830 m	MPC · JPL
594333	2016 QY_{76}	—	August 2, 2011	Haleakala	Pan-STARRS 1	·	2.1 km	MPC · JPL
594334	2016 QY_{81}	—	September 12, 2007	Catalina	CSS	·	2.6 km	MPC · JPL
594335	2016 QE_{83}	—	August 3, 2016	Haleakala	Pan-STARRS 1	·	2.0 km	MPC · JPL
594336	2016 QA_{85}	—	December 18, 2009	Mount Lemmon	Mount Lemmon Survey	·	2.1 km	MPC · JPL
594337	2016 QU_{89}	—	August 25, 2016	Cerro Tololo-DECam	DECam	SDO	100 km	MPC · JPL
594338	2016 QV_{90}	—	August 27, 2005	Palomar	NEAT	·	2.2 km	MPC · JPL
594339	2016 QZ_{94}	—	October 23, 2012	Haleakala	Pan-STARRS 1	·	1.4 km	MPC · JPL
594340	2016 QH_{95}	—	February 25, 2014	Haleakala	Pan-STARRS 1	GAL	1.3 km	MPC · JPL
594341	2016 QB_{106}	—	December 25, 2006	Kitt Peak	Spacewatch	·	3.0 km	MPC · JPL
594342	2016 QC_{113}	—	August 27, 2016	Haleakala	Pan-STARRS 1	EOS	1.6 km	MPC · JPL
594343	2016 RP_{2}	—	August 30, 2016	Mount Lemmon	Mount Lemmon Survey	H	230 m	MPC · JPL
594344	2016 RK_{15}	—	October 18, 2012	Mount Lemmon	Mount Lemmon Survey	·	1.9 km	MPC · JPL
594345	2016 RX_{15}	—	August 26, 2011	Piszkés-tető	K. Sárneczky, S. Kürti	BRA	1.4 km	MPC · JPL
594346	2016 RS_{16}	—	December 21, 2006	Kitt Peak	Spacewatch	EOS	2.0 km	MPC · JPL
594347	2016 RY_{22}	—	October 8, 2007	Mount Lemmon	Mount Lemmon Survey	·	1.3 km	MPC · JPL
594348	2016 RJ_{23}	—	September 27, 2002	Palomar	NEAT	TIN	850 m	MPC · JPL
594349	2016 RY_{28}	—	October 5, 2002	Palomar	NEAT	·	1.8 km	MPC · JPL
594350	2016 RY_{30}	—	August 27, 2011	Haleakala	Pan-STARRS 1	·	2.0 km	MPC · JPL
594351	2016 RH_{33}	—	July 11, 2005	Kitt Peak	Spacewatch	·	2.2 km	MPC · JPL
594352	2016 RK_{36}	—	December 22, 2012	Haleakala	Pan-STARRS 1	·	1.9 km	MPC · JPL
594353	2016 RC_{39}	—	November 3, 2011	Mount Lemmon	Mount Lemmon Survey	·	2.4 km	MPC · JPL
594354	2016 RH_{42}	—	September 19, 2011	Haleakala	Pan-STARRS 1	H	320 m	MPC · JPL
594355	2016 RM_{42}	—	March 16, 2007	Kitt Peak	Spacewatch	H	480 m	MPC · JPL
594356	2016 RC_{43}	—	January 4, 2013	Cerro Tololo-DECam	DECam	EOS	1.3 km	MPC · JPL
594357	2016 RE_{51}	—	September 3, 2016	Mount Lemmon	Mount Lemmon Survey	H	450 m	MPC · JPL
594358	2016 SB_{6}	—	August 15, 2002	Palomar	NEAT	·	2.4 km	MPC · JPL
594359	2016 SA_{10}	—	October 31, 2007	Mount Lemmon	Mount Lemmon Survey	·	1.7 km	MPC · JPL
594360	2016 SM_{11}	—	March 16, 2007	Kitt Peak	Spacewatch	H	430 m	MPC · JPL
594361	2016 SG_{15}	—	August 27, 2006	Kitt Peak	Spacewatch	·	1.5 km	MPC · JPL
594362	2016 ST_{16}	—	September 17, 2010	Mount Lemmon	Mount Lemmon Survey	·	2.9 km	MPC · JPL
594363	2016 SU_{16}	—	October 30, 2011	Mount Lemmon	Mount Lemmon Survey	·	2.4 km	MPC · JPL
594364	2016 SY_{19}	—	March 20, 2015	Haleakala	Pan-STARRS 1	H	430 m	MPC · JPL
594365	2016 SH_{21}	—	November 7, 2007	Catalina	CSS	·	2.1 km	MPC · JPL
594366	2016 SX_{28}	—	November 8, 2007	Kitt Peak	Spacewatch	KOR	1.8 km	MPC · JPL
594367	2016 SN_{30}	—	April 17, 2009	Kitt Peak	Spacewatch	·	1.9 km	MPC · JPL
594368	2016 SW_{34}	—	September 1, 2005	Palomar	NEAT	·	2.8 km	MPC · JPL
594369	2016 SY_{39}	—	October 21, 2011	Kitt Peak	Spacewatch	·	1.5 km	MPC · JPL
594370	2016 SW_{48}	—	August 30, 2016	Mount Lemmon	Mount Lemmon Survey	AGN	1.1 km	MPC · JPL
594371	2016 SA_{75}	—	September 25, 2016	Haleakala	Pan-STARRS 1	EOS	1.5 km	MPC · JPL
594372	2016 SV_{101}	—	September 26, 2016	Haleakala	Pan-STARRS 1	·	2.0 km	MPC · JPL
594373	2016 TE_{4}	—	September 28, 1997	Kitt Peak	Spacewatch	·	2.2 km	MPC · JPL
594374	2016 TG_{6}	—	October 14, 2007	Mount Lemmon	Mount Lemmon Survey	·	2.2 km	MPC · JPL
594375	2016 TS_{9}	—	April 10, 2013	Haleakala	Pan-STARRS 1	·	3.0 km	MPC · JPL
594376	2016 TP_{10}	—	December 18, 2009	Mount Lemmon	Mount Lemmon Survey	H	460 m	MPC · JPL
594377	2016 TL_{16}	—	July 29, 2000	Cerro Tololo	Deep Ecliptic Survey	·	1.5 km	MPC · JPL
594378	2016 TN_{16}	—	September 22, 2011	Catalina	CSS	·	3.2 km	MPC · JPL
594379	2016 TN_{23}	—	October 7, 2005	Mount Lemmon	Mount Lemmon Survey	·	2.2 km	MPC · JPL
594380	2016 TJ_{32}	—	September 22, 2016	Mount Lemmon	Mount Lemmon Survey	·	2.2 km	MPC · JPL
594381	2016 TX_{33}	—	May 2, 2006	Mount Lemmon	Mount Lemmon Survey	·	1.4 km	MPC · JPL
594382	2016 TY_{36}	—	January 17, 2013	Mount Lemmon	Mount Lemmon Survey	·	2.5 km	MPC · JPL
594383	2016 TV_{40}	—	May 22, 2015	Haleakala	Pan-STARRS 1	·	1.4 km	MPC · JPL
594384	2016 TN_{43}	—	September 18, 2006	Kitt Peak	Spacewatch	·	1.6 km	MPC · JPL
594385	2016 TC_{44}	—	August 30, 2005	Kitt Peak	Spacewatch	·	1.7 km	MPC · JPL
594386	2016 TY_{47}	—	November 4, 2007	Kitt Peak	Spacewatch	·	2.0 km	MPC · JPL
594387	2016 TQ_{49}	—	December 13, 2006	Mount Lemmon	Mount Lemmon Survey	EOS	1.5 km	MPC · JPL
594388	2016 TY_{49}	—	September 25, 2005	Kitt Peak	Spacewatch	·	2.2 km	MPC · JPL
594389	2016 TH_{54}	—	April 29, 2008	Mount Lemmon	Mount Lemmon Survey	·	3.3 km	MPC · JPL
594390	2016 TU_{55}	—	October 15, 2001	Socorro	LINEAR	H	600 m	MPC · JPL
594391	2016 TO_{57}	—	December 28, 2006	Piszkéstető	K. Sárneczky	·	2.7 km	MPC · JPL
594392	2016 TD_{61}	—	September 5, 2000	Apache Point	SDSS Collaboration	TEL	980 m	MPC · JPL
594393	2016 TC_{70}	—	August 10, 2016	Haleakala	Pan-STARRS 1	·	2.3 km	MPC · JPL
594394	2016 TK_{73}	—	March 31, 2008	Kitt Peak	Spacewatch	H	390 m	MPC · JPL
594395	2016 TQ_{77}	—	December 30, 2007	Kitt Peak	Spacewatch	·	1.8 km	MPC · JPL
594396	2016 TB_{78}	—	February 11, 2013	Nogales	M. Schwartz, P. R. Holvorcem	·	1.7 km	MPC · JPL
594397	2016 TB_{81}	—	October 10, 2007	Mount Lemmon	Mount Lemmon Survey	·	1.9 km	MPC · JPL
594398	2016 TT_{81}	—	September 21, 2011	Mount Lemmon	Mount Lemmon Survey	·	1.7 km	MPC · JPL
594399	2016 TJ_{82}	—	May 2, 2008	Catalina	CSS	·	3.3 km	MPC · JPL
594400	2016 TH_{83}	—	September 21, 2011	Mount Lemmon	Mount Lemmon Survey	·	1.6 km	MPC · JPL

== 594401–594500 ==
back to top

Designation			Discovery			Properties		Ref
Permanent	Provisional	Named after	Date	Site	Discoverer(s)	Category	Diam.	Ref
594401	2016 TD_{88}	—	March 13, 2013	Palomar	Palomar Transient Factory	·	2.7 km	MPC · JPL
594402	2016 TR_{91}	—	November 30, 2014	Haleakala	Pan-STARRS 1	H	500 m	MPC · JPL
594403	2016 TH_{92}	—	August 4, 2005	Palomar	NEAT	·	2.3 km	MPC · JPL
594404	2016 TP_{100}	—	October 21, 2007	Mount Lemmon	Mount Lemmon Survey	·	1.6 km	MPC · JPL
594405	2016 TP_{122}	—	October 12, 2016	Haleakala	Pan-STARRS 1	·	2.6 km	MPC · JPL
594406	2016 TB_{150}	—	October 12, 2016	Mount Lemmon	Mount Lemmon Survey	·	2.5 km	MPC · JPL
594407	2016 TY_{163}	—	October 12, 2016	Haleakala	Pan-STARRS 1	·	1.7 km	MPC · JPL
594408	2016 TN_{168}	—	October 8, 2016	Haleakala	Pan-STARRS 1	·	3.2 km	MPC · JPL
594409	2016 UB_{5}	—	September 23, 2011	Kitt Peak	Spacewatch	H	440 m	MPC · JPL
594410	2016 UR_{11}	—	October 25, 2011	Haleakala	Pan-STARRS 1	·	2.3 km	MPC · JPL
594411	2016 UG_{13}	—	February 29, 2008	Kanab	Sheridan, E.	·	2.0 km	MPC · JPL
594412	2016 UU_{16}	—	April 30, 2014	Haleakala	Pan-STARRS 1	EOS	1.5 km	MPC · JPL
594413	2016 UK_{18}	—	October 11, 2016	Mount Lemmon	Mount Lemmon Survey	·	1.9 km	MPC · JPL
594414	2016 UC_{20}	—	June 13, 2015	Haleakala	Pan-STARRS 1	·	2.5 km	MPC · JPL
594415	2016 UE_{24}	—	October 11, 2016	Mount Lemmon	Mount Lemmon Survey	·	1.6 km	MPC · JPL
594416	2016 UZ_{24}	—	October 19, 2006	Kitt Peak	Spacewatch	H	360 m	MPC · JPL
594417	2016 UE_{28}	—	August 25, 2000	Cerro Tololo	Deep Ecliptic Survey	·	1.5 km	MPC · JPL
594418	2016 UJ_{30}	—	April 6, 2008	Kitt Peak	Spacewatch	H	350 m	MPC · JPL
594419	2016 UB_{45}	—	July 4, 2005	Mount Lemmon	Mount Lemmon Survey	EOS	1.6 km	MPC · JPL
594420	2016 UZ_{45}	—	January 10, 2013	Haleakala	Pan-STARRS 1	EOS	1.9 km	MPC · JPL
594421	2016 UW_{47}	—	November 22, 2011	Mount Lemmon	Mount Lemmon Survey	·	2.5 km	MPC · JPL
594422	2016 UE_{49}	—	February 7, 2013	Kitt Peak	Spacewatch	·	2.5 km	MPC · JPL
594423	2016 UF_{50}	—	April 16, 2013	Cerro Tololo-DECam	DECam	·	2.0 km	MPC · JPL
594424	2016 UE_{52}	—	August 1, 2005	Mauna Kea	D. J. Tholen	·	2.8 km	MPC · JPL
594425	2016 UY_{59}	—	October 20, 2011	Mount Lemmon	Mount Lemmon Survey	·	1.8 km	MPC · JPL
594426	2016 UC_{66}	—	November 25, 2011	Haleakala	Pan-STARRS 1	·	2.2 km	MPC · JPL
594427	2016 UQ_{66}	—	February 24, 2014	Haleakala	Pan-STARRS 1	·	2.3 km	MPC · JPL
594428	2016 UN_{67}	—	August 31, 2005	Kitt Peak	Spacewatch	·	2.0 km	MPC · JPL
594429	2016 UB_{71}	—	October 10, 2016	Oukaïmeden	C. Rinner	EOS	1.6 km	MPC · JPL
594430	2016 UQ_{73}	—	October 21, 2006	Kitt Peak	Spacewatch	EOS	1.3 km	MPC · JPL
594431	2016 UR_{85}	—	August 26, 2005	Palomar	NEAT	·	1.7 km	MPC · JPL
594432	2016 US_{90}	—	October 13, 1999	Apache Point	SDSS Collaboration	·	2.8 km	MPC · JPL
594433	2016 UO_{94}	—	March 16, 2010	Kitt Peak	Spacewatch	·	1.4 km	MPC · JPL
594434	2016 UE_{97}	—	April 25, 2014	Mount Lemmon	Mount Lemmon Survey	·	2.2 km	MPC · JPL
594435	2016 UL_{97}	—	October 10, 2016	Mount Lemmon	Mount Lemmon Survey	·	1.9 km	MPC · JPL
594436	2016 UL_{103}	—	March 27, 2008	Mount Lemmon	Mount Lemmon Survey	·	2.4 km	MPC · JPL
594437	2016 UY_{109}	—	September 30, 2005	Mount Lemmon	Mount Lemmon Survey	·	1.9 km	MPC · JPL
594438	2016 UA_{114}	—	April 30, 2008	Mount Lemmon	Mount Lemmon Survey	·	2.5 km	MPC · JPL
594439	2016 UQ_{121}	—	May 8, 2014	Haleakala	Pan-STARRS 1	·	2.2 km	MPC · JPL
594440	2016 UG_{136}	—	September 30, 2006	Mount Lemmon	Mount Lemmon Survey	·	2.0 km	MPC · JPL
594441	2016 UO_{141}	—	October 18, 2011	Haleakala	Pan-STARRS 1	·	2.1 km	MPC · JPL
594442	2016 UG_{143}	—	March 12, 2014	Kitt Peak	Spacewatch	·	2.2 km	MPC · JPL
594443	2016 UF_{147}	—	June 28, 2015	Haleakala	Pan-STARRS 1	·	3.0 km	MPC · JPL
594444	2016 UP_{147}	—	November 4, 2005	Kitt Peak	Spacewatch	·	3.1 km	MPC · JPL
594445	2016 US_{251}	—	October 21, 2016	Mount Lemmon	Mount Lemmon Survey	·	1.4 km	MPC · JPL
594446	2016 UZ_{261}	—	October 25, 2016	Haleakala	Pan-STARRS 1	EOS	1.6 km	MPC · JPL
594447	2016 VG_{4}	—	March 16, 2007	Mount Lemmon	Mount Lemmon Survey	H	470 m	MPC · JPL
594448	2016 VZ_{5}	—	November 25, 2011	Haleakala	Pan-STARRS 1	H	480 m	MPC · JPL
594449	2016 VX_{7}	—	June 3, 2014	Haleakala	Pan-STARRS 1	·	3.3 km	MPC · JPL
594450	2016 VU_{15}	—	August 31, 2016	Sayan Solar	Karavaev, Y.	·	1.7 km	MPC · JPL
594451	2016 VJ_{17}	—	March 8, 2008	Mount Lemmon	Mount Lemmon Survey	EOS	1.6 km	MPC · JPL
594452	2016 VY_{21}	—	November 10, 2016	Haleakala	Pan-STARRS 1	ARM	3.0 km	MPC · JPL
594453	2016 VE_{22}	—	November 3, 2016	Haleakala	Pan-STARRS 1	·	1.9 km	MPC · JPL
594454	2016 VN_{29}	—	November 6, 2016	Haleakala	Pan-STARRS 1	·	2.8 km	MPC · JPL
594455	2016 VJ_{36}	—	November 10, 2016	Haleakala	Pan-STARRS 1	·	2.4 km	MPC · JPL
594456	2016 VX_{42}	—	November 12, 1999	Kitt Peak	Spacewatch	MAR	820 m	MPC · JPL
594457	2016 WA	—	June 11, 2010	Mount Lemmon	Mount Lemmon Survey	H	500 m	MPC · JPL
594458	2016 WN	—	February 15, 2015	Haleakala	Pan-STARRS 1	H	520 m	MPC · JPL
594459	2016 WD_{1}	—	November 26, 2011	Kitt Peak	Spacewatch	H	580 m	MPC · JPL
594460	2016 WX_{1}	—	November 19, 2016	Haleakala	Pan-STARRS 1	H	450 m	MPC · JPL
594461	2016 WL_{5}	—	October 23, 2005	Kitt Peak	Spacewatch	EOS	1.5 km	MPC · JPL
594462	2016 WF_{6}	—	December 5, 2005	Kitt Peak	Spacewatch	·	2.4 km	MPC · JPL
594463	2016 WF_{8}	—	April 1, 2015	Haleakala	Pan-STARRS 1	H	380 m	MPC · JPL
594464	2016 WR_{9}	—	September 26, 2000	Haleakala	NEAT	H	480 m	MPC · JPL
594465	2016 WL_{16}	—	September 16, 2010	Mount Lemmon	Mount Lemmon Survey	·	2.2 km	MPC · JPL
594466	2016 WA_{20}	—	March 13, 2013	Mount Lemmon	Mount Lemmon Survey	·	2.7 km	MPC · JPL
594467	2016 WH_{21}	—	December 23, 2012	Mount Lemmon	Mount Lemmon Survey	EOS	2.3 km	MPC · JPL
594468	2016 WO_{22}	—	March 25, 2008	Kitt Peak	Spacewatch	·	1.9 km	MPC · JPL
594469	2016 WM_{24}	—	September 15, 2010	Kitt Peak	Spacewatch	·	2.7 km	MPC · JPL
594470	2016 WK_{28}	—	February 20, 2002	Kitt Peak	Spacewatch	·	2.6 km	MPC · JPL
594471	2016 WL_{29}	—	January 20, 2012	Catalina	CSS	TIR	2.6 km	MPC · JPL
594472	2016 WN_{29}	—	October 17, 2010	Mount Lemmon	Mount Lemmon Survey	·	2.6 km	MPC · JPL
594473	2016 WE_{38}	—	May 21, 2014	Haleakala	Pan-STARRS 1	·	2.4 km	MPC · JPL
594474	2016 WC_{40}	—	November 1, 2010	Mount Lemmon	Mount Lemmon Survey	·	2.9 km	MPC · JPL
594475	2016 WD_{47}	—	December 29, 2011	Mount Lemmon	Mount Lemmon Survey	·	2.3 km	MPC · JPL
594476	2016 WH_{51}	—	September 4, 2011	Haleakala	Pan-STARRS 1	·	1.2 km	MPC · JPL
594477	2016 WK_{72}	—	November 19, 2016	Mount Lemmon	Mount Lemmon Survey	ARM	3.0 km	MPC · JPL
594478	2016 XX_{4}	—	October 6, 2016	Mount Lemmon	Mount Lemmon Survey	·	2.5 km	MPC · JPL
594479	2016 XC_{5}	—	September 21, 2001	Apache Point	SDSS Collaboration	·	2.1 km	MPC · JPL
594480	2016 XN_{5}	—	September 2, 2016	Mount Lemmon	Mount Lemmon Survey	·	2.7 km	MPC · JPL
594481	2016 XV_{6}	—	March 27, 2008	Vail-Jarnac	Jarnac	TEL	1.7 km	MPC · JPL
594482	2016 XL_{10}	—	December 4, 2016	Mount Lemmon	Mount Lemmon Survey	·	2.9 km	MPC · JPL
594483	2016 XK_{15}	—	August 27, 2005	Kitt Peak	Spacewatch	·	3.2 km	MPC · JPL
594484	2016 XZ_{15}	—	October 8, 2016	Haleakala	Pan-STARRS 1	·	2.9 km	MPC · JPL
594485	2016 XE_{19}	—	August 27, 2005	Palomar	NEAT	EOS	2.1 km	MPC · JPL
594486	2016 XF_{19}	—	July 2, 2014	Haleakala	Pan-STARRS 1	·	3.5 km	MPC · JPL
594487	2016 XF_{20}	—	October 20, 2011	Kitt Peak	Spacewatch	·	1.7 km	MPC · JPL
594488	2016 XE_{21}	—	October 13, 2004	Anderson Mesa	LONEOS	·	3.6 km	MPC · JPL
594489	2016 XT_{23}	—	November 6, 2008	Catalina	CSS	H	590 m	MPC · JPL
594490	2016 YD_{10}	—	January 7, 2006	Mount Lemmon	Mount Lemmon Survey	LIX	3.5 km	MPC · JPL
594491	2017 AC_{2}	—	May 8, 2013	Haleakala	Pan-STARRS 1	(1118)	2.8 km	MPC · JPL
594492	2017 AD_{6}	—	April 12, 2002	Palomar	NEAT	EOS	3.0 km	MPC · JPL
594493	2017 AN_{21}	—	February 14, 2012	Haleakala	Pan-STARRS 1	H	310 m	MPC · JPL
594494	2017 AP_{33}	—	January 4, 2017	Haleakala	Pan-STARRS 1	L5	8.3 km	MPC · JPL
594495	2017 BQ	—	January 22, 2009	Farra d'Isonzo	Farra d'Isonzo	H	500 m	MPC · JPL
594496	2017 BR	—	December 2, 2005	Kitt Peak	Spacewatch	H	470 m	MPC · JPL
594497	2017 BG_{1}	—	October 1, 2005	Mount Lemmon	Mount Lemmon Survey	EOS	2.0 km	MPC · JPL
594498	2017 BP_{2}	—	January 19, 2012	Haleakala	Pan-STARRS 1	·	2.1 km	MPC · JPL
594499	2017 BG_{13}	—	December 28, 2016	Haleakala	Pan-STARRS 1	H	560 m	MPC · JPL
594500	2017 BH_{13}	—	May 15, 2013	Haleakala	Pan-STARRS 1	·	4.2 km	MPC · JPL

== 594501–594600 ==
back to top

Designation			Discovery			Properties		Ref
Permanent	Provisional	Named after	Date	Site	Discoverer(s)	Category	Diam.	Ref
594501	2017 BW_{16}	—	October 3, 2015	Mount Lemmon	Mount Lemmon Survey	·	2.8 km	MPC · JPL
594502	2017 BV_{39}	—	December 10, 2010	Mount Lemmon	Mount Lemmon Survey	·	2.8 km	MPC · JPL
594503	2017 BR_{48}	—	October 1, 2015	Mount Lemmon	Mount Lemmon Survey	·	3.2 km	MPC · JPL
594504	2017 BD_{52}	—	October 19, 2003	Kitt Peak	Spacewatch	THM	2.4 km	MPC · JPL
594505	2017 BD_{59}	—	January 7, 2017	Mount Lemmon	Mount Lemmon Survey	·	2.9 km	MPC · JPL
594506	2017 BF_{64}	—	September 16, 2009	Mount Lemmon	Mount Lemmon Survey	·	2.2 km	MPC · JPL
594507	2017 BR_{74}	—	July 4, 2014	Haleakala	Pan-STARRS 1	·	2.6 km	MPC · JPL
594508	2017 BY_{84}	—	May 15, 2012	Haleakala	Pan-STARRS 1	THB	2.9 km	MPC · JPL
594509	2017 BN_{87}	—	November 2, 2010	Mount Lemmon	Mount Lemmon Survey	·	1.9 km	MPC · JPL
594510	2017 BO_{92}	—	September 15, 2004	Kitt Peak	Spacewatch	H	620 m	MPC · JPL
594511	2017 BX_{102}	—	July 25, 2015	Haleakala	Pan-STARRS 1	·	2.8 km	MPC · JPL
594512	2017 BS_{103}	—	November 1, 2015	Mount Lemmon	Mount Lemmon Survey	·	2.8 km	MPC · JPL
594513	2017 BF_{106}	—	December 13, 2010	Kitt Peak	Spacewatch	LIX	2.9 km	MPC · JPL
594514	2017 BX_{106}	—	September 21, 2009	Mount Lemmon	Mount Lemmon Survey	·	2.9 km	MPC · JPL
594515	2017 BJ_{113}	—	September 25, 2009	Mount Lemmon	Mount Lemmon Survey	·	3.1 km	MPC · JPL
594516	2017 BH_{124}	—	November 18, 2015	Haleakala	Pan-STARRS 1	·	2.8 km	MPC · JPL
594517	2017 BS_{127}	—	January 22, 2006	Mount Lemmon	Mount Lemmon Survey	·	2.2 km	MPC · JPL
594518	2017 BP_{149}	—	January 31, 2017	Mount Lemmon	Mount Lemmon Survey	H	360 m	MPC · JPL
594519	2017 CH	—	September 3, 2007	Catalina	CSS	H	500 m	MPC · JPL
594520	2017 CY_{1}	—	November 8, 2016	Haleakala	Pan-STARRS 1	H	610 m	MPC · JPL
594521	2017 CN_{5}	—	February 2, 2017	Haleakala	Pan-STARRS 1	H	500 m	MPC · JPL
594522	2017 CY_{6}	—	October 7, 2016	Kitt Peak	Spacewatch	T_{j} (2.98) · EUP	3.7 km	MPC · JPL
594523	2017 CS_{10}	—	September 20, 2009	Mount Lemmon	Mount Lemmon Survey	·	2.0 km	MPC · JPL
594524	2017 CZ_{15}	—	October 30, 2008	Kitt Peak	Spacewatch	SYL	4.2 km	MPC · JPL
594525	2017 DO_{5}	—	September 30, 2010	Mount Lemmon	Mount Lemmon Survey	AGN	820 m	MPC · JPL
594526	2017 DR_{5}	—	September 19, 1998	Apache Point	SDSS Collaboration	LIX	2.7 km	MPC · JPL
594527	2017 DA_{6}	—	April 25, 2012	Mount Lemmon	Mount Lemmon Survey	T_{j} (2.99)	3.7 km	MPC · JPL
594528	2017 DR_{9}	—	August 30, 1998	Kitt Peak	Spacewatch	·	2.6 km	MPC · JPL
594529	2017 DP_{33}	—	March 2, 2006	Kitt Peak	Spacewatch	·	2.3 km	MPC · JPL
594530	2017 DD_{35}	—	February 22, 2017	Mount Lemmon	Mount Lemmon Survey	H	410 m	MPC · JPL
594531	2017 DE_{77}	—	October 11, 2004	Kitt Peak	Deep Ecliptic Survey	H	480 m	MPC · JPL
594532	2017 DV_{81}	—	January 8, 2011	Catalina	CSS	T_{j} (2.99)	3.8 km	MPC · JPL
594533	2017 DV_{99}	—	February 10, 2007	Mount Lemmon	Mount Lemmon Survey	·	480 m	MPC · JPL
594534	2017 DZ_{111}	—	March 14, 2007	Mount Lemmon	Mount Lemmon Survey	·	3.4 km	MPC · JPL
594535	2017 DG_{112}	—	March 14, 2012	Kitt Peak	Spacewatch	·	3.2 km	MPC · JPL
594536	2017 DF_{135}	—	November 8, 2009	Mount Lemmon	Mount Lemmon Survey	·	2.1 km	MPC · JPL
594537	2017 DN_{142}	—	September 4, 2011	Haleakala	Pan-STARRS 1	·	600 m	MPC · JPL
594538	2017 EQ_{15}	—	September 27, 2009	Kitt Peak	Spacewatch	T_{j} (2.99)	3.0 km	MPC · JPL
594539	2017 FE	—	June 25, 2015	Haleakala	Pan-STARRS 1	·	1.4 km	MPC · JPL
594540	2017 FU_{7}	—	October 23, 2003	Kitt Peak	Deep Ecliptic Survey	·	800 m	MPC · JPL
594541	2017 FP_{10}	—	March 4, 2012	Mount Lemmon	Mount Lemmon Survey	H	490 m	MPC · JPL
594542	2017 FX_{48}	—	September 18, 2009	Kitt Peak	Spacewatch	·	2.6 km	MPC · JPL
594543	2017 FD_{63}	—	October 9, 2004	Anderson Mesa	LONEOS	·	4.6 km	MPC · JPL
594544	2017 FM_{76}	—	January 29, 2014	Catalina	CSS	H	400 m	MPC · JPL
594545	2017 FL_{77}	—	February 15, 2010	Kitt Peak	Spacewatch	·	590 m	MPC · JPL
594546	2017 FZ_{82}	—	July 26, 2011	Haleakala	Pan-STARRS 1	·	480 m	MPC · JPL
594547	2017 FV_{94}	—	October 19, 2007	Mount Lemmon	Mount Lemmon Survey	H	400 m	MPC · JPL
594548	2017 FJ_{103}	—	March 15, 2004	Socorro	LINEAR	·	700 m	MPC · JPL
594549	2017 FH_{108}	—	April 2, 2009	Mount Lemmon	Mount Lemmon Survey	H	410 m	MPC · JPL
594550	2017 FH_{119}	—	April 5, 2014	Haleakala	Pan-STARRS 1	·	600 m	MPC · JPL
594551	2017 FT_{158}	—	August 3, 2015	Haleakala	Pan-STARRS 1	H	500 m	MPC · JPL
594552	2017 GA_{12}	—	March 14, 2007	Mount Lemmon	Mount Lemmon Survey	·	590 m	MPC · JPL
594553	2017 HH_{4}	—	April 16, 2004	Kitt Peak	Spacewatch	·	670 m	MPC · JPL
594554	2017 HE_{8}	—	March 8, 2011	Catalina	CSS	·	1.2 km	MPC · JPL
594555	2017 HR_{16}	—	November 7, 2015	Mount Lemmon	Mount Lemmon Survey	·	570 m	MPC · JPL
594556	2017 HF_{17}	—	May 6, 2014	Haleakala	Pan-STARRS 1	·	500 m	MPC · JPL
594557	2017 HG_{25}	—	November 8, 2008	Mount Lemmon	Mount Lemmon Survey	·	750 m	MPC · JPL
594558	2017 KE_{8}	—	April 9, 2010	Mount Lemmon	Mount Lemmon Survey	·	630 m	MPC · JPL
594559	2017 KM_{12}	—	August 22, 2003	Palomar	NEAT	·	870 m	MPC · JPL
594560	2017 KV_{15}	—	January 28, 2007	Kitt Peak	Spacewatch	·	510 m	MPC · JPL
594561	2017 KD_{23}	—	December 26, 2011	Mount Lemmon	Mount Lemmon Survey	·	680 m	MPC · JPL
594562	2017 KF_{24}	—	August 11, 2004	Palomar	NEAT	PHO	770 m	MPC · JPL
594563	2017 LS	—	September 28, 2009	Mount Lemmon	Mount Lemmon Survey	L4	10 km	MPC · JPL
594564	2017 NC_{1}	—	December 31, 2007	Mount Lemmon	Mount Lemmon Survey	·	1.1 km	MPC · JPL
594565	2017 NJ_{1}	—	June 8, 2013	Mount Lemmon	Mount Lemmon Survey	·	830 m	MPC · JPL
594566	2017 NK_{1}	—	January 3, 2016	Haleakala	Pan-STARRS 1	PHO	540 m	MPC · JPL
594567	2017 NS_{2}	—	July 17, 2002	Palomar	NEAT	V	560 m	MPC · JPL
594568	2017 OQ_{1}	—	September 18, 2003	Palomar	NEAT	·	970 m	MPC · JPL
594569	2017 ON_{4}	—	September 12, 2007	Catalina	CSS	·	960 m	MPC · JPL
594570	2017 OV_{6}	—	January 8, 2016	Haleakala	Pan-STARRS 1	·	810 m	MPC · JPL
594571	2017 OM_{8}	—	August 19, 2006	Kitt Peak	Spacewatch	MAS	620 m	MPC · JPL
594572	2017 OK_{10}	—	October 22, 2003	Kitt Peak	Deep Ecliptic Survey	·	850 m	MPC · JPL
594573	2017 OR_{12}	—	June 19, 2010	Mount Lemmon	Mount Lemmon Survey	·	970 m	MPC · JPL
594574	2017 OS_{32}	—	October 29, 2010	Piszkés-tető	K. Sárneczky, Z. Kuli	V	470 m	MPC · JPL
594575	2017 OS_{40}	—	February 5, 2016	Haleakala	Pan-STARRS 1	·	940 m	MPC · JPL
594576	2017 OC_{41}	—	August 8, 2013	Haleakala	Pan-STARRS 1	V	610 m	MPC · JPL
594577	2017 OD_{50}	—	March 18, 2004	Kitt Peak	Spacewatch	·	830 m	MPC · JPL
594578	2017 OE_{50}	—	April 7, 2013	Kitt Peak	Spacewatch	·	940 m	MPC · JPL
594579	2017 OH_{51}	—	October 5, 2013	Haleakala	Pan-STARRS 1	·	990 m	MPC · JPL
594580	2017 OE_{52}	—	October 11, 2010	Catalina	CSS	·	1.0 km	MPC · JPL
594581	2017 OD_{54}	—	February 21, 2007	Mount Lemmon	Mount Lemmon Survey	HNS	760 m	MPC · JPL
594582	2017 ON_{56}	—	April 15, 2005	Kitt Peak	Spacewatch	NYS	1.0 km	MPC · JPL
594583	2017 OV_{56}	—	August 28, 2006	Catalina	CSS	·	800 m	MPC · JPL
594584	2017 OK_{58}	—	February 19, 2012	Kitt Peak	Spacewatch	·	920 m	MPC · JPL
594585	2017 OG_{64}	—	February 10, 2008	Kitt Peak	Spacewatch	·	1.2 km	MPC · JPL
594586	2017 OQ_{64}	—	August 15, 2013	Haleakala	Pan-STARRS 1	·	1.1 km	MPC · JPL
594587	2017 OB_{66}	—	October 1, 2005	Mount Lemmon	Mount Lemmon Survey	·	930 m	MPC · JPL
594588	2017 OY_{88}	—	July 21, 2017	ESA OGS	ESA OGS	·	1 km	MPC · JPL
594589	2017 OA_{89}	—	July 22, 2017	Haleakala	Pan-STARRS 1	NYS	1.0 km	MPC · JPL
594590	2017 ON_{101}	—	July 25, 2017	Haleakala	Pan-STARRS 1	(5)	980 m	MPC · JPL
594591	2017 OL_{122}	—	May 8, 2010	Mount Lemmon	Mount Lemmon Survey	·	2.5 km	MPC · JPL
594592	2017 OV_{122}	—	July 29, 2017	Haleakala	Pan-STARRS 1	·	1.4 km	MPC · JPL
594593	2017 PM	—	September 16, 2002	Palomar	NEAT	·	1.1 km	MPC · JPL
594594	2017 PP	—	November 23, 2014	Mount Lemmon	Mount Lemmon Survey	·	570 m	MPC · JPL
594595	2017 PS	—	September 17, 1995	Kitt Peak	Spacewatch	·	990 m	MPC · JPL
594596	2017 PD_{1}	—	February 7, 2011	Mount Lemmon	Mount Lemmon Survey	·	1.1 km	MPC · JPL
594597	2017 PE_{2}	—	February 3, 2012	Haleakala	Pan-STARRS 1	PHO	880 m	MPC · JPL
594598	2017 PL_{2}	—	November 1, 2010	Mount Lemmon	Mount Lemmon Survey	V	420 m	MPC · JPL
594599	2017 PF_{6}	—	January 14, 2016	Haleakala	Pan-STARRS 1	·	810 m	MPC · JPL
594600	2017 PH_{15}	—	February 16, 2012	Haleakala	Pan-STARRS 1	NYS	950 m	MPC · JPL

== 594601–594700 ==
back to top

Designation			Discovery			Properties		Ref
Permanent	Provisional	Named after	Date	Site	Discoverer(s)	Category	Diam.	Ref
594601	2017 PJ_{19}	—	January 20, 2015	Haleakala	Pan-STARRS 1	(5)	1.1 km	MPC · JPL
594602	2017 PN_{20}	—	February 11, 2016	Haleakala	Pan-STARRS 1	·	850 m	MPC · JPL
594603	2017 PW_{21}	—	November 20, 2006	Mount Lemmon	Mount Lemmon Survey	·	1.2 km	MPC · JPL
594604	2017 PK_{22}	—	February 26, 2004	Kitt Peak	Deep Ecliptic Survey	·	970 m	MPC · JPL
594605	2017 PY_{33}	—	January 14, 2016	Haleakala	Pan-STARRS 1	·	740 m	MPC · JPL
594606	2017 PV_{38}	—	September 26, 2006	Kitt Peak	Spacewatch	NYS	790 m	MPC · JPL
594607	2017 PQ_{64}	—	August 15, 2017	Haleakala	Pan-STARRS 1	·	1.3 km	MPC · JPL
594608	2017 QH_{4}	—	September 15, 2010	Mount Lemmon	Mount Lemmon Survey	V	690 m	MPC · JPL
594609	2017 QD_{5}	—	December 20, 2004	Mount Lemmon	Mount Lemmon Survey	NYS	880 m	MPC · JPL
594610	2017 QA_{7}	—	December 12, 2004	Kitt Peak	Spacewatch	·	900 m	MPC · JPL
594611	2017 QE_{9}	—	February 11, 2016	Haleakala	Pan-STARRS 1	NYS	970 m	MPC · JPL
594612	2017 QN_{14}	—	February 1, 2009	Kitt Peak	Spacewatch	·	980 m	MPC · JPL
594613	2017 QG_{19}	—	December 19, 2004	Mount Lemmon	Mount Lemmon Survey	NYS	690 m	MPC · JPL
594614	2017 QM_{20}	—	August 17, 2002	Palomar	NEAT	NYS	980 m	MPC · JPL
594615	2017 QZ_{22}	—	February 3, 2012	Haleakala	Pan-STARRS 1	V	490 m	MPC · JPL
594616	2017 QU_{23}	—	March 11, 2016	Mount Lemmon	Mount Lemmon Survey	·	1.3 km	MPC · JPL
594617	2017 QL_{29}	—	January 18, 2008	Kitt Peak	Spacewatch	·	1.2 km	MPC · JPL
594618	2017 QE_{31}	—	March 28, 2016	Cerro Tololo	DECam	·	1.2 km	MPC · JPL
594619	2017 QK_{32}	—	August 28, 2013	Catalina	CSS	·	1.1 km	MPC · JPL
594620	2017 QQ_{46}	—	January 11, 2008	Kitt Peak	Spacewatch	·	810 m	MPC · JPL
594621	2017 QG_{51}	—	December 18, 2007	Mount Lemmon	Mount Lemmon Survey	·	830 m	MPC · JPL
594622	2017 QQ_{54}	—	August 24, 2006	Palomar	NEAT	·	1.1 km	MPC · JPL
594623	2017 QA_{55}	—	September 28, 2006	Mount Lemmon	Mount Lemmon Survey	·	1.1 km	MPC · JPL
594624	2017 QT_{55}	—	January 31, 2016	Haleakala	Pan-STARRS 1	·	1.1 km	MPC · JPL
594625	2017 QZ_{57}	—	January 12, 2011	Kitt Peak	Spacewatch	·	1.0 km	MPC · JPL
594626	2017 QE_{60}	—	April 14, 2008	Mount Lemmon	Mount Lemmon Survey	·	1.6 km	MPC · JPL
594627	2017 QT_{65}	—	November 20, 2014	Mount Lemmon	Mount Lemmon Survey	·	1.6 km	MPC · JPL
594628	2017 QQ_{66}	—	December 13, 2006	Mount Lemmon	Mount Lemmon Survey	·	1.3 km	MPC · JPL
594629	2017 RT_{13}	—	February 11, 2011	Mount Lemmon	Mount Lemmon Survey	·	830 m	MPC · JPL
594630	2017 RY_{19}	—	January 19, 2008	Mount Lemmon	Mount Lemmon Survey	·	1.4 km	MPC · JPL
594631	2017 RG_{20}	—	May 31, 2009	Mount Lemmon	Mount Lemmon Survey	·	1.2 km	MPC · JPL
594632	2017 RN_{20}	—	February 20, 2015	Haleakala	Pan-STARRS 1	·	910 m	MPC · JPL
594633	2017 RY_{22}	—	August 8, 2013	Haleakala	Pan-STARRS 1	·	1.4 km	MPC · JPL
594634	2017 RD_{23}	—	January 10, 2003	Kitt Peak	Spacewatch	·	1.0 km	MPC · JPL
594635	2017 RH_{28}	—	May 18, 2001	Haleakala	NEAT	·	1.4 km	MPC · JPL
594636	2017 RV_{28}	—	September 17, 2006	Kitt Peak	Spacewatch	NYS	990 m	MPC · JPL
594637	2017 RX_{33}	—	March 15, 2007	Kitt Peak	Spacewatch	(5)	900 m	MPC · JPL
594638	2017 RS_{35}	—	October 25, 2005	Mount Lemmon	Mount Lemmon Survey	·	1.2 km	MPC · JPL
594639	2017 RC_{39}	—	September 15, 2006	Kitt Peak	Spacewatch	·	1.4 km	MPC · JPL
594640	2017 RN_{39}	—	March 13, 2016	Haleakala	Pan-STARRS 1	·	880 m	MPC · JPL
594641	2017 RO_{39}	—	April 3, 2008	Mount Lemmon	Mount Lemmon Survey	MAS	550 m	MPC · JPL
594642	2017 RJ_{41}	—	October 2, 2006	Mount Lemmon	Mount Lemmon Survey	·	1.1 km	MPC · JPL
594643	2017 RY_{43}	—	January 25, 2006	Kitt Peak	Spacewatch	·	1.3 km	MPC · JPL
594644	2017 RU_{58}	—	October 2, 2013	Haleakala	Pan-STARRS 1	·	730 m	MPC · JPL
594645	2017 RH_{59}	—	March 13, 2007	Kitt Peak	Spacewatch	·	940 m	MPC · JPL
594646	2017 RQ_{67}	—	January 2, 2011	Mount Lemmon	Mount Lemmon Survey	·	780 m	MPC · JPL
594647	2017 RG_{69}	—	February 23, 2007	Mount Lemmon	Mount Lemmon Survey	·	650 m	MPC · JPL
594648	2017 RP_{72}	—	March 6, 2011	Kitt Peak	Spacewatch	EUN	880 m	MPC · JPL
594649	2017 RB_{73}	—	October 5, 2013	Mount Lemmon	Mount Lemmon Survey	RAF	690 m	MPC · JPL
594650	2017 RN_{73}	—	January 4, 2010	Kitt Peak	Spacewatch	·	1.1 km	MPC · JPL
594651	2017 RE_{77}	—	January 20, 2015	Haleakala	Pan-STARRS 1	·	1.2 km	MPC · JPL
594652	2017 RJ_{77}	—	October 2, 2013	Kitt Peak	Spacewatch	ADE	1.6 km	MPC · JPL
594653	2017 RF_{79}	—	August 31, 2017	Haleakala	Pan-STARRS 1	EUN	820 m	MPC · JPL
594654	2017 RG_{79}	—	October 19, 2006	Kitt Peak	Deep Ecliptic Survey	·	1.2 km	MPC · JPL
594655	2017 RG_{80}	—	July 18, 2006	Mount Lemmon	Mount Lemmon Survey	MAS	640 m	MPC · JPL
594656	2017 RT_{83}	—	November 15, 2006	Kitt Peak	Spacewatch	MAS	710 m	MPC · JPL
594657	2017 RH_{93}	—	February 12, 2002	Kitt Peak	Spacewatch	·	1.5 km	MPC · JPL
594658	2017 RR_{93}	—	February 2, 2008	Kitt Peak	Spacewatch	MAS	730 m	MPC · JPL
594659	2017 RG_{97}	—	January 30, 2011	Mount Lemmon	Mount Lemmon Survey	·	950 m	MPC · JPL
594660	2017 RH_{102}	—	April 19, 2012	Mount Lemmon	Mount Lemmon Survey	·	690 m	MPC · JPL
594661	2017 SY	—	October 26, 2013	Kitt Peak	Spacewatch	·	1.3 km	MPC · JPL
594662	2017 SU_{7}	—	December 1, 2006	Mount Lemmon	Mount Lemmon Survey	MAR	1.2 km	MPC · JPL
594663	2017 SJ_{8}	—	October 26, 2008	Mount Lemmon	Mount Lemmon Survey	·	1.4 km	MPC · JPL
594664	2017 SG_{9}	—	May 29, 2003	Cerro Tololo	Deep Ecliptic Survey	·	1.5 km	MPC · JPL
594665	2017 SG_{26}	—	October 25, 2005	Mount Lemmon	Mount Lemmon Survey	·	780 m	MPC · JPL
594666	2017 SM_{29}	—	May 13, 2007	Mount Lemmon	Mount Lemmon Survey	EUN	1.1 km	MPC · JPL
594667	2017 SZ_{29}	—	September 21, 2012	Mount Lemmon	Mount Lemmon Survey	HOF	1.9 km	MPC · JPL
594668	2017 SE_{44}	—	July 1, 2013	Haleakala	Pan-STARRS 1	V	540 m	MPC · JPL
594669	2017 SH_{49}	—	December 18, 2001	Socorro	LINEAR	(5)	950 m	MPC · JPL
594670	2017 SF_{62}	—	February 28, 2009	Mount Lemmon	Mount Lemmon Survey	·	1.2 km	MPC · JPL
594671	2017 SF_{64}	—	August 12, 2013	Haleakala	Pan-STARRS 1	·	1.0 km	MPC · JPL
594672	2017 SH_{66}	—	February 23, 2007	Mount Lemmon	Mount Lemmon Survey	·	1.8 km	MPC · JPL
594673	2017 SB_{67}	—	February 21, 2007	Mount Lemmon	Mount Lemmon Survey	·	1.2 km	MPC · JPL
594674	2017 SA_{68}	—	September 27, 2010	Kitt Peak	Spacewatch	V	550 m	MPC · JPL
594675	2017 SU_{70}	—	March 25, 2000	Kitt Peak	Spacewatch	·	1.0 km	MPC · JPL
594676	2017 SP_{76}	—	March 31, 2009	Catalina	CSS	·	1.2 km	MPC · JPL
594677	2017 SM_{77}	—	April 20, 2007	Mount Lemmon	Mount Lemmon Survey	·	1.3 km	MPC · JPL
594678	2017 SS_{77}	—	October 4, 2005	Mount Lemmon	Mount Lemmon Survey	·	760 m	MPC · JPL
594679	2017 ST_{78}	—	October 1, 2013	Kitt Peak	Spacewatch	(29841)	1.1 km	MPC · JPL
594680	2017 SU_{83}	—	January 6, 2010	Kitt Peak	Spacewatch	·	1.2 km	MPC · JPL
594681	2017 SZ_{84}	—	February 10, 2007	Mount Lemmon	Mount Lemmon Survey	·	1.2 km	MPC · JPL
594682	2017 SO_{89}	—	October 20, 2003	Kitt Peak	Spacewatch	·	870 m	MPC · JPL
594683	2017 SL_{96}	—	October 31, 2005	Mount Lemmon	Mount Lemmon Survey	·	1.2 km	MPC · JPL
594684	2017 SV_{98}	—	January 13, 2015	Haleakala	Pan-STARRS 1	·	1.3 km	MPC · JPL
594685	2017 SV_{104}	—	September 9, 2013	Haleakala	Pan-STARRS 1	·	1.3 km	MPC · JPL
594686	2017 SP_{108}	—	September 17, 2004	Socorro	LINEAR	MAR	1.1 km	MPC · JPL
594687	2017 SG_{112}	—	April 6, 2008	Mount Lemmon	Mount Lemmon Survey	·	1.5 km	MPC · JPL
594688	2017 SN_{112}	—	August 15, 2013	Haleakala	Pan-STARRS 1	·	1.0 km	MPC · JPL
594689	2017 SY_{114}	—	May 8, 2008	Mount Lemmon	Mount Lemmon Survey	EUN	990 m	MPC · JPL
594690	2017 SK_{125}	—	February 23, 2015	Haleakala	Pan-STARRS 1	HNS	880 m	MPC · JPL
594691	2017 SQ_{125}	—	September 26, 2017	Haleakala	Pan-STARRS 1	·	1.1 km	MPC · JPL
594692	2017 SN_{128}	—	January 22, 2015	Haleakala	Pan-STARRS 1	·	1.1 km	MPC · JPL
594693	2017 SE_{129}	—	September 16, 2009	Kitt Peak	Spacewatch	·	790 m	MPC · JPL
594694	2017 SA_{130}	—	September 13, 2013	Mount Lemmon	Mount Lemmon Survey	·	1.2 km	MPC · JPL
594695	2017 ST_{196}	—	September 23, 2017	Haleakala	Pan-STARRS 1	·	1.2 km	MPC · JPL
594696	2017 SA_{198}	—	September 24, 2017	Haleakala	Pan-STARRS 1	KON	1.8 km	MPC · JPL
594697	2017 SE_{199}	—	September 27, 2017	Haleakala	Pan-STARRS 1	AGN	820 m	MPC · JPL
594698	2017 SG_{199}	—	September 23, 2017	Haleakala	Pan-STARRS 1	·	1.4 km	MPC · JPL
594699	2017 SZ_{200}	—	September 30, 2017	Mount Lemmon	Mount Lemmon Survey	·	1.1 km	MPC · JPL
594700	2017 SU_{201}	—	September 23, 2017	Haleakala	Pan-STARRS 1	·	1.4 km	MPC · JPL

== 594701–594800 ==
back to top

Designation			Discovery			Properties		Ref
Permanent	Provisional	Named after	Date	Site	Discoverer(s)	Category	Diam.	Ref
594701	2017 SN_{210}	—	September 25, 2017	Haleakala	Pan-STARRS 1	BRG	1.3 km	MPC · JPL
594702	2017 SE_{211}	—	September 30, 2017	Haleakala	Pan-STARRS 1	MAR	850 m	MPC · JPL
594703	2017 SN_{211}	—	April 14, 2015	Mount Lemmon	Mount Lemmon Survey	AGN	870 m	MPC · JPL
594704	2017 TF_{9}	—	September 14, 2013	Mount Lemmon	Mount Lemmon Survey	·	1.3 km	MPC · JPL
594705	2017 TB_{12}	—	April 24, 2012	Mount Lemmon	Mount Lemmon Survey	·	1.4 km	MPC · JPL
594706	2017 TT_{27}	—	October 15, 2017	Mount Lemmon	Mount Lemmon Survey	·	1.2 km	MPC · JPL
594707	2017 TY_{31}	—	November 11, 2013	Kitt Peak	Spacewatch	(5)	620 m	MPC · JPL
594708	2017 UJ_{29}	—	March 16, 2007	Mount Lemmon	Mount Lemmon Survey	·	1.2 km	MPC · JPL
594709	2017 UQ_{30}	—	August 15, 2013	Haleakala	Pan-STARRS 1	NYS	970 m	MPC · JPL
594710	2017 UN_{37}	—	June 8, 2016	Haleakala	Pan-STARRS 1	EUN	850 m	MPC · JPL
594711	2017 UZ_{37}	—	November 10, 2013	Mount Lemmon	Mount Lemmon Survey	·	1.2 km	MPC · JPL
594712	2017 UK_{38}	—	April 14, 2007	Kitt Peak	Spacewatch	HNS	930 m	MPC · JPL
594713	2017 UT_{38}	—	April 3, 2003	Cerro Tololo	Deep Lens Survey	·	1.1 km	MPC · JPL
594714	2017 UJ_{39}	—	November 26, 2013	Mount Lemmon	Mount Lemmon Survey	·	1.4 km	MPC · JPL
594715	2017 UC_{40}	—	September 18, 2012	Mount Lemmon	Mount Lemmon Survey	HOF	2.0 km	MPC · JPL
594716	2017 UT_{40}	—	March 14, 2010	Mount Lemmon	Mount Lemmon Survey	·	1.5 km	MPC · JPL
594717	2017 UQ_{45}	—	October 21, 2003	Kitt Peak	Spacewatch	·	2.5 km	MPC · JPL
594718	2017 UK_{93}	—	October 21, 2017	Mount Lemmon	Mount Lemmon Survey	·	1.3 km	MPC · JPL
594719	2017 US_{93}	—	October 23, 2017	Mount Lemmon	Mount Lemmon Survey	·	1.2 km	MPC · JPL
594720	2017 UM_{94}	—	October 27, 2017	Mount Lemmon	Mount Lemmon Survey	·	1.2 km	MPC · JPL
594721	2017 UE_{95}	—	October 27, 2017	Mount Lemmon	Mount Lemmon Survey	·	1.4 km	MPC · JPL
594722	2017 US_{104}	—	May 12, 2015	Mount Lemmon	Mount Lemmon Survey	·	1.5 km	MPC · JPL
594723	2017 UZ_{104}	—	October 6, 2012	Haleakala	Pan-STARRS 1	·	1.8 km	MPC · JPL
594724	2017 UL_{108}	—	October 24, 2017	Mount Lemmon	Mount Lemmon Survey	·	1.1 km	MPC · JPL
594725	2017 VB_{1}	—	August 30, 2008	Socorro	LINEAR	·	1.8 km	MPC · JPL
594726	2017 VV_{10}	—	March 26, 2007	Mount Lemmon	Mount Lemmon Survey	·	1.3 km	MPC · JPL
594727	2017 VD_{21}	—	March 24, 2015	Mount Lemmon	Mount Lemmon Survey	·	1.4 km	MPC · JPL
594728	2017 VJ_{21}	—	April 19, 2012	Mount Lemmon	Mount Lemmon Survey	·	1.1 km	MPC · JPL
594729	2017 VW_{21}	—	May 12, 2015	Mount Lemmon	Mount Lemmon Survey	AGN	1 km	MPC · JPL
594730	2017 VH_{24}	—	December 2, 2008	Kitt Peak	Spacewatch	HOF	1.8 km	MPC · JPL
594731	2017 VS_{28}	—	December 24, 2013	Mount Lemmon	Mount Lemmon Survey	·	2.2 km	MPC · JPL
594732	2017 VB_{29}	—	September 23, 2008	Kitt Peak	Spacewatch	·	1.4 km	MPC · JPL
594733	2017 VN_{32}	—	September 7, 2004	Socorro	LINEAR	(5)	1.2 km	MPC · JPL
594734	2017 VD_{34}	—	November 27, 2013	Haleakala	Pan-STARRS 1	(5)	830 m	MPC · JPL
594735	2017 VZ_{43}	—	November 7, 2017	Haleakala	Pan-STARRS 1	·	990 m	MPC · JPL
594736	2017 VD_{46}	—	September 23, 2017	Haleakala	Pan-STARRS 1	·	1.3 km	MPC · JPL
594737	2017 WM_{4}	—	July 16, 2004	Siding Spring	SSS	·	1.5 km	MPC · JPL
594738	2017 WK_{8}	—	August 29, 2006	Kitt Peak	Spacewatch	·	1.6 km	MPC · JPL
594739	2017 WS_{8}	—	February 26, 2014	Haleakala	Pan-STARRS 1	EMA	2.8 km	MPC · JPL
594740	2017 WO_{9}	—	February 16, 2015	Haleakala	Pan-STARRS 1	·	1.2 km	MPC · JPL
594741	2017 WW_{18}	—	March 4, 2005	Kitt Peak	Spacewatch	·	1.5 km	MPC · JPL
594742	2017 WZ_{20}	—	November 10, 2008	La Sagra	OAM	·	2.1 km	MPC · JPL
594743	2017 WP_{24}	—	October 26, 2013	Mount Lemmon	Mount Lemmon Survey	EUN	810 m	MPC · JPL
594744	2017 WZ_{42}	—	November 18, 2017	Haleakala	Pan-STARRS 1	·	1.6 km	MPC · JPL
594745	2017 WL_{47}	—	November 18, 2017	Haleakala	Pan-STARRS 1	MAR	880 m	MPC · JPL
594746	2017 WF_{48}	—	November 21, 2017	Haleakala	Pan-STARRS 1	EOS	1.3 km	MPC · JPL
594747	2017 WU_{49}	—	June 8, 2016	Haleakala	Pan-STARRS 1	·	1.4 km	MPC · JPL
594748	2017 XU_{3}	—	June 2, 2016	Mount Lemmon	Mount Lemmon Survey	·	1.1 km	MPC · JPL
594749	2017 XV_{4}	—	October 29, 2008	Kitt Peak	Spacewatch	JUN	1.1 km	MPC · JPL
594750	2017 XR_{19}	—	October 16, 2009	Mount Lemmon	Mount Lemmon Survey	·	1.0 km	MPC · JPL
594751	2017 XJ_{24}	—	November 21, 2003	Kitt Peak	Spacewatch	·	1.3 km	MPC · JPL
594752	2017 XE_{25}	—	April 25, 2015	Haleakala	Pan-STARRS 1	EOS	1.5 km	MPC · JPL
594753	2017 XN_{25}	—	September 22, 2008	Kitt Peak	Spacewatch	·	1.4 km	MPC · JPL
594754	2017 XS_{25}	—	November 7, 2008	Mount Lemmon	Mount Lemmon Survey	·	1.4 km	MPC · JPL
594755	2017 XO_{27}	—	September 23, 2012	Mount Lemmon	Mount Lemmon Survey	·	1.4 km	MPC · JPL
594756	2017 XV_{30}	—	November 3, 2004	Kitt Peak	Spacewatch	·	1.3 km	MPC · JPL
594757	2017 XH_{33}	—	September 21, 2008	Kitt Peak	Spacewatch	·	1.4 km	MPC · JPL
594758	2017 XA_{34}	—	January 30, 2011	Mount Lemmon	Mount Lemmon Survey	·	1.3 km	MPC · JPL
594759	2017 XC_{34}	—	September 29, 2008	Kitt Peak	Spacewatch	·	1.3 km	MPC · JPL
594760	2017 XT_{47}	—	November 7, 2012	Mount Lemmon	Mount Lemmon Survey	NAE	1.7 km	MPC · JPL
594761	2017 XN_{48}	—	July 19, 2006	Mauna Kea	P. A. Wiegert, D. Subasinghe	KOR	1.1 km	MPC · JPL
594762	2017 XY_{51}	—	October 19, 2003	Kitt Peak	Spacewatch	AGN	970 m	MPC · JPL
594763	2017 XL_{52}	—	October 9, 2007	Mount Lemmon	Mount Lemmon Survey	KOR	1.0 km	MPC · JPL
594764	2017 XG_{53}	—	November 2, 2008	Kitt Peak	Spacewatch	·	1.5 km	MPC · JPL
594765	2017 XN_{56}	—	December 1, 2008	Kitt Peak	Spacewatch	·	1.5 km	MPC · JPL
594766	2017 XN_{58}	—	September 21, 2012	Mount Lemmon	Mount Lemmon Survey	·	1.4 km	MPC · JPL
594767	2017 XY_{58}	—	March 10, 1997	Kitt Peak	Spacewatch	·	1.6 km	MPC · JPL
594768	2017 XN_{59}	—	April 23, 2015	Haleakala	Pan-STARRS 1	·	1.6 km	MPC · JPL
594769	2017 XD_{62}	—	December 15, 2017	Mount Lemmon	Mount Lemmon Survey	AMO	420 m	MPC · JPL
594770	2017 XC_{63}	—	June 8, 2012	Mount Lemmon	Mount Lemmon Survey	·	910 m	MPC · JPL
594771	2017 XP_{64}	—	November 16, 2006	Kitt Peak	Spacewatch	·	2.2 km	MPC · JPL
594772	2017 YN_{10}	—	December 27, 2006	Mount Lemmon	Mount Lemmon Survey	EOS	1.6 km	MPC · JPL
594773	2017 YZ_{10}	—	September 22, 2017	Haleakala	Pan-STARRS 1	·	1.1 km	MPC · JPL
594774	2017 YF_{11}	—	January 25, 2003	Kitt Peak	Spacewatch	·	1.9 km	MPC · JPL
594775	2017 YH_{11}	—	March 25, 2007	Mount Lemmon	Mount Lemmon Survey	·	1.8 km	MPC · JPL
594776	2017 YU_{12}	—	February 3, 2008	Mount Lemmon	Mount Lemmon Survey	EOS	1.4 km	MPC · JPL
594777	2017 YE_{13}	—	October 7, 2005	Mount Lemmon	Mount Lemmon Survey	·	2.4 km	MPC · JPL
594778	2017 YA_{14}	—	December 13, 2004	Kitt Peak	Spacewatch	·	1.4 km	MPC · JPL
594779	2017 YR_{14}	—	December 19, 2009	Mount Lemmon	Mount Lemmon Survey	HNS	1.5 km	MPC · JPL
594780	2017 YU_{14}	—	December 24, 2013	Catalina	CSS	EUN	1.1 km	MPC · JPL
594781	2017 YT_{15}	—	January 1, 2014	Nogales	M. Schwartz, P. R. Holvorcem	·	1.4 km	MPC · JPL
594782 Kacperwierzchoś	2017 YV_{15}	Kacperwierzchoś	December 2, 2013	Tincana	M. Kusiak, M. Żołnowski	·	1.2 km	MPC · JPL
594783	2017 YV_{23}	—	December 25, 2017	Haleakala	Pan-STARRS 1	·	2.7 km	MPC · JPL
594784	2017 YA_{27}	—	December 23, 2017	Haleakala	Pan-STARRS 1	·	3.2 km	MPC · JPL
594785	2017 YB_{27}	—	December 29, 2017	Haleakala	Pan-STARRS 1	·	2.3 km	MPC · JPL
594786	2018 AJ_{5}	—	August 26, 2012	Haleakala	Pan-STARRS 1	·	1.6 km	MPC · JPL
594787	2018 AU_{7}	—	November 23, 2011	Mount Lemmon	Mount Lemmon Survey	·	2.2 km	MPC · JPL
594788	2018 AV_{13}	—	September 23, 2008	Kitt Peak	Spacewatch	·	1.4 km	MPC · JPL
594789	2018 AA_{17}	—	March 5, 2013	Mount Lemmon	Mount Lemmon Survey	·	2.9 km	MPC · JPL
594790	2018 AS_{29}	—	January 15, 2018	Haleakala	Pan-STARRS 1	·	1.4 km	MPC · JPL
594791	2018 BL_{10}	—	January 23, 2006	Kitt Peak	Spacewatch	·	1.2 km	MPC · JPL
594792	2018 BO_{10}	—	December 1, 2008	Catalina	CSS	·	1.2 km	MPC · JPL
594793	2018 BY_{10}	—	February 23, 2007	Kitt Peak	Spacewatch	VER	2.2 km	MPC · JPL
594794	2018 BO_{11}	—	November 17, 2006	Kitt Peak	Spacewatch	·	2.0 km	MPC · JPL
594795	2018 BL_{12}	—	March 10, 2007	Mount Lemmon	Mount Lemmon Survey	·	2.3 km	MPC · JPL
594796	2018 BZ_{12}	—	December 1, 2010	Mount Lemmon	Mount Lemmon Survey	·	3.0 km	MPC · JPL
594797	2018 CC_{4}	—	February 1, 2009	Mount Lemmon	Mount Lemmon Survey	·	2.0 km	MPC · JPL
594798	2018 CO_{4}	—	December 31, 2008	Mount Lemmon	Mount Lemmon Survey	·	1.8 km	MPC · JPL
594799	2018 CZ_{5}	—	April 14, 2008	Mount Lemmon	Mount Lemmon Survey	·	3.2 km	MPC · JPL
594800	2018 CC_{6}	—	March 26, 1996	Haleakala	AMOS	JUN	1.1 km	MPC · JPL

== 594801–594900 ==
back to top

Designation			Discovery			Properties		Ref
Permanent	Provisional	Named after	Date	Site	Discoverer(s)	Category	Diam.	Ref
594801	2018 CM_{6}	—	April 17, 2013	Siding Spring	SSS	·	4.2 km	MPC · JPL
594802	2018 CC_{7}	—	December 14, 2004	Socorro	LINEAR	·	1.5 km	MPC · JPL
594803	2018 CL_{8}	—	January 18, 2007	Palomar	NEAT	T_{j} (2.98)	2.4 km	MPC · JPL
594804	2018 CY_{8}	—	December 18, 2001	Socorro	LINEAR	·	2.2 km	MPC · JPL
594805	2018 CC_{9}	—	January 13, 2005	Kitt Peak	Spacewatch	·	1.5 km	MPC · JPL
594806	2018 CN_{9}	—	January 21, 2004	Socorro	LINEAR	·	1.8 km	MPC · JPL
594807	2018 CQ_{12}	—	January 4, 2013	Kitt Peak	Spacewatch	·	1.7 km	MPC · JPL
594808	2018 CB_{13}	—	October 23, 2011	Haleakala	Pan-STARRS 1	EOS	1.6 km	MPC · JPL
594809	2018 CO_{18}	—	February 10, 2018	Mount Lemmon	Mount Lemmon Survey	·	2.7 km	MPC · JPL
594810	2018 EC_{5}	—	August 29, 2005	Kitt Peak	Spacewatch	·	2.5 km	MPC · JPL
594811	2018 ES_{5}	—	August 15, 2009	Kitt Peak	Spacewatch	·	3.8 km	MPC · JPL
594812	2018 EH_{14}	—	March 7, 2018	Haleakala	Pan-STARRS 1	·	2.3 km	MPC · JPL
594813	2018 FM_{10}	—	January 26, 2012	Mount Lemmon	Mount Lemmon Survey	·	2.4 km	MPC · JPL
594814	2018 FO_{12}	—	February 21, 2007	Kitt Peak	Spacewatch	·	2.9 km	MPC · JPL
594815	2018 FF_{16}	—	November 4, 2004	Kitt Peak	Spacewatch	·	3.2 km	MPC · JPL
594816	2018 FZ_{18}	—	September 18, 2009	Kitt Peak	Spacewatch	·	2.8 km	MPC · JPL
594817	2018 FS_{22}	—	November 26, 2005	Kitt Peak	Spacewatch	·	3.0 km	MPC · JPL
594818	2018 FW_{29}	—	March 9, 2007	Mount Lemmon	Mount Lemmon Survey	EOS	1.9 km	MPC · JPL
594819	2018 GV_{2}	—	October 12, 2007	Catalina	CSS	·	620 m	MPC · JPL
594820	2018 GC_{3}	—	September 16, 2009	Catalina	CSS	·	490 m	MPC · JPL
594821	2018 GF_{5}	—	May 8, 2013	Haleakala	Pan-STARRS 1	H	340 m	MPC · JPL
594822	2018 HC_{2}	—	April 24, 2018	Mount Lemmon	Mount Lemmon Survey	H	380 m	MPC · JPL
594823	2018 LE_{5}	—	February 19, 2015	Haleakala	Pan-STARRS 1	H	360 m	MPC · JPL
594824	2018 LH_{6}	—	September 20, 2003	Palomar	NEAT	H	380 m	MPC · JPL
594825	2018 MU_{15}	—	June 17, 2018	Haleakala	Pan-STARRS 1	L4	5.7 km	MPC · JPL
594826	2018 NF_{3}	—	March 21, 2012	Haleakala	Pan-STARRS 1	H	460 m	MPC · JPL
594827	2018 NO_{28}	—	April 18, 2015	Cerro Tololo	DECam	L4	6.5 km	MPC · JPL
594828	2018 QF	—	June 17, 2010	Mount Lemmon	Mount Lemmon Survey	H	380 m	MPC · JPL
594829	2018 RN_{61}	—	November 8, 2015	Haleakala	Pan-STARRS 1	·	520 m	MPC · JPL
594830	2018 TO_{13}	—	September 10, 2007	Mount Lemmon	Mount Lemmon Survey	H	470 m	MPC · JPL
594831	2018 VB_{32}	—	December 29, 2008	Mount Lemmon	Mount Lemmon Survey	·	500 m	MPC · JPL
594832	2018 VW_{34}	—	August 22, 2014	Haleakala	Pan-STARRS 1	PHO	930 m	MPC · JPL
594833	2018 VO_{45}	—	December 29, 2008	Kitt Peak	Spacewatch	·	530 m	MPC · JPL
594834	2018 VL_{48}	—	May 23, 2001	Cerro Tololo	Deep Ecliptic Survey	·	660 m	MPC · JPL
594835	2018 VA_{61}	—	November 24, 2003	Kitt Peak	Spacewatch	·	1.1 km	MPC · JPL
594836	2018 VO_{61}	—	April 7, 2008	Kitt Peak	Spacewatch	·	900 m	MPC · JPL
594837	2018 VB_{66}	—	December 7, 1999	Kitt Peak	Spacewatch	·	610 m	MPC · JPL
594838	2018 VG_{72}	—	October 12, 2007	Kitt Peak	Spacewatch	·	770 m	MPC · JPL
594839	2018 VZ_{73}	—	October 24, 2011	Haleakala	Pan-STARRS 1	·	610 m	MPC · JPL
594840	2018 VO_{74}	—	September 3, 2000	Apache Point	SDSS	·	570 m	MPC · JPL
594841	2018 VV_{91}	—	March 18, 2010	Mount Lemmon	Mount Lemmon Survey	·	580 m	MPC · JPL
594842	2018 VJ_{92}	—	January 3, 2016	Haleakala	Pan-STARRS 1	·	530 m	MPC · JPL
594843	2018 VV_{106}	—	April 22, 2014	Catalina	CSS	·	790 m	MPC · JPL
594844	2018 VM_{108}	—	December 31, 2007	Kitt Peak	Spacewatch	·	940 m	MPC · JPL
594845	2018 VR_{109}	—	November 18, 2007	Mount Lemmon	Mount Lemmon Survey	·	970 m	MPC · JPL
594846	2018 VE_{127}	—	April 25, 2017	Haleakala	Pan-STARRS 1	·	510 m	MPC · JPL
594847	2018 XV_{16}	—	February 10, 2008	Kitt Peak	Spacewatch	·	960 m	MPC · JPL
594848	2018 XF_{21}	—	February 25, 2011	Kitt Peak	Spacewatch	·	1.3 km	MPC · JPL
594849	2018 YR_{1}	—	December 12, 2004	Kitt Peak	Spacewatch	·	1 km	MPC · JPL
594850	2018 YF_{3}	—	November 4, 2007	Mount Lemmon	Mount Lemmon Survey	·	2.2 km	MPC · JPL
594851	2018 YN_{3}	—	May 24, 2006	Kitt Peak	Spacewatch	·	880 m	MPC · JPL
594852	2019 AC_{18}	—	April 30, 1997	Socorro	LINEAR	·	2.0 km	MPC · JPL
594853	2019 AS_{23}	—	October 10, 2010	Mount Lemmon	Mount Lemmon Survey	PHO	860 m	MPC · JPL
594854	2019 AE_{25}	—	November 2, 2013	Mount Lemmon	Mount Lemmon Survey	·	1.2 km	MPC · JPL
594855	2019 AM_{26}	—	January 19, 2015	Haleakala	Pan-STARRS 1	BAR	1.3 km	MPC · JPL
594856	2019 AG_{34}	—	December 24, 2005	Kitt Peak	Spacewatch	·	1.5 km	MPC · JPL
594857	2019 AV_{35}	—	January 10, 2006	Mount Lemmon	Mount Lemmon Survey	·	1.5 km	MPC · JPL
594858	2019 AM_{36}	—	January 17, 2015	Haleakala	Pan-STARRS 1	MAR	960 m	MPC · JPL
594859	2019 AL_{39}	—	December 19, 2009	Kitt Peak	Spacewatch	·	1.6 km	MPC · JPL
594860	2019 AW_{41}	—	October 30, 2008	Mount Lemmon	Mount Lemmon Survey	HOF	2.2 km	MPC · JPL
594861	2019 AJ_{42}	—	September 23, 2004	Kitt Peak	Spacewatch	EUN	1.1 km	MPC · JPL
594862	2019 AS_{42}	—	November 26, 2014	Mount Lemmon	Mount Lemmon Survey	PHO	810 m	MPC · JPL
594863	2019 AW_{42}	—	February 1, 2009	Mount Lemmon	Mount Lemmon Survey	·	790 m	MPC · JPL
594864	2019 AT_{43}	—	September 3, 2010	Mount Lemmon	Mount Lemmon Survey	MAS	570 m	MPC · JPL
594865	2019 AX_{43}	—	January 15, 2015	Haleakala	Pan-STARRS 1	·	1.2 km	MPC · JPL
594866	2019 AG_{44}	—	February 28, 2008	Catalina	CSS	PHO	880 m	MPC · JPL
594867	2019 AW_{53}	—	April 30, 2009	Kitt Peak	Spacewatch	·	2.1 km	MPC · JPL
594868	2019 AG_{59}	—	January 2, 2019	Haleakala	Pan-STARRS 1	MRX	880 m	MPC · JPL
594869	2019 AC_{81}	—	September 23, 2017	Haleakala	Pan-STARRS 1	·	1.2 km	MPC · JPL
594870	2019 BV_{6}	—	February 12, 2002	Palomar	NEAT	PHO	880 m	MPC · JPL
594871	2019 BR_{8}	—	April 22, 2007	Mount Lemmon	Mount Lemmon Survey	·	1.5 km	MPC · JPL
594872	2019 CR	—	February 4, 2019	Haleakala	Pan-STARRS 1	centaur	10 km	MPC · JPL
594873	2019 CJ_{7}	—	February 6, 2002	Palomar	NEAT	(5)	1.1 km	MPC · JPL
594874	2019 CQ_{8}	—	November 19, 2009	Kitt Peak	Spacewatch	·	1.2 km	MPC · JPL
594875	2019 CB_{9}	—	October 7, 2008	Mount Lemmon	Mount Lemmon Survey	·	1.4 km	MPC · JPL
594876	2019 CQ_{9}	—	December 29, 2014	Haleakala	Pan-STARRS 1	PHO	1.2 km	MPC · JPL
594877	2019 CY_{9}	—	September 13, 2007	Mount Lemmon	Mount Lemmon Survey	·	680 m	MPC · JPL
594878	2019 CW_{10}	—	February 21, 2007	Mount Lemmon	Mount Lemmon Survey	·	560 m	MPC · JPL
594879	2019 CX_{10}	—	February 10, 2008	Mount Lemmon	Mount Lemmon Survey	LIX	2.3 km	MPC · JPL
594880	2019 EM_{3}	—	February 15, 2010	Catalina	CSS	·	1.9 km	MPC · JPL
594881	2019 FR_{3}	—	November 2, 2007	Mount Lemmon	Mount Lemmon Survey	·	1.8 km	MPC · JPL
594882	2019 FM_{4}	—	April 9, 2008	Kitt Peak	Spacewatch	·	2.4 km	MPC · JPL
594883	2019 FM_{15}	—	March 31, 2019	Mount Lemmon	Mount Lemmon Survey	·	2.6 km	MPC · JPL
594884	2019 GH_{7}	—	November 19, 2007	Kitt Peak	Spacewatch	·	2.6 km	MPC · JPL
594885	2019 GD_{9}	—	October 23, 2003	Kitt Peak	Spacewatch	HOF	2.1 km	MPC · JPL
594886	2019 GJ_{11}	—	November 16, 2006	Mount Lemmon	Mount Lemmon Survey	EOS	1.4 km	MPC · JPL
594887	2019 GM_{11}	—	May 2, 2008	Mount Lemmon	Mount Lemmon Survey	·	3.0 km	MPC · JPL
594888	2019 GC_{15}	—	February 2, 2006	Kitt Peak	Spacewatch	·	2.0 km	MPC · JPL
594889	2019 GW_{17}	—	February 28, 2008	Mount Lemmon	Mount Lemmon Survey	EOS	1.4 km	MPC · JPL
594890	2019 GF_{28}	—	October 7, 2016	Haleakala	Pan-STARRS 1	VER	2.4 km	MPC · JPL
594891	2019 GN_{41}	—	October 9, 2007	Mount Lemmon	Mount Lemmon Survey	AGN	1.1 km	MPC · JPL
594892	2019 HY	—	September 15, 2004	Kitt Peak	Spacewatch	EUP	3.4 km	MPC · JPL
594893	2019 HO_{4}	—	December 24, 2006	Kitt Peak	Spacewatch	·	3.5 km	MPC · JPL
594894	2019 JQ_{3}	—	January 8, 2010	Kitt Peak	Spacewatch	·	2.0 km	MPC · JPL
594895	2019 JW_{12}	—	March 30, 2008	Kitt Peak	Spacewatch	·	3.1 km	MPC · JPL
594896	2019 JY_{24}	—	November 21, 2005	Kitt Peak	Spacewatch	·	2.8 km	MPC · JPL
594897	2019 JW_{28}	—	November 12, 2010	Mount Lemmon	Mount Lemmon Survey	·	2.5 km	MPC · JPL
594898	2019 JM_{30}	—	February 27, 2006	Kitt Peak	Spacewatch	·	1.3 km	MPC · JPL
594899	2019 JL_{32}	—	March 9, 2011	Mount Lemmon	Mount Lemmon Survey	·	1.5 km	MPC · JPL
594900	2019 JV_{37}	—	October 3, 2015	Haleakala	Pan-STARRS 1	·	2.6 km	MPC · JPL

== 594901–595000 ==
back to top

Designation			Discovery			Properties		Ref
Permanent	Provisional	Named after	Date	Site	Discoverer(s)	Category	Diam.	Ref
594901	2019 JG_{60}	—	October 9, 2016	Mount Lemmon	Mount Lemmon Survey	·	1.8 km	MPC · JPL
594902	2019 KW_{4}	—	October 9, 2010	Mount Lemmon	Mount Lemmon Survey	L4	9.6 km	MPC · JPL
594903	2019 KZ_{4}	—	October 30, 2010	Mount Lemmon	Mount Lemmon Survey	L4 · 006	9.5 km	MPC · JPL
594904	2019 KQ_{10}	—	November 6, 2010	Kitt Peak	Spacewatch	·	3.0 km	MPC · JPL
594905	2019 LA_{4}	—	June 1, 2019	Haleakala	Pan-STARRS 1	L4	10 km	MPC · JPL
594906	2019 LV_{6}	—	April 9, 2014	Haleakala	Pan-STARRS 1	L4	8.3 km	MPC · JPL
594907	2019 NR_{38}	—	June 29, 2019	Haleakala	Pan-STARRS 1	L4	7.4 km	MPC · JPL
594908	2019 NY_{47}	—	December 2, 2010	Mount Lemmon	Mount Lemmon Survey	L4	7.8 km	MPC · JPL
594909	2019 ON_{23}	—	July 28, 2019	Haleakala	Pan-STARRS 2	L4	7.4 km	MPC · JPL
594910	2019 PQ_{30}	—	March 21, 2015	Haleakala	Pan-STARRS 1	L4	6.8 km	MPC · JPL
594911	2019 PT_{33}	—	August 4, 2019	Haleakala	Pan-STARRS 1	L4	6.2 km	MPC · JPL
594912	2019 UE_{9}	—	November 17, 2011	Mount Lemmon	Mount Lemmon Survey	L4 · 006	10 km	MPC · JPL
594913 ꞌAylóꞌchaxnim	2020 AV_{2}	ꞌAylóꞌchaxnim	January 4, 2020	Palomar	Zwicky Transient Facility	IEO +1km	2.0 km	MPC · JPL
594914	2020 BA_{86}	—	August 29, 2014	Kitt Peak	Spacewatch	NYS	790 m	MPC · JPL
594915	2020 DB_{8}	—	March 25, 2007	Mount Lemmon	Mount Lemmon Survey	·	570 m	MPC · JPL
594916	2020 FT_{12}	—	December 27, 2006	Mount Lemmon	Mount Lemmon Survey	·	1.1 km	MPC · JPL
594917	2020 GL_{5}	—	October 15, 2017	Mount Lemmon	Mount Lemmon Survey	·	1.5 km	MPC · JPL
594918	2020 GE_{6}	—	September 24, 2011	Haleakala	Pan-STARRS 1	·	1.7 km	MPC · JPL
594919	2020 GT_{6}	—	June 16, 2012	Haleakala	Pan-STARRS 1	·	1.3 km	MPC · JPL
594920	2020 GV_{7}	—	October 26, 2011	Haleakala	Pan-STARRS 1	·	2.2 km	MPC · JPL
594921	2020 HW_{13}	—	June 12, 2016	Mount Lemmon	Mount Lemmon Survey	·	1.4 km	MPC · JPL
594922	2020 HJ_{27}	—	January 22, 2015	Haleakala	Pan-STARRS 1	DOR	2.0 km	MPC · JPL
594923	2020 HV_{29}	—	October 2, 2016	Haleakala	Pan-STARRS 1	·	2.7 km	MPC · JPL
594924	2020 HL_{36}	—	August 7, 2016	Haleakala	Pan-STARRS 1	AGN	930 m	MPC · JPL
594925	2020 HS_{36}	—	April 16, 2007	Mount Lemmon	Mount Lemmon Survey	·	1.2 km	MPC · JPL
594926	2020 HM_{82}	—	January 24, 2006	Kitt Peak	Spacewatch	·	1.4 km	MPC · JPL
594927	2020 JL_{6}	—	August 27, 2014	Haleakala	Pan-STARRS 1	·	710 m	MPC · JPL
594928	2020 JE_{14}	—	April 21, 2009	Kitt Peak	Spacewatch	·	2.1 km	MPC · JPL
594929	2020 KW_{15}	—	July 5, 2003	Kitt Peak	Spacewatch	·	3.9 km	MPC · JPL
594930	2020 KX_{16}	—	October 13, 2015	Haleakala	Pan-STARRS 1	·	2.6 km	MPC · JPL
594931	2020 KY_{22}	—	May 15, 2009	Kitt Peak	Spacewatch	·	1.9 km	MPC · JPL
594932	2020 PQ_{51}	—	November 10, 2010	Mount Lemmon	Mount Lemmon Survey	L4	6.1 km	MPC · JPL
594933	2020 RY_{86}	—	January 17, 2013	Haleakala	Pan-STARRS 1	L4	6.5 km	MPC · JPL
594934	2020 YN_{7}	—	November 2, 2011	Mount Lemmon	Mount Lemmon Survey	·	1.2 km	MPC · JPL
594935	2021 AL_{14}	—	March 13, 2011	Mount Lemmon	Mount Lemmon Survey	·	1.6 km	MPC · JPL
594936	2021 EX_{2}	—	March 7, 2021	Palomar	Zwicky Transient Facility	APO +1km	1.0 km	MPC · JPL
594937	2021 FF_{31}	—	March 25, 2010	Kitt Peak	Spacewatch	·	800 m	MPC · JPL
594938	2021 GE_{13}	—	April 10, 2021	Haleakala	Pan-STARRS 2	AMO +1km	860 m	MPC · JPL
594939	2021 GH_{25}	—	April 1, 2005	Kitt Peak	Spacewatch	·	1.7 km	MPC · JPL
594940	2021 MC_{7}	—	January 28, 2007	Mount Lemmon	Mount Lemmon Survey	·	1.9 km	MPC · JPL
594941	2021 NE_{12}	—	December 16, 2007	Mount Lemmon	Mount Lemmon Survey	V	450 m	MPC · JPL
594942	2021 NS_{12}	—	January 27, 2019	Mount Lemmon	Mount Lemmon Survey	·	2.4 km	MPC · JPL
594943	2021 NG_{14}	—	August 28, 2016	Mount Lemmon	Mount Lemmon Survey	·	2.2 km	MPC · JPL
594944	2000 AY_{216}	—	January 8, 2000	Kitt Peak	Spacewatch	·	1.1 km	MPC · JPL
594945	2000 AQ_{220}	—	January 5, 2000	Kitt Peak	Spacewatch	L4	7.1 km	MPC · JPL
594946	2000 AM_{259}	—	July 27, 2011	Haleakala	Pan-STARRS 1	·	1.3 km	MPC · JPL
594947	2000 AV_{259}	—	October 22, 2006	Kitt Peak	Spacewatch	NYS	780 m	MPC · JPL
594948	2000 BZ_{11}	—	January 28, 2000	Kitt Peak	Spacewatch	·	1.6 km	MPC · JPL
594949	2000 BA_{22}	—	January 29, 2000	Kitt Peak	Spacewatch	·	850 m	MPC · JPL
594950	2000 BG_{47}	—	January 30, 2000	Kitt Peak	Spacewatch	·	2.8 km	MPC · JPL
594951	2000 CG_{69}	—	February 1, 2000	Kitt Peak	Spacewatch	·	880 m	MPC · JPL
594952	2000 CP_{99}	—	February 5, 2000	Kitt Peak	Spacewatch	·	1.5 km	MPC · JPL
594953	2000 CS_{104}	—	February 5, 2000	Kitt Peak	M. W. Buie, R. L. Millis	·	1.3 km	MPC · JPL
594954	2000 CR_{124}	—	February 3, 2000	Socorro	LINEAR	·	780 m	MPC · JPL
594955	2000 CX_{133}	—	February 4, 2000	Kitt Peak	Spacewatch	·	1.9 km	MPC · JPL
594956	2000 CM_{136}	—	February 3, 2000	Kitt Peak	Spacewatch	·	1.7 km	MPC · JPL
594957	2000 CT_{139}	—	September 14, 2007	Mount Lemmon	Mount Lemmon Survey	AGN	1.0 km	MPC · JPL
594958	2000 CN_{149}	—	February 8, 2000	Kitt Peak	Spacewatch	·	2.6 km	MPC · JPL
594959	2000 CT_{150}	—	January 10, 2008	Kitt Peak	Spacewatch	3:2 · SHU	4.1 km	MPC · JPL
594960	2000 CX_{150}	—	June 17, 2005	Mount Lemmon	Mount Lemmon Survey	·	1.2 km	MPC · JPL
594961	2000 CY_{150}	—	November 8, 2007	Catalina	CSS	·	1.9 km	MPC · JPL
594962	2000 CB_{151}	—	January 1, 2009	Mount Lemmon	Mount Lemmon Survey	·	1.8 km	MPC · JPL
594963	2000 CH_{151}	—	October 4, 2007	Kitt Peak	Spacewatch	MRX	950 m	MPC · JPL
594964	2000 CU_{151}	—	November 8, 2010	Mount Lemmon	Mount Lemmon Survey	·	870 m	MPC · JPL
594965	2000 CM_{153}	—	October 10, 2008	Mount Lemmon	Mount Lemmon Survey	·	790 m	MPC · JPL
594966	2000 CT_{153}	—	February 28, 2014	Haleakala	Pan-STARRS 1	WIT	820 m	MPC · JPL
594967	2000 CP_{155}	—	August 29, 2005	Kitt Peak	Spacewatch	·	720 m	MPC · JPL
594968	2000 CK_{156}	—	September 25, 2009	Kitt Peak	Spacewatch	·	860 m	MPC · JPL
594969	2000 EY_{52}	—	March 3, 2000	Kitt Peak	Spacewatch	·	2.2 km	MPC · JPL
594970	2000 EV_{208}	—	March 12, 2000	Kitt Peak	Spacewatch	MAS	740 m	MPC · JPL
594971	2000 EJ_{209}	—	February 12, 2011	Mount Lemmon	Mount Lemmon Survey	·	3.0 km	MPC · JPL
594972	2000 EG_{210}	—	September 21, 2011	Haleakala	Pan-STARRS 1	ADE	1.3 km	MPC · JPL
594973	2000 EZ_{210}	—	March 11, 2005	Kitt Peak	Spacewatch	·	1.6 km	MPC · JPL
594974	2000 EJ_{211}	—	March 4, 2000	Apache Point	SDSS Collaboration	·	1.3 km	MPC · JPL
594975	2000 FT_{52}	—	March 29, 2000	Kitt Peak	Spacewatch	AGN	1.3 km	MPC · JPL
594976	2000 FL_{74}	—	September 11, 2016	Mount Lemmon	Mount Lemmon Survey	·	900 m	MPC · JPL
594977	2000 GC_{37}	—	April 5, 2000	Socorro	LINEAR	·	2.5 km	MPC · JPL
594978	2000 GX_{60}	—	April 5, 2000	Socorro	LINEAR	NYS	1.2 km	MPC · JPL
594979	2000 GD_{188}	—	January 27, 2011	Mount Lemmon	Mount Lemmon Survey	NYS	1 km	MPC · JPL
594980	2000 GZ_{188}	—	February 11, 2014	Mount Lemmon	Mount Lemmon Survey	DOR	2.2 km	MPC · JPL
594981	2000 JV_{94}	—	March 1, 2011	Mount Lemmon	Mount Lemmon Survey	·	1.2 km	MPC · JPL
594982	2000 JA_{95}	—	June 24, 2014	Haleakala	Pan-STARRS 1	·	660 m	MPC · JPL
594983 Stéphaniecôté	2000 KE_{84}	Stéphaniecôté	May 24, 2000	Mauna Kea	C. Veillet, D. D. Balam	·	1.8 km	MPC · JPL
594984	2000 LP_{1}	—	June 3, 2000	Haleakala	NEAT	PHO	1.4 km	MPC · JPL
594985	2000 OZ_{64}	—	July 31, 2000	Cerro Tololo	Deep Ecliptic Survey	·	1.7 km	MPC · JPL
594986	2000 OX_{66}	—	July 31, 2000	Cerro Tololo	Deep Ecliptic Survey	·	1.0 km	MPC · JPL
594987	2000 OG_{70}	—	April 13, 2011	Mount Lemmon	Mount Lemmon Survey	·	950 m	MPC · JPL
594988	2000 OV_{71}	—	April 13, 2011	Mount Lemmon	Mount Lemmon Survey	EUN	860 m	MPC · JPL
594989	2000 OP_{72}	—	May 7, 2014	Haleakala	Pan-STARRS 1	·	1.5 km	MPC · JPL
594990	2000 PP_{33}	—	January 26, 2012	Mount Lemmon	Mount Lemmon Survey	·	420 m	MPC · JPL
594991	2000 PT_{33}	—	January 14, 2002	Kitt Peak	Spacewatch	·	560 m	MPC · JPL
594992	2000 PH_{34}	—	August 1, 2000	Cerro Tololo	Deep Ecliptic Survey	KOR	1.2 km	MPC · JPL
594993	2000 QJ_{236}	—	August 26, 2000	Cerro Tololo	Deep Ecliptic Survey	EOS	1.2 km	MPC · JPL
594994	2000 QA_{243}	—	August 25, 2000	Cerro Tololo	Deep Ecliptic Survey	plutino	167 km	MPC · JPL
594995	2000 QH_{255}	—	April 19, 2015	Kitt Peak	Spacewatch	·	930 m	MPC · JPL
594996	2000 QJ_{255}	—	August 10, 2007	Kitt Peak	Spacewatch	·	660 m	MPC · JPL
594997	2000 QA_{256}	—	November 27, 2013	Haleakala	Pan-STARRS 1	·	950 m	MPC · JPL
594998	2000 QJ_{257}	—	August 26, 2000	Cerro Tololo	Deep Ecliptic Survey	·	540 m	MPC · JPL
594999	2000 QB_{259}	—	December 17, 2007	Kitt Peak	Spacewatch	THM	1.4 km	MPC · JPL
595000	2000 RF_{19}	—	September 1, 2000	Socorro	LINEAR	·	950 m	MPC · JPL

back to top

== Meaning of names ==
As minor planet discoveries are confirmed, they are given a permanent number by the IAU's Minor Planet Center (MPC), and the discoverers can then submit names for them, following the IAU's naming conventions. The list below concerns those minor planets in the specified number-range that have received names, and explains the meanings of those names.

Official naming citations of newly named small Solar System bodies are approved and published in a bulletin by IAU's Working Group for Small Bodies Nomenclature (WGSBN). Before May 2021, citations were published in MPC's Minor Planet Circulars for many decades. Recent citations can also be found on the JPL Small-Body Database (SBDB). Until his death in 2016, German astronomer Lutz D. Schmadel compiled these citations into the Dictionary of Minor Planet Names (DMP) and regularly updated the collection.

Based on Paul Herget's The Names of the Minor Planets, Schmadel also researched the unclear origin of numerous asteroids, most of which had been named prior to World War II. This article incorporates text from this source, which is in the public domain: SBDB New namings may only be added to this list below after official publication as the preannouncement of names is condemned. The WGSBN publishes a comprehensive guideline for the naming rules of non-cometary small Solar System bodies.

Named minor planet	Provisional	This minor planet was named for...	Ref · Catalog
594012 Bulavina	2016 EQ_{87}	Daria Arturovna Bulavina (born 1988), a Russian photographer and member of the Union of Artists of Russia.	IAU · 594012
594032 Reyhersamuel	2016 EF_{201}	Samuel Reyher (1635–1714), a German mathematician and astronomer at Kiel University, where he was first to introduce astronomy as a scientific discipline.	IAU · 594032
594782 Kacperwierzchoś	2017 YV_{15}	Kacper Wierzchoś (born 1988), a Polish astronomer with the Catalina Sky Survey, who is a discoverer of minor planets and comets including the co-discovery of Earth's temporary satellite, 2020 CD3 (Src, WP-pt).	IAU · 594782
594913 ꞌAylóꞌchaxnim	2020 AV_{2}	ꞌAylóꞌchaxnim means "Venus Girl" in the language of the Luiseño people who are indigenous to the coastal area of southern California where the discovering Palomar Observatory is located. The name alludes to the fact that the orbit of this asteroid is entirely contained within that of the planet Venus.	IAU · 594913
594983 Stéphaniecôté	2000 KE_{84}	Stéphanie Côté, Canadian astronomer.	IAU · 594983
