= Hội Yến Diêu Trì =

Religious ceremony of Cao Dai

Hội Yến Diêu Trì (Holy Banquet for Great Mother and the Nine Goddesses), a great religious ceremony of Cao Dai, is annually held in Tây Ninh Holy See on the 15th of the eighth lunar month. This coincides with the Tết Trung Thu in Vietnam. Most Caodaiists choose to go on a pilgrimage to Tay Ninh Holy Land on this day.

== Origin ==
Hội Yến Diêu Trì originated in an event in 1925 when Cao Quỳnh Cư, Phạm Công Tắc and Cao Hoài Sang, through spirit communications, could contact with many spirit entities. First, they got messages from their deceased relatives, then the Goddesses, and eventually God. Instructed by God, they had a vegetarian meal to entertain Great Mother (Mẫu) and the Nine Goddesses. At present, a great annual religious ceremony is held to commemorate it.

== Ceremony ==
The ceremony is held in The Temple of Acknowledgment, which has been temporarily used as The Temple of Great Mother. There are many religious activities on this occasion in Tay Ninh Holy See.

- There is a procession of carriages decorated with flowers, traditional lion dances and Caodaiists in the area of the Holy See.
- This is also a festival for women with vegetarian cooking competitions.
- Children, too, attend a lantern competition and receive moon cakes, for this day coincides with the Tết Trung Thu.
- Especially and solemnly, the service to worship Great Mother and the Nine Goddesses takes place at midnight.

== Religious significance ==
Cao Dai believers are taught that Hội Yến Diêu Trì contains an esoteric practice that helps them to achieve their goal – to liberate themselves from the cycle of birth and death.
