= Cao Dai diaspora =

Global following of the Vietnamese syncretic religion

Cao Đài is a Vietnamese religion that emerged during the French colonial period of the 1920s. Caodaism is famous for its feature of syncretising significant religions’ doctrinal teachings into its plethora of ideas. The beliefs include Buddhism, Taoism, Confucianism, Christianity, and Islam, and claimed of receiving spiritual directions from its prominent figures such as Mary, the biblical Noah, and the Buddha. The religion quickly gained followers by the millions, within a decade of propagation, attracting both the rural peasants and the French-educated urbanites.

Soon after, Caodaism began to attract attention from various political actors due to its insurgent ideas which eventually saw some of its factions participating in an armed insurgency against the French, the Japanese and the Communists until the 1950s. As a result, the religion was demilitarised, its leaders incarcerated, and followers suppressed under the different political regimes, which attributed to the fall of its influence within society. As the communist forces gained total control after Saigon’s fall in 1975, religious persecution towards the Caodaists intensified, and the religion was officially banned. As the main Tây Ninh Holy See and other sites were deeply militarised and their external religious practices prohibited, it almost seemed that the religion would disappear with no successive generation of leaders to lead it. Many of its followers went underground to survive, while others sought refuge abroad from religious persecution, thus creating diaspora communities in countries across the world. Following the period of economic reform in the 1990s, Caodaism was able to resurrect its public presence through the reopening of its temples as religious presence regained state legitimacy. However, the controversial seance practice remains prohibited until today.

== Diaspora communities ==
Of the approximate 4 million followers worldwide, the Cao Đài diaspora community today hosts 13,000 to 15,000 members in countries like the USA, Australia and Cambodia. Except for Cambodia, which has had a Caodaist presence in its state since the religion’s formative years in the 1920s, most of those in exile were boat refugees who came between 1975 and 1985 and are primarily situated in the US and Australia. Despite its relatively small number, the diaspora community holds a significant position in the development of contemporary Caodaism today.

=== Cambodia ===
Cao Đài followers were already present in Cambodia from the initial years of the religion and were mainly situated in Phnom Penh. Focusing on Caodaism’s veneration of Mother Goddess, the early settlers built the Kim Bien House of Gratitude (Báo Ân Đường) for the Mother Goddess on Pierre Pasquier Street in central Phnom Penh, Cambodia. By 1927, successful proselytisation by the Vietnamese settlers had brought many Khmers into its influence, who became attracted to Caodaism through the shared veneration of the goddess figure, which facilitated their ease of conversion. As numbers grew, the new Cao Đài community began constructing the second Mother Goddess House of Gratitude during the same year. It was also known as the “Mother Goddess House of Worship of Toul Svay Prey”. Soon after, the land adjacent to the Kim Bien House was purchased by Caodaists to construct the first Cao Đài God Temple, which was completed in 1937. Together, these buildings were referred to as the Kim Bien Temple and were officially inaugurated on 22 May 1937 by Phạm Công Tắc, the co-founder of the religion, and other prominent Cao Đài personalities.

The temple quickly became the centre of missionary activities. It was here that Phạm Công Tắc and other Caodaists received a seance spirit message from Victor Hugo’s spirit, ordering the establishment of the Cao Đài Foreign Mission. The new mission became the link that connected the Khmer community with the local Vietnamese followers and the Cao Đài Tây Ninh Holy See in Vietnam.

Veneration of goddesses among the Khmers was popular in the southern region of Vietnam and Cambodia, such as the veneration of Neang Khmau (Black Lady). The sacred pilgrimage site of Black Lady mountain was located near the Cao Đài Tây Ninh Holy See; thus, the Khmers were significantly involved in the Holy See’s construction as they would gain better access to their pilgrimage site through this new construction and its facilities. The Cao Đài leaders acknowledged the contribution of the Khmers towards the nascent religion. In return, they were awarded a designated space for the Khmer followers (Tông Đạo Tồn Nhân) in the Holy See and the permission to build the Kim Bien Temple (Tông Đạo Kim Biên) in Cambodia. As the number of Khmer Caodaists increased, the new community began to face opposition from its royal Theravada-Buddhist family in Cambodia, who declared a prohibition on Khmers visiting the Holy See and other Cao Đài centres local and abroad as it is seen as a threat to their authority over the Khmers. However, as the French were still in control of Indochina, this ruling was not strictly implemented, allowing more Khmer to embrace Caodaism. However, the transethnic connection was severed by the 1950s due to socio-political conflicts between both countries and subsequent nation-building periods, which oversaw increased tension between the Vietnamese and the Khmers. The newly-minted Cambodian government even forced the relocation of the Kim Bien temple in 1955 to diminish the Vietnamese religion’s influence. Due to the diplomatic moves between Pham Cong Tac, who was already in exile in Cambodia, in his negotiation with King Sihanouk, the Cao Đài community managed to get a hold of vacant land on Mao Tse Tong Boulevard, and construction of the new temple began by 1955. Despite facing numerous demolition threats by the Cambodian government for unauthorised construction, the building was finally ready by 1962 after the royal intervention by Prince Sihanouk’s mother.

The political upheavals in the 1970s in Vietnam and Cambodia have impacted the Cao Đài community significantly. Under the Lon Nol and Pol Pot regimes, anti-Vietnamese sentiments were invoked, and the Vietnamese diaspora in Cambodia was almost eradicated; they were either expelled or killed. The local Cao Đài community were also gravely affected as their centres were forcibly closed except for the main Kim Bien Temple. Later in the late 1980s, the community was further suppressed under the Cambodian government’s nationalisation movement, which denied citizenship towards non-Khmer people. This resulted in the severe social, economic and political marginalisation of the Vietnamese Cao Đài diaspora and the maintenance of its main temple. Without any political leverage, the Cao Đài diaspora continued to lose their plots of land to the state by 1991. Rising anti-Vietnamese sentiment kept them from voicing their grievances for fear of violent retaliation from the larger community. This marked the end of Khmer Caodaist converts.

Since the official recognition of the Caodaism as an indigenous religion in Vietnam in 1997, the Cambodian diaspora community have declared their allegiance to the main Tây Ninh Holy See and seek political protection from it against the ethnic discrimination, they continue to face in Cambodia. Positioning itself as the younger subordinate to the Holy See’s central power, the diaspora Tim Bien Temple members placed great importance in submitting themselves to Vietnam and the Tây Ninh Holy See. Today, 2000 Caodaists reside in Cambodia, most of which are of Vietnamese origin or descendants of Khmer converts.

=== The USA ===
The Vietnamese Cao Đài diaspora began to settle in the USA in 1975, primarily as refugees escaping the socialist regime after Saigon’s fall. Like many refugees who deal with forced migration, the Cao Đài Vietnamese diaspora community had been transplanted into a foreign land, unfamiliar to their culture, lifestyle and religious tradition. For Caodaists, religion became a core component in maintaining an ethnic connection with their Vietnamese counterparts. The religion’s nationalist teachings had to be modified as they lost their homeland through the exile experience.

Upon arrival, the Vietnamese Caodaist refugees were mistaken for Buddhists or Confucians as their religion was mainly unknown in the West. They also experienced the Christian missionary movement as Christian families sponsored many in the integration process into American society. As a token of appreciation, many Caodaists became nominal Christians while maintaining their indigenous belief in private. However, this faith-switching practice proved difficult while navigating their new lives (finding jobs, learning English) and dealing with the trauma of losing their ethnic identity after being forcefully uprooted from their land and culture. The desire to keep their religious tradition alive intensified as they continued to meditate privately and observe vegetarianism. Despite being in a land of religious freedom, the Cao Đài diaspora community encountered marginalisation based on their ethnicity and minority religious position. Through contact with a multicultural, multiethnic, and religiously diverse society, the Cao Đài community has seen itself as part of the modern development of religious expression, less displaced for its syncretistic character.

This experience by the diaspora in the 1980s set the tone for the Cao Đài community’s future as they slowly revived their religious presence in public through the construction of many temples across the U.S., most notably in California. Hosting nine Cao Đài temples, California is home to 90% of the Caodaists in the country, with 1350 followers in 2010. Most follow Tây Ninh Caodaism, as reflected in the five temples associated with this denomination, namely: the Chestnut, California, San Jose, San Diego, and Sacramento Cao Đài temples, while two are non-denominational but are led by Tây Ninh Caodaists, namely the Anaheim temple and the Pomona temple. The Vietnamese Cao Đài diaspora in the USA also continue the veneration of the Mother Goddess, similar to their Cambodian counterparts and altars dedicated to her can be found in the San Jose and Chestnut temple in northern and southern California, respectively.

== Direction of the community ==
The exile experience has also brought two significant impacts to the religion and its community. The first is the globalisation of the faith and the second is the reconstruction of its doctrinal practices abroad. The reformulation of its direction from fighting for nationalism to embracing a global call to suit the new context that the diaspora communities found themselves in. This enabled the continuation of the religion outside of its homeland and the possibility of gaining new adherents outside of the Vietnamese ethnicity. The diaspora community in California is generally divided into two factions, each with leaders of different aspirations for their communities.

=== Exclusivist – religion in exile ===
One side of the coin takes an exclusivist stance to protect the community from the West’s harmful influences that could degenerate its religious values. Seeking to maintain the purity of the religion in exile, these Cao Đài leaders focus on inculcating traditional values such as prioritising the community over individuals and respecting one's elders. A solid connection is maintained with the groups in its homeland, such as maintaining a strong affiliation to the Tây Ninh Holy See, further highlighting the importance of the Holy Land connection among the exiled members. This group tends to be conservative in its response to adaptation and changes within the religion and see themselves as similar to the Israelites facing the Exodus.

=== Inclusivist – universal faith in unity ===
The other side aspires for a universal identity that is inclusive to all and is welcoming to innovative ideas within the religion to suit the time and space of the diasporic experience. Using modern technologies, this group has produced English-medium religious and educational content and disseminated it through cable television, blogs, and publications both on- and offline. Citing inspiration from the other syncretic religions such as the Baha’i faith and exiled religious community of Tibetan Buddhism, the community sees hope in the survival and thriving of its people in the new land.

=== New adaptations ===
==== Female spirit mediums and newfound practices ====
As the Tây Ninh Holy See activities became strictly policed after the fall of Saigon in 1975 and the subsequent banning of public practice of Caodaism, many official positions were forcefully vacated. This, in turn, allowed the diaspora communities to appoint their spirit mediums and officials to oversee their religious affairs. This period witnessed the increase of women's participation in the formal hierarchy of overseas Caodaism and saw the rise of women spirit mediums. This phenomenon is not entirely new, as the religion upholds the concept of yin and yang. Before the exile, the Jade Emperor or Cao Đài represented masculine energy and its appointment of male officials into the hierarchy was an expression of yang. However, Cao Đài changed his expression to represent the feminine yin by appointing female mediums to suit the time when the religion was relegated to the underground and meditation and seances were held privately.

This newly-revived feminine approach to the religion is shown in the construction of the Thiên Lý Bửu Tòa (Court of Heavenly Reason) temple in San Jose, the first temple in California which was founded by the female spirit medium Bách Điều Hòa and run by a female archbishop. Bách Điều Hòa's centre initiated a new denomination which ordains American-born Caodaist as clergy independent of Vietnamese consent and are active in conducting domestic and international Cao Đài conferences. Her moves towards the localisation of the religion were not without support. It is claimed that she was directed and her directions approved by the spirits. As a female spirit medium, she was equally connected with the past spiritual leaders who had contacted other Caodaist male mediums and received a total of 54 messages. Some of them came from the Jade Emperor, Jesus Christ and Buddha. Interestingly, her temple also had new contact with a new American spiritual leader, the founder of Mormonism, Joseph Smith. This inaugurated a new spiritual direction from another Western leader, after Victor Hugo and Joan d’Arc.

Like other Vietnamese Americans, the Cao Đài community also celebrates Vietnamese cultural festivities such as Tet and the Mid-Autumn Moon Festivals. The community has also organised new celebrations to represent their diasporic experience, such as the anniversary celebration of “Black April” of 30 April 1975 in remembrance of the national tragedy of the fall of Saigon. This celebration takes a religious turn as temples prepare their own sets of prayers for the day and display the former Saigon regime’s flag at its exterior. Some may interpret this display as an anti-communist critique of the current socialist regime. Another perspective is to understand the sacralization of a political flag as a way of mourning for the loss of authority and the homeland. As the Saigon regime no longer exists, it is treated like any deceased ancestor of the community who would be remembered and mourned for. Close contact between the Cao Đài community and Christians has allowed certain Christian practices to influence the ritual practices of the diaspora community, such as holding communal prayers and meditative sessions on Sundays, instead of the traditional prayer time of the new moon and full moon of the lunar religious calendar and adopting the concept of Sunday school to provide spiritual and language classes for its members.

==== Critique of the current Tây Ninh officials ====
Despite achieving state recognition as an official religion of Vietnam, Caodaism continues to face state restrictions on the public aspect of the faith, such as the prevalent banning of seances in the temples and the appointment of religious officials by the state instead of its religious body. Many in exile are concerned with the state-chosen officials who form the religious hierarchy today, whom they see as pro-government and therefore acting favourably towards the state. This has caused many to lose respect for the Holy See of Tây Ninh’s current spiritual guidance.
