= Cao Hoài Sang =

Vietnamese Caodaist

Cao Hoài Sang (1901–1971) was one of the founder figures of the Vietnamese religion Cao Đài, participating in the first Hội Yến Diêu Trì with Phạm Công Tắc and Cao Quỳnh Cư in 1925.
