= Slave Ship =

A slave ship is a vessel used to transport slaves.

Slave Ship may also refer to:

- The Slave Ship, a painting by J. M. W. Turner
- The Slave Ship, a poem by German poet Heinrich Heine (original title Das Sklavenschiff)
- Slave Ship (Jeter novel), a 1998 science fiction novel by K. W. Jeter
- Slave Ship (Pohl novel), a 1956 science fiction novel by Frederik Pohl
- Slave Ship (1937 film), starring Warner Baxter and Wallace Beery
- "Slave Ship", a song by Jolin Tsai for the 2003 album Magic

== See also ==
- Hell ship, a ship with extremely unpleasant living conditions or with a reputation for cruelty among the crew
