= Lê Văn Trung =

Pope of Caodaism (1876–1934)

Lê Văn Trung (Chữ Hán: 黎文忠; 25 November 1876 – 19 November 1934) was the first and only person to serve as Pope (Giáo Tông) of Caodaism.

Giáo Tông is a figure in Caodaism similar to that of the Pope in the Roman Catholic Church. The term Giáo Tông means “leader or head of a religious group”. Translators noticed similarities between the structural hierarchy of Caodaism and the Roman Catholic Church, and, for lack of better words or whatever reasons, borrowed terminologies such as "pope", "cardinal", "bishop", "priest", etc. In practice, Caodaism has many more ranks and titles of which there are no official English translation yet. Also, the actual Vietnamese term for “pope”, as in “The Catholic Pope”, is Giáo Hoàng.

In 1926, Trung believed a Chinese poet had contacted him during a séance to give him a religious mission in life. This led to his signing the “Declaration of the Founding of the Cao Đài Religion” on 7 October 1926. This formally announced the founding of the religion to the world. The declaration he signed affirmed principles that combined Buddhism, Taoism, Confucianism, Christianity, spiritism and others.

Before this, Ngô Văn Chiêu had declined his appointment as Pope and withdrew to represent a more esoteric form of the faith. Trung took the more exoteric approach, becoming their leader and acting Pope. After Trung's death (disincarnation) in 1934, the Venerable Phạm Công Tắc, who was also the Maintainer of the Laws/Dharma, assumed the role.
