= Ngô Văn Chiêu =

Vietnamese religious leader (1878–1932)

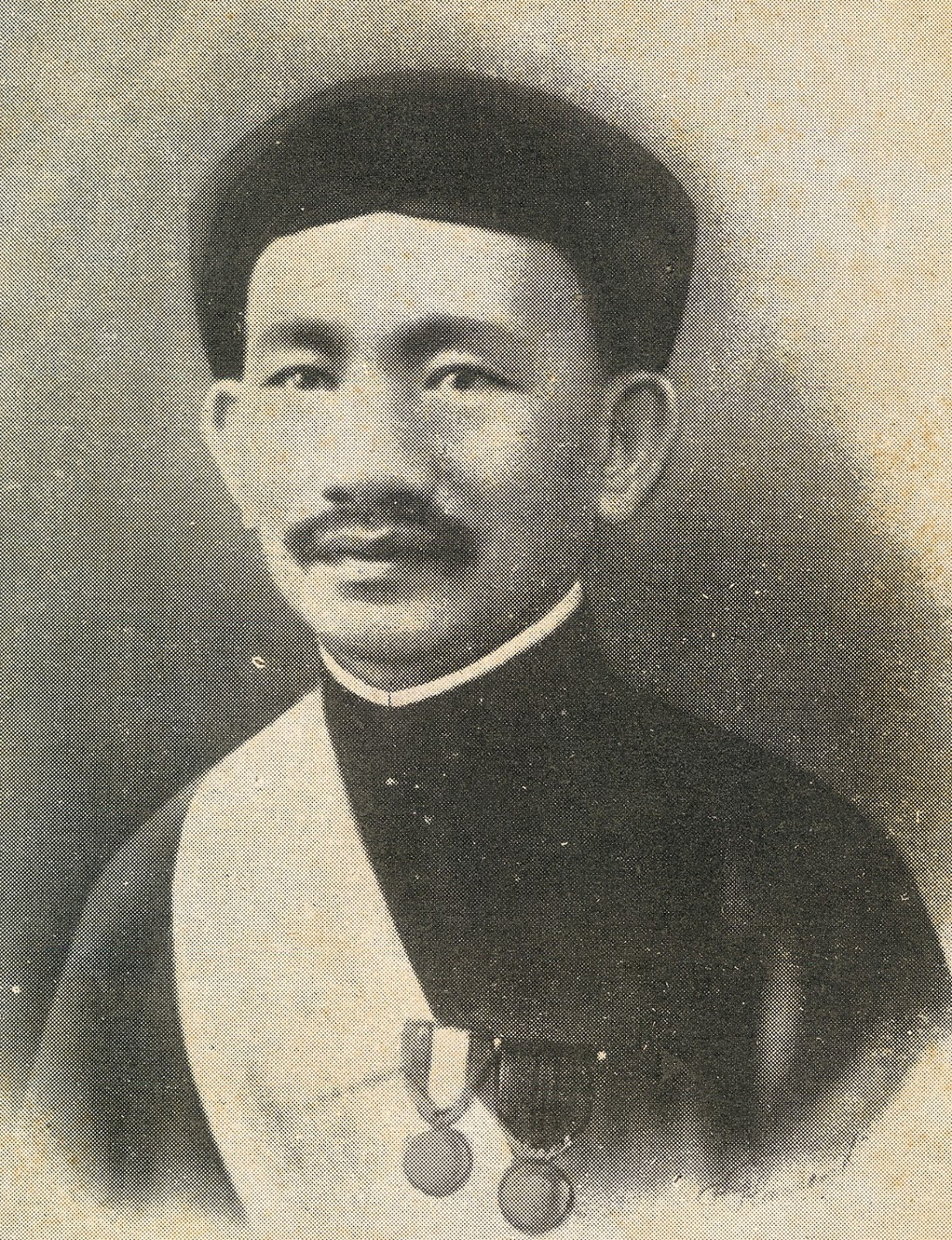
Ngô Minh Chiêu

Ngô Văn Chiêu (28 February 1878 – 18 April 1932) was the Vietnamese religious leader who was the first disciple of Đức Cao Đài.

== Life ==
He was born in 1878 and raised by his aunt and grandparents. From his uncle-in-law who was a follower of the Minh Sư (明师) tradition, he developed an interest in Chinese folk religion during this period. Later he served in the colonial bureaucracy and developed a fascination with spiritism. He declined his appointment as the first Caodaist Pope and was not involved in the official establishment of Caodaism in 1926. Instead, he chose to withdraw to a life of seclusion. Thus, the role went to Venerable Lê Văn Trung, who accepted on the condition that his title be Acting Pope.

In 1926, Lê Văn Trung and over two hundred others signed the "Declaration of the Founding of the Cao Đài Religion"; Chieu was not among the signers. He had accepted another entity as Đức Cao Đài and is credited as founder of the Chiếu Minh sect of Caodaiism. He died at 3:00 PM on 18 April 1932.
