= Cao Quỳnh Cư =

Vietnamese religious leader

Cao Quỳnh Cư (1888–1929) was one of the founder figures of the Vietnamese religion Cao Đài, participating with Phạm Công Tắc and Cao Hoài Sang in the first Hội Yến Diêu Trì to Đạo Mẫu in 1925.
