= Caodaism =

Vietnamese monotheistic religion

A sphere inside the Tây Ninh Cathedral, representing the Left Eye of God

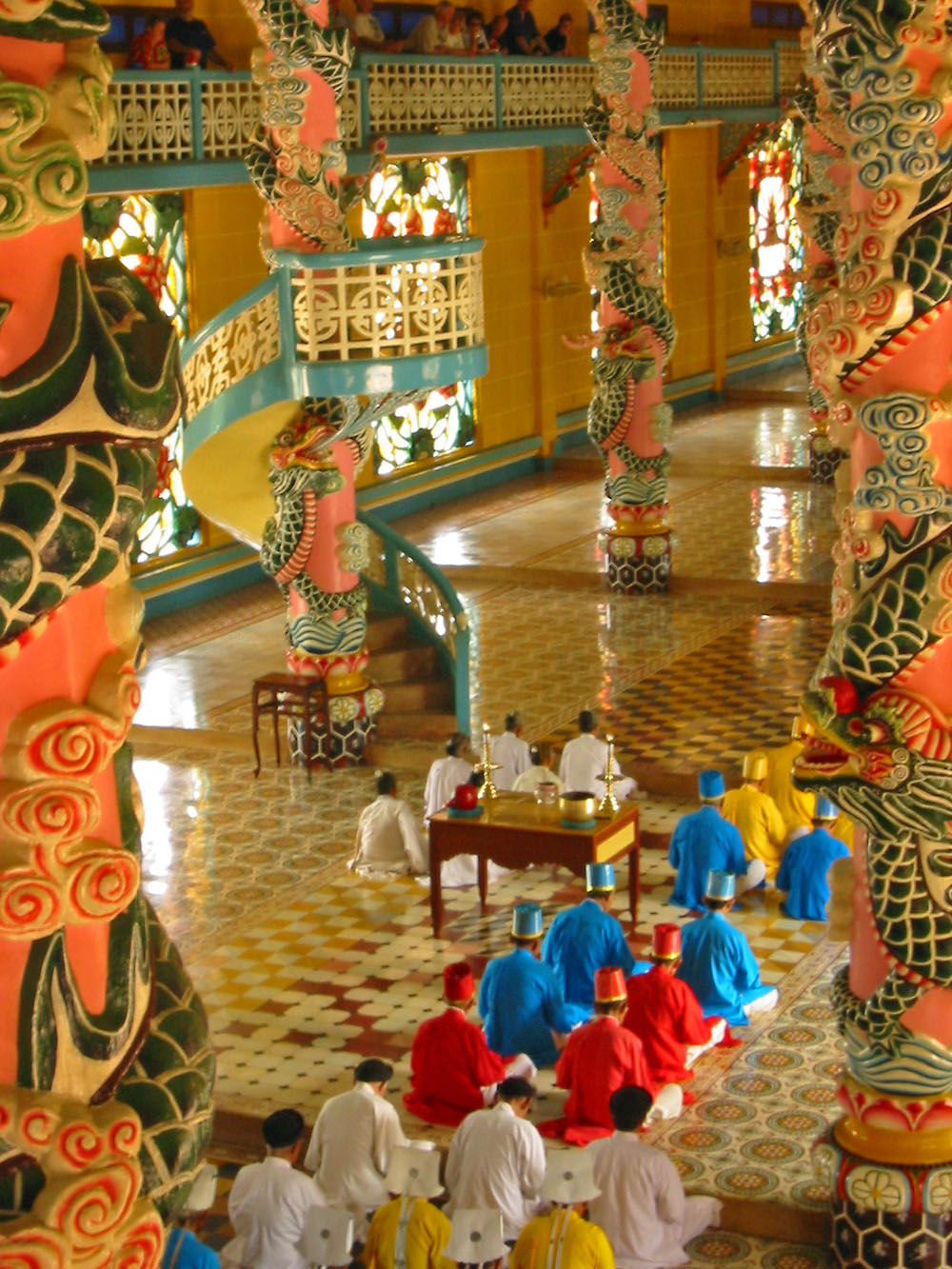
Inner hall the Caodaism Holy See, Tây Ninh Province

Caodaism (Note: /ˌkaʊˈdaɪzəm/; Vietnamese: Đạo Cao Đài; chữ Hán: 道高臺; IPA: [ʔɗaːw˧˨ʔ kaːw˧˧ ʔɗaːj˨˩]) is a Vietnamese monotheistic syncretic religion that combines "ethical precepts from Confucianism, practices from Taoism, theories of karma and rebirth from Buddhism, and a hierarchical organization from Catholicism". It was officially established in the city of Tây Ninh in Southern Vietnam in 1926.

The full name of the religion is Đại Đạo Tam Kỳ Phổ Độ (chữ Hán: 大道三期普度 'The Great Faith [for the] Third Universal Redemption').

Adherents of Caodaism engage in practices such as prayer, veneration of ancestors, nonviolence, and vegetarianism, their goal that of union with God and freedom from saṃsāra.

Estimates of the number of Caodaists in Vietnam vary; government figures estimate 4.4 million Caodaists are affiliated to the Cao Đài Tòa Thánh Tây Ninh (Cao Đài Cathedral), with up to 6 million members if other branches of the faith are considered.

The United Nations estimated about 2.5 million Caodaists existed in Vietnam, as of January 2015. An additional number of adherents in the tens of thousands, primarily ethnic Vietnamese, live in North America, Cambodia, Europe and Australia as part of the Cao Dai diaspora.

== History ==
Officially called the "Great Way of the Third Era of Redemption" (Đại Đạo Tam Kỳ Phổ Độ), it was founded in 1925 in Saigon as a Spiritualist club named AĂÂ by Cao Quỳnh Cư, Cao Hoài Sang, Lê Văn Trung and Phạm Công Tắc, a group of clerks working in the colonial government, to practice mediumship and ouija sessions. They were avid readers of medium writings of Allan Kardec, Victor Hugo and Flammarion.

During a séance in 1926, the group believed they had received a revelation message, predicting a future universal religion based on spiritist doctrines. The message gave the member Ngô Văn Chiêu a religious mission in life. This led to his signing of the “Declaration of the Founding of the Cao Đài Religion” on 7 October 1926, formally announcing the founding of Cao Đài, which soon grew into a religious movement.

Ngô Văn Chiêu, who is revered in Caodaism as the first disciple of the Đức Cao Đài, had never intended Cao Đài to become a mass organization. He disagreed with proselytization and wished to keep the practice esoteric. He declined the appointment as Pope and left the movement and eventually established an independent, esoteric branch known as Chiếu Minh, headquartered in Vĩnh Long, which still exists and only admits a limited number of committed adepts. Trung took the more exoteric approach, becoming the acting Pope (Quyền Giáo Tông). After Trung's death in 1934, the Venerable Phạm Công Tắc assumed the role.

During the 1930s, its leader criticized yet maintained good ties with the French colonial regime. This stance was controversial, and contrasted with the liturgy of dozens of "dissident" branches of Caodaism that followed a more Taoist model. By 1940, it had gathered over a million members and converting a fifth to a fourth of the population of Cochinchina and irked the French government From 1941 to 1946, Phạm Công Tắc and other Caodai leaders were arrested and jailed in French penal colonies in Madagascar.

During the First and Second Indochina Wars, members of Cao Đài (along with several other Vietnamese sects, such as Hòa Hảo) were active in political and military struggles against both French colonial forces and South Vietnamese Prime Minister Ngô Đình Diệm, who later became president.

Their criticism of the communist forces until 1975 was a factor in their repression after the fall of Saigon in April 1975, when the incoming communist government banned the practice of Caodaism. In 1997, Caodaism was granted legal recognition and unrestricted practice once again.

== Theology and theosophy ==
=== God ===
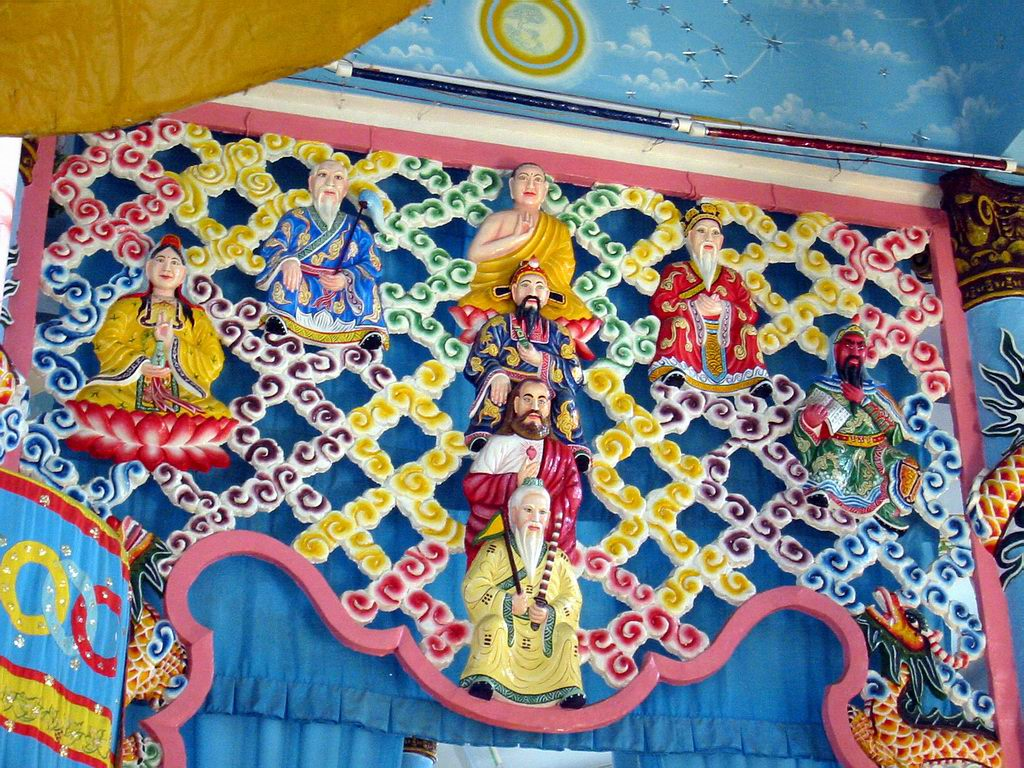
On top is Buddha, on his right Lao Tzu, on his left Confucius. Under Buddha is Li Bai. On Li Bai's left is the female Boddhisattva Guanyin, on his right is the red-faced warrior Quan Vũ (Guan Yu) . Below Li Bai is Jesus, and below Jesus is Jiang Ziya.

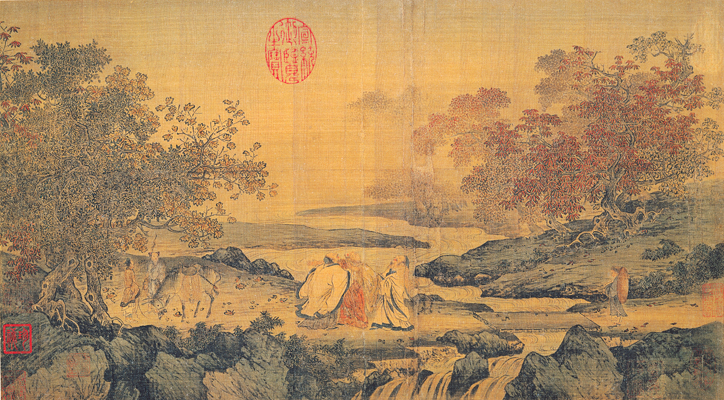
Confucianism, Taoism, and Buddhism are One, a painting in the litang style portraying three men laughing by a river stream. 12th century, Song Dynasty

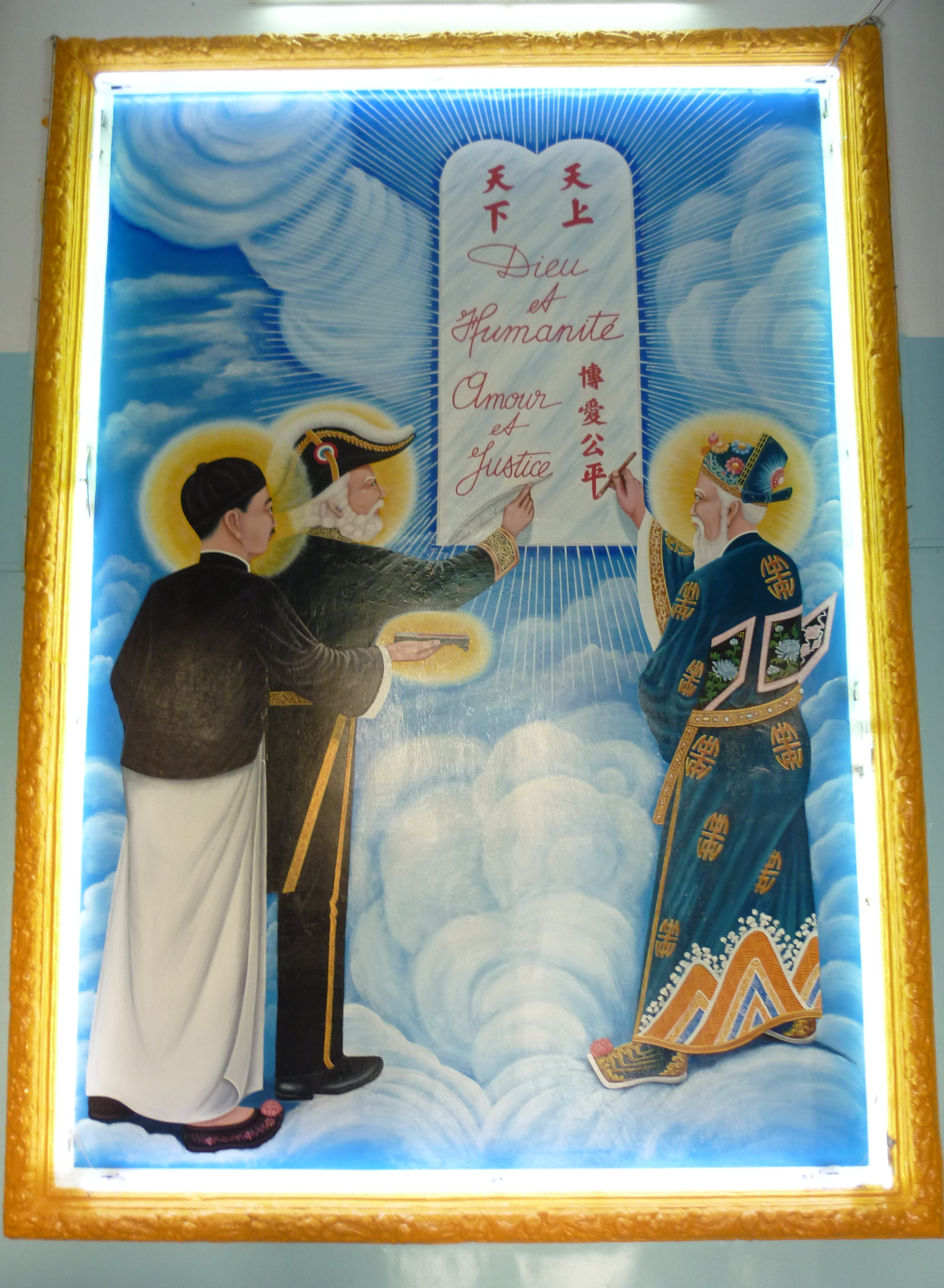
Three Saints (Victor Hugo, Sun Yat-Sen and Nguyễn Bỉnh Khiêm) and the Divine Covenant

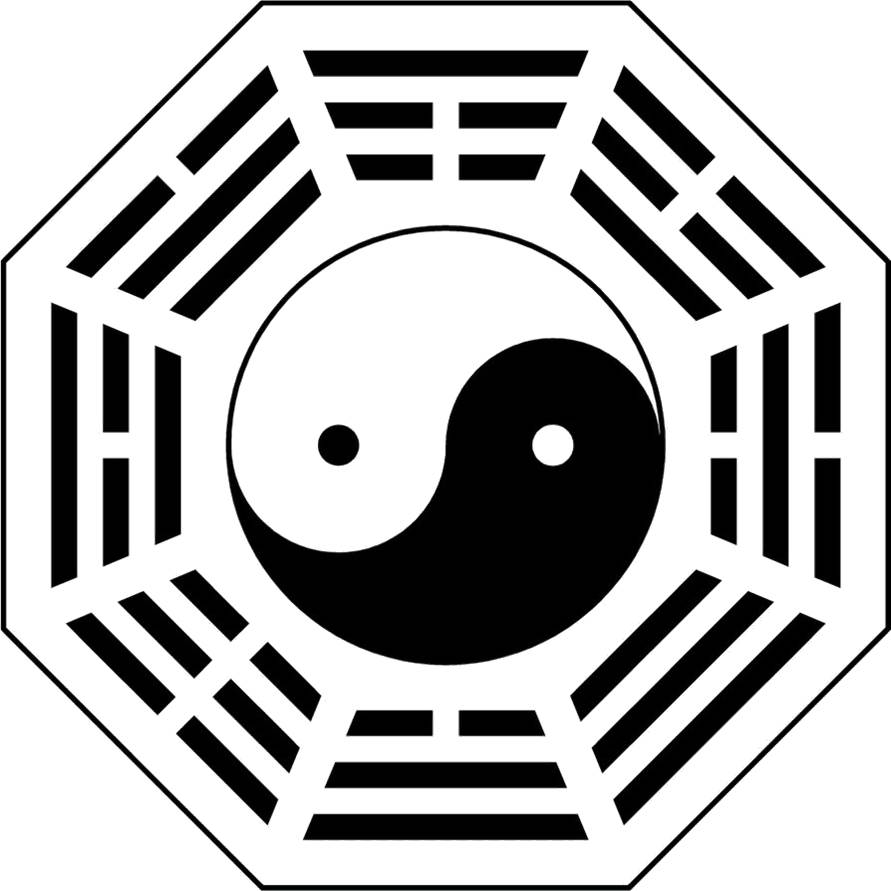
The Eight Trigrams (Bagua, 八卦) of Taoism

"Cao Đài" refers to God the Father (also known as the Supreme Being, Creator, and "Ultimate Reality of the Universe," as well as the Ngọc Hoàng). Cao Đài Tiên Ông Đại Bồ Tát Ma Ha Tát, as God's full title, indicates a combination of three religions—namely, Confucianism, Taoism, and Mahayana Buddhism—that significantly influenced Caodaist theology.

Cao Đài

Pronunciation of "Cao Đài" in Vietnamese

literally means "High Tower/Palace" (that is, the place where God reigns over the universe) represents Confucianism.

Pronunciation of "Tiên Ông" in Vietnamese

Tiên Ông
is the largest rank in Taoism.

Pronunciation of "Đại Bồ Tát Ma Ha Tát" in Vietnamese

Đại Bồ Tát Ma Ha Tát
literally means Great Bodhisattva the Great Being (Mahasattva) in Buddhism.

Together, they represent not only the unification of the three main religions but also the humility of God who presents himself as the lowest rank of Divinity.

According to Caodaism, God permeates all things in the Universe, both living and inanimate, reminiscent of Panentheism. It is believed that part of God's spirit is within all people and creatures.

God has many different names depending on each person's worldview.

Caodaism posits that all religions are derived from the same source; it is a pluralist theology. The unique name for the Caodaist deity is intended to capture the development of God's revelation throughout evolutionary history: Cao Đài Tiên Ông Đại Bồ Tá Ma Ha Tát, Chaos, Taoism, Ông Trời, Thượng Đế, Đấng Sáng Tạo, Allah, Tathāgata, Atenism, Brahma, Yahweh, Great Spirit, Waheguru, etc.

=== Cosmology ===
Caodaists adopt the traditional Chinese idea of âm (yin) and dương (yang) duality constituting the harmonious balance of the universe. Before the creation of the universe there was the "Đạo", the infinite, nameless, formless, unchanging, eternal source. The negative and positive principles of the universe are the components of the eternal nature.

There are two main Gods, the Cao Đài ("Highest Lord") and the Diêu Trì Kim Mẫu or Đức Phật Mẫu ("Holy Buddha Mother"). They represent respectively the yang and yin forces. Cao Đài is viewed as the heart of the universe, the common Father of all beings. He imparts part of him into each living being, including even rocks, in the form of consciousness. Đức Phật Mẫu is venerated as the Mother of the Universe, responsible for giving visible forms, consciousness and emotions to all life. Ultimately, she has to follow the orders of Đức Cao Đài who is revered as the Supreme Being of both Heaven and Earth.

All other Divine Beings are to obey the orders of these two Creators during the course of evolution of the universe. Each of them carries a specific role as designated by their Father and Mother. Any being who falls out against them is considered devils in nature.

In terms of the cosmos, faithful Caodaists believe there are heaven and hell, which are the main destinations for souls after death. Heaven consists of thirty-six planes and many heavenly realms upon each of them, e.g. the Realm of Saints, the Realm of the Holy Mother, the Realm of the Perfect Beings, the Divine Court Realm, the Paradise of Extreme Joy, etc. Meanwhile, hell has ten key realms to carry out punishments in accordance with sins of souls.

In order to get to heaven, souls are required to cultivate their virtues and / or devote themselves to spiritual causes. Without merit from the latter, they cannot escape the cycle of birth and death, but can improve their virtues and merit gradually to reach better places in the universe, including the 72 planets (Earth being the 68th), the 3,000 worlds, the four great cosmic regions, and the thirty six heavenly planes. True liberation can only be attained when souls ultimately rejoin God the Father in Heaven.

=== Three-fold revelation ===
The father of the universe, Cao Đài, is believed to have communed with men since the beginning of times, revealing his will. According to Cao Đài doctrine, history is divided into three times (tam kỳ) of revelation. In the first two periods, there were teachings of Dipankara Buddha, sages, Phục Hy/Fu Xi, Gautama Buddha, Laozi, Confucius and Jesus, who received the will of the Highest Power, and founded their respective religions to serve and/or educate humanity. However, due to the frailty of the messengers and the common men, the will of the Highest Power was misled into corrupted forms. Caodaists also believe that former revelations were culture-bound, being applicable only for certain ethnicities, and primarily intended for specific ages. The third and final form of revelation is disclosed through the teachings of the Cao Đài faith.

=== Twelve-fold hierarchy ===
Caodaists believe that there are various ranks of divine spirits: Thần ("Holy Spirits"), Thánh ("saints"), Tiên ("Immortals"), and Phật ("Buddhas"). Each of these ranks can be further divided in the three grades of Thiên (Heavenly), Nhân (Human) and Địa (Earthly), forming a twelve-fold hierarchy that reflects the twelve-fold earthly hierarchy of the Caodaist church. Below those ranks are the spirits of matters, plants, animals and humans. All spirits may evolve to attain higher rank based on present deeds. Disembodied spirits fulfill a number of roles: they are benefactors of mankind, messengers and instructors of the truth. Quan Âm is regarded as the exemplary goddess of the Buddhas, Lý Bạch (Li Bai) of the Immortals, and Quan Vũ (Guan Yu) of the Saints.

The Cao Đài pantheon counts three main prophets, as illustrated on a plaque at the entrance of the Tay Ninh Temple: Victor Hugo (to please the French), since he gave many teachings and also the text of a number of important prayers. He himself practiced spiritism on the island of Jersey from 1852 to 1855, and predicted that he would become the prophet of a new religion to merge European and Asian mysticism. Sun Yat-sen (for the Chinese) and Trạng Trình, the Vietnamese Nostradamus (for the Vietnamese).

== The Holy See ==
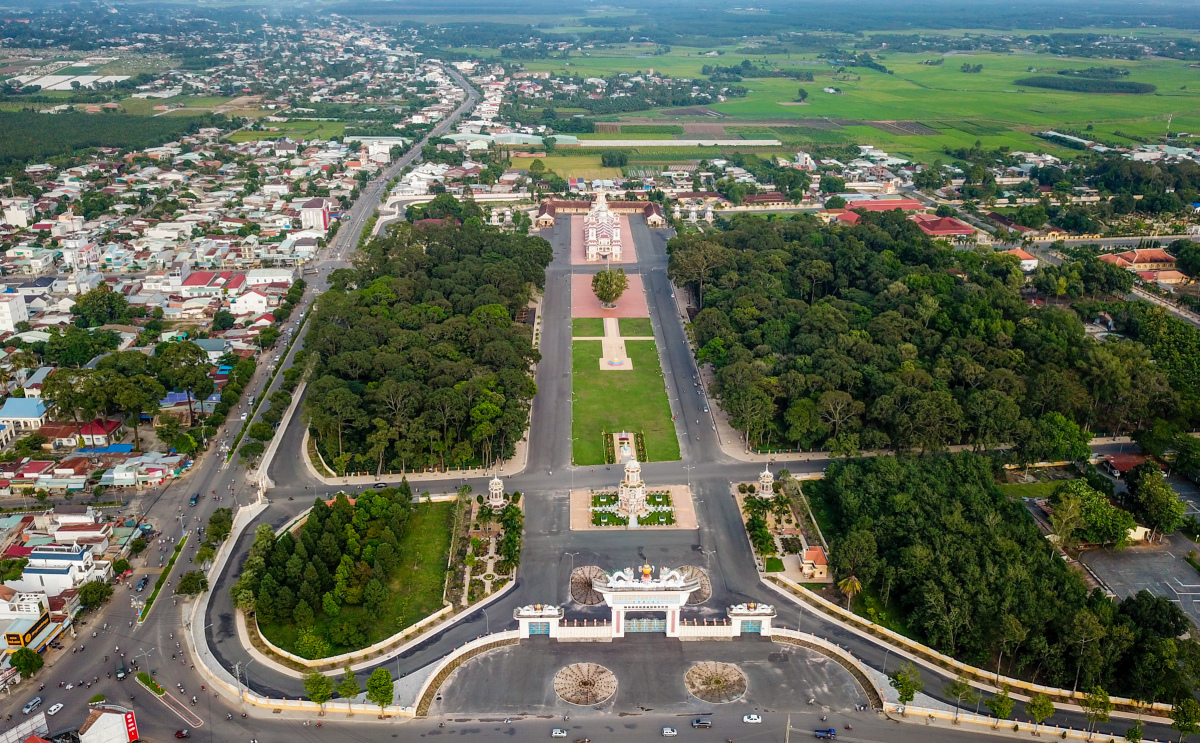
The Caodaism Holy See in Tây Ninh

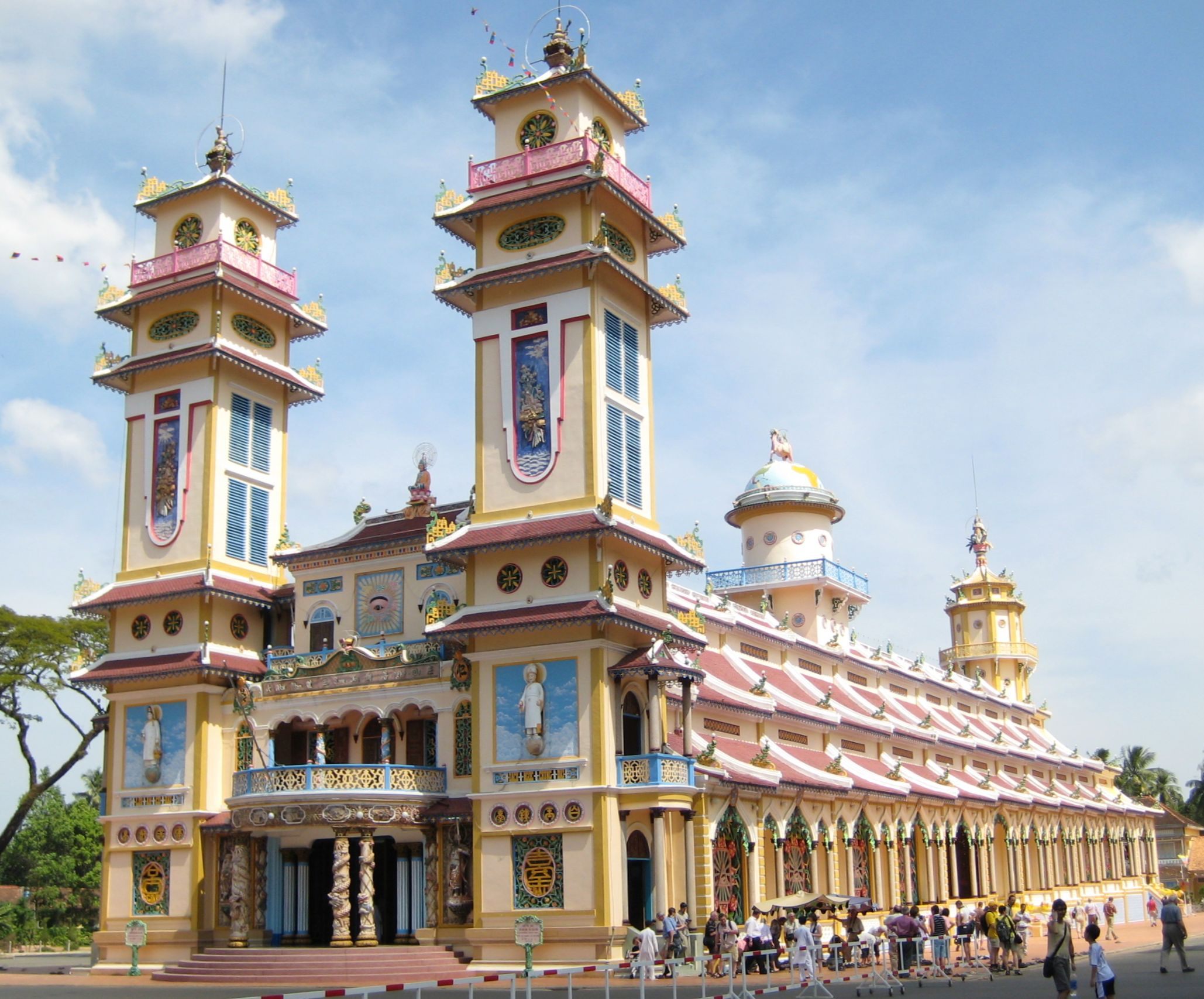
The Great Divine Temple is the main religious building in Caodaism's Holy Land; other buildings with the same functions are called temples (thánh thất).

In the city of Tây Ninh stands the Cao Dai Holy See (Tòa Thánh Tây Ninh), the Caodaist headquarter. At the heart of the religious enclave is the Great Divine Temple. Being the major center of Cao Dai pilgrimage, the Tây Ninh Holy See is one of Vietnam's major tourist attractions.

== Worship rituals and festivals ==
Monthly rituals take place at midnight on the 1st and 15th days of the lunar month. There is also a special anniversary ceremony once a year for God the Father, the Holy Mother, the five founders of the world's major religions, and the founders of the Cao Dai religion. The rituals differ between places, depending on who they pray to.

At the Holy See
Prayers include incense offering, ceremony opening, prayer to the Ngọc Hoàng (God the Father), prayer to Dipankara Buddha (Buddhism), prayer to Thái Thượng Lão Quân or Taishang Laojun (Taoism), prayer to Confucius (Confucianism), one of the three jewel offering prayers (flower, wine, and tea), and the five pledges.
At the Holy Mother temple
Prayers include incense offering, ceremony opening, prayer describing the role of the Holy Mother, prayer to express gratitude to the Holy Mother, one of the three jewel offering prayers (flower, wine, and tea), and the five pledges.

There are also differences between monthly rituals, and anniversary ones.

=== The Holy Banquet ===
Hội Yến Diêu Trì or the Holy Banquet for Great Mother and the Nine Goddesses is the most important festival of the Cao Dai community. It is annually held in Tây Ninh Holy See on the 15th of the eighth lunar month. This coincides with the Tết Trung Thu in Vietnam. Most Caodaiists choose to go on a pilgrimage to Tay Ninh Holy Land on this day.

== Symbols ==
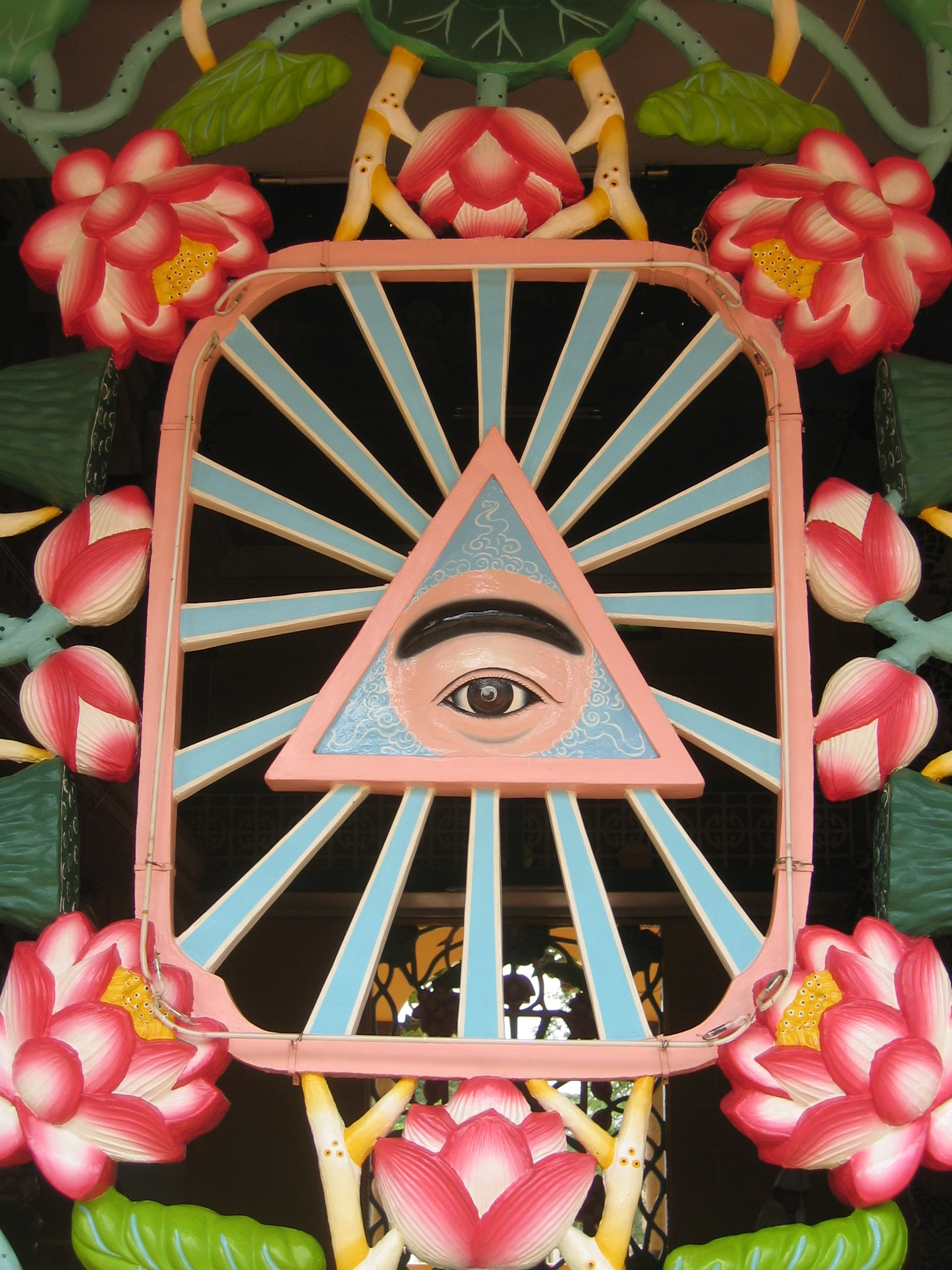
Cao Đài's left eye, similar to the Eye of Providence

The Caodaism Holy See, Caodaism Temples, and religious buildings host a rich array of symbols, all of which are instructed by either God the Father or Divine Beings. No symbol is redundant, and none is meaningless. They each tell a different story that reveals the beliefs, values, cosmic secrets, prophecies, etc. When combined, they lay out the journey of the Tao throughout the history of mankind and the universe, as well as its way forward.

=== The Divine Eye ===
In spirit and in pictorial representation, the Eye serves to remind Cao Đài believers that the God witnesses everything, everywhere, constantly. At the Holy See, there are in total 50 Divine Eyes of five different shapes; each carrying a different meaning related to various spiritual aspects. The One on the globe shows the Supreme Being above the North Star in the Ursa Minor constellation. The One on the façade of the Holy See has 35 rays of light which represent the three major religions and five main religious doctrines of the world. At the local Cao Đài Temples, the Divine Eye has 16 rays of light emanating from it. Nine radiate upward representing the nine levels of heaven, and seven radiating downward representing the seven emotions, which believers must control.

=== The religious banner and emblem ===
The Cao Đài tricolor

In accordance with the religious mission, the three colors of Cao Đài banner represent the three main non-Hinduistic Asian religions of the world; yellow stands for Buddhism, blue for Taoism, and red for Confucianism. Under the Divine Eye is the religious emblem which also represents the essence of the three religions; the bowl of charity for Buddhist compassion and asceticism, the feather duster for Taoist purification; the Spring and Autumn Annals for Confucianist virtue and love.

== Scriptures ==
There are various Caodaist scriptures. Some of those belonging to the Holy See of Tây Ninh are: Kinh Thiên Đạo Và Thế Đạo ("Prayers of the Heavenly and the Earthly Way"), Pháp Chánh Truyền ("the Religious Constitution of Cao Đài Religion"), Tân Luật ("The Canonical Codes"), and Con Đường Thiêng Liêng Hằng Sống ("Divine Path to Eternal Life").

=== The Canonical Codes ===
This scripture sets out the rules and boundaries for different aspects of the religion, from a believer to the Pope, from education to marriage, etc. There are ten sections in the scripture with the following content:

1. Hierarchy of religious dignitaries
2. Initiation and ranks of believers
3. Establishment of a parish
4. The five interdictions
5. The four commandments
6. Education
7. Sanctions
8. Promulgation of laws and regulations
9. Secular rules
10. The house of meditation

=== The Religious Constitution ===
The Pháp Chánh Truyền (The Religious Constitution of Caodaism) was delivered to the religion as a series of divine messages. These are the guiding texts of the religion's organization, stipulating the authority, responsibility, limits, as well as religious vestment for each rank in the religion.

== Organization ==
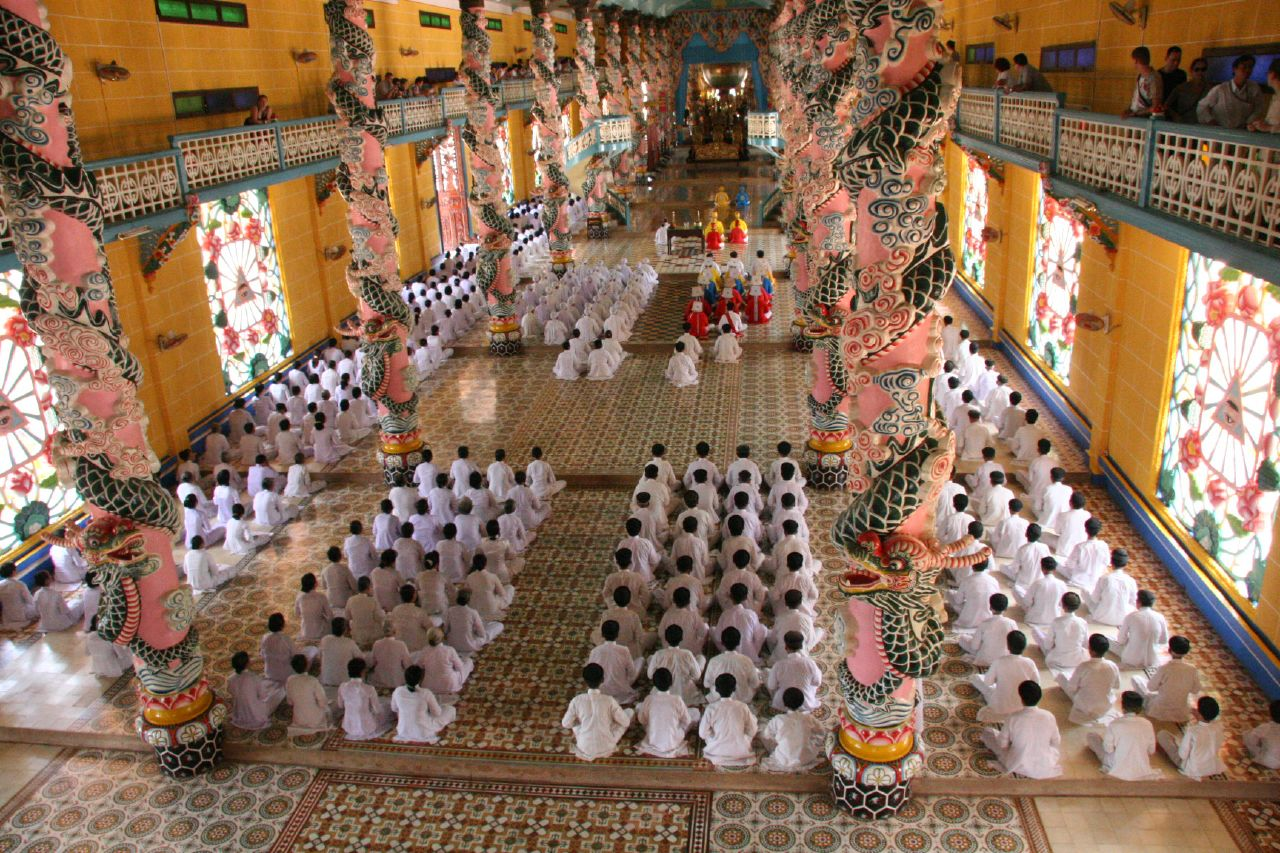
Caodaists worshipping in a temple. Priests are dressed in red, blue and yellow, followers in white.

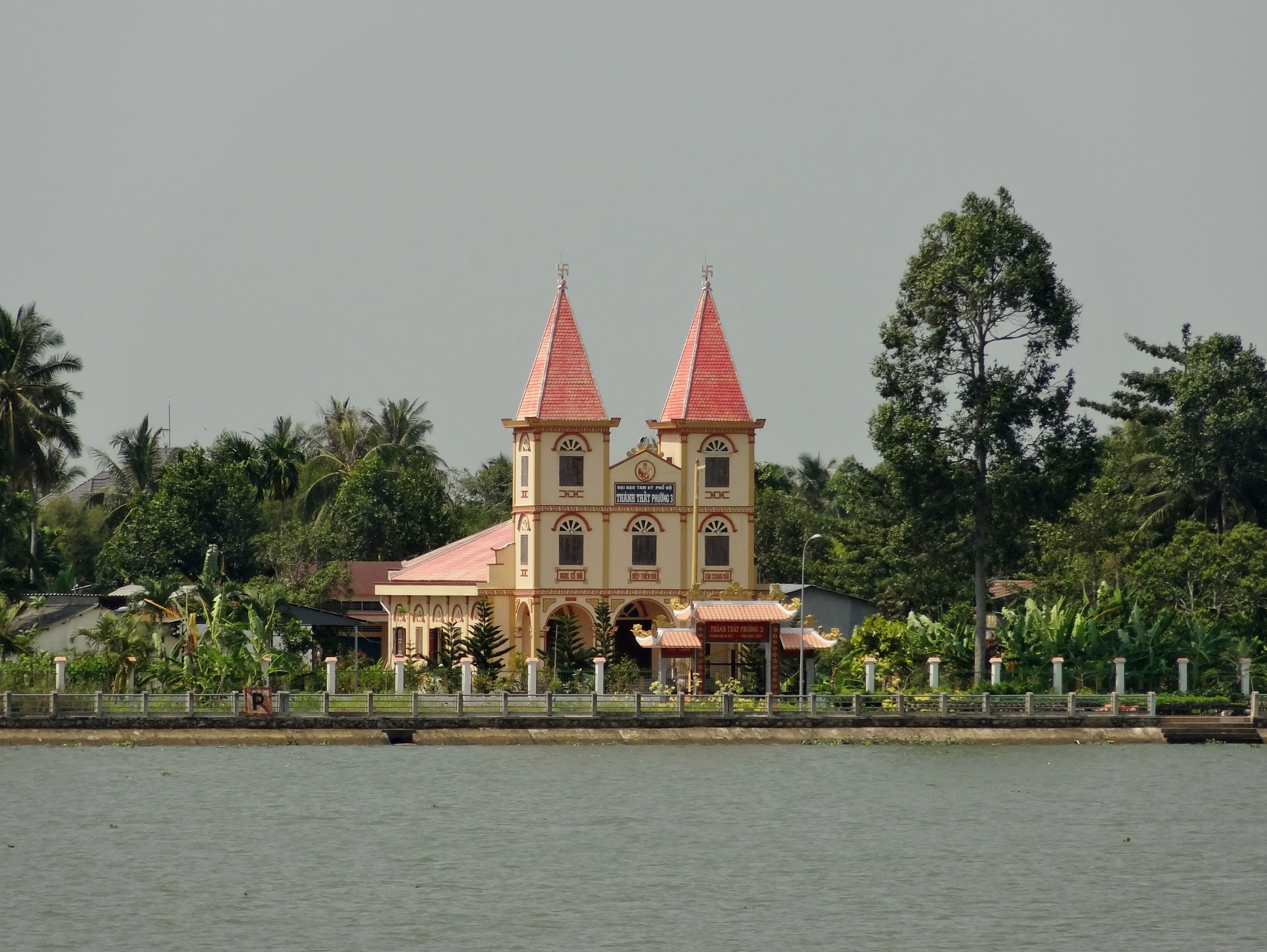
A Caodai temple in Đồng Tháp province

The organization of the Caodaist church has similarities with that of a state. There are similarities between the hierarchy of the Caodaist clergy and that of the Catholic Church. Besides the Pope, the Caodaist hierarchy has Cardinals, Bishops, Priests, and further ranks.

Caodaism stresses equality among men and women in society. However, in the spiritual domain, ordained women may not attain the two highest positions: the Legislative Cardinal and the Pope. The church claims this is ordered by the Highest Lord, who declared that because Dương (Yang) represents male and Âm (Yin) corresponds to female, Yin cannot dominate Yang spiritually or else chaos ensues.

The Religion is governed by two powers, the spiritual and earthly ones.

The spiritual power (Bát Quái Đài): This is the heavenly council, that is, the Spirit and Soul of the New Religion. The council directs all activities of the universe. The council is the invisible part, made up of the Divine Beings, and directed by Duc Cao Dai (God the Father). The Divine Beings represent different religions of the world, including:

Founders of five religions
- The Buddha (Buddhism),
- Lao Tze (Taoism),
- Confucius (Confucianism),
- Jesus Christ (Christianity),
- Jiang Ziya (Geniism). Way of the Spirits (Đạo Thần)
Founders and teachers of Caodaism
who represent the doctrines of Buddhism, Taoism, and Confucianism:
- Guanyin (Buddhism),
- Li Bai (Taoism),
- Guan Yu (Confucianism).

The earthly power: To avoid dictatorship, God divided the earthly power into two bodies – an Executive Body (Cửu Trùng Đài) headed by the Pope, and a Legislative Body (Hiệp Thiên Đài) headed by the Hộ Pháp (Protector of Laws and Justice). The former takes charge of the administration of the Religion and its missionary activities, while the latter oversees legislation, jurisdiction and communication with God or Divine Beings. There is also the Charitable Body placed under the supervision of the Legislative Body, and a Lay Committee of selected professional specialists among worthy followers.

=== The Executive Body (Cửu Trùng Đài) ===
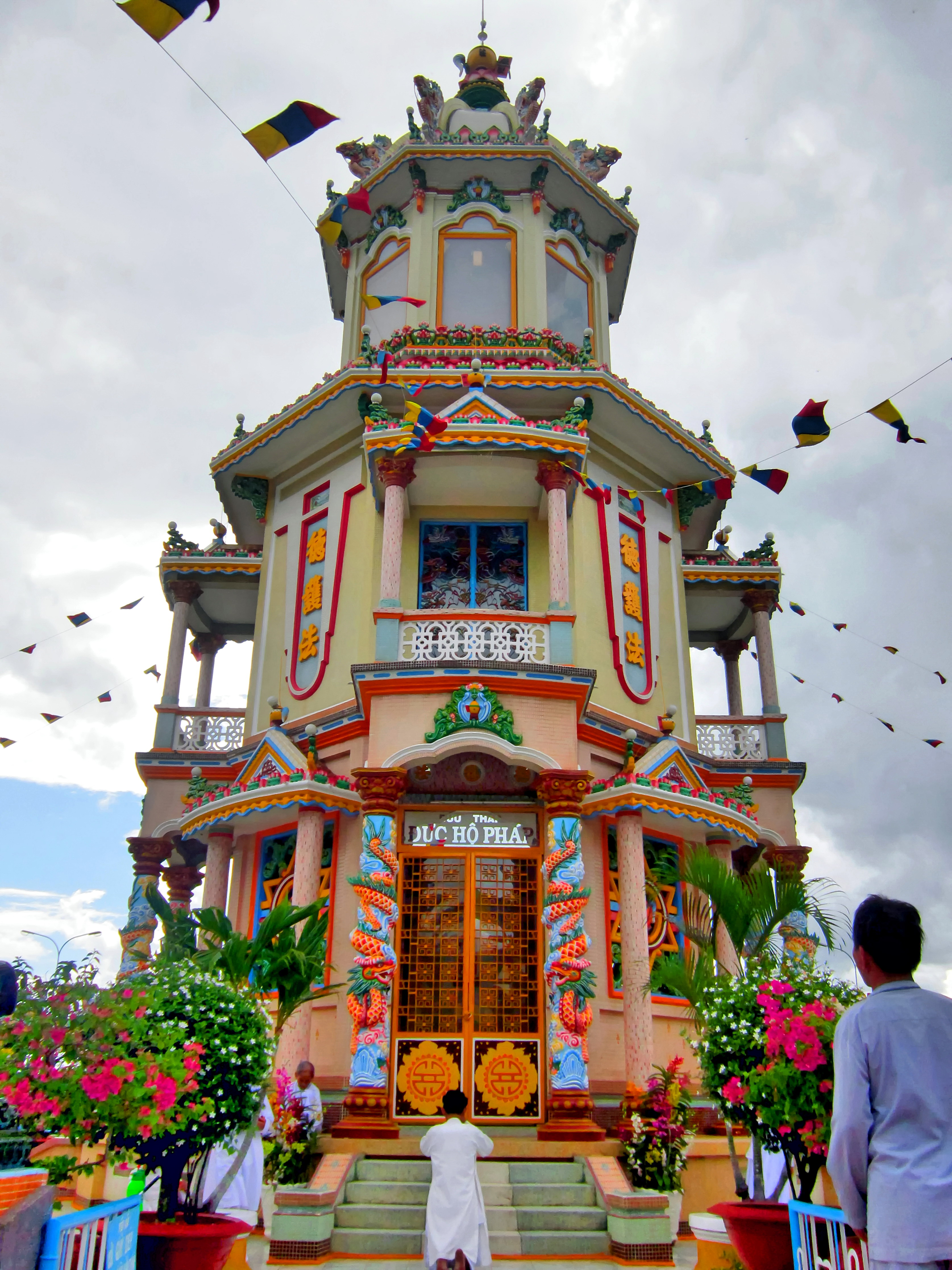
The stupa of the dharmapala Phạm Công Tắc

The Cửu Trùng Ðài is the Executive Body of Caodaism which takes charge of the administration of the Religion and missionary activities. Head of Cửu Trùng Ðài is the Giáo-Tông (Pope). The first and only officially ordained Giáo Tông of the Tây Ninh Holy See was Lê Văn Trung (1876–1934). After his death, the position of Pope was left permanently vacant, a decision reportedly guided by spiritual communication from Cao Đài instructing that no successor be named.

The Giáo-Tông (Pope) represents God to watch over the preservation of His Religion in this world. Whatever his age, he is eldest brother and acts as a guide for the children of God. The Spiritual Power has decided that this is so. The Giáo-Tông (Pope) has the same powers as God to teach Virtue to all His Disciples. He is concerned with each one of them, he guides each one and takes care to ensure that each one does not transgress the Divine Laws (Thiên Điều). He obliges all disciples of God to conform strictly to the prescriptions of the New Codes (Tân Luật) ... Since the Giáo-Tông (Pope) has full powers to replace God he must try to transform the life of suffering into an existence marked by happiness. This is the Exalted Task of the Giáo-Tông (Pope).

There are nine ranks in its hierarchy:

Number	Rank
1	Pope
3	Censor Cardinals
3	Cardinals
36	Archbishops
72	Bishops
3,000	Priests
no limit	Student Priests
no limit	Subdignitaries
no limit	Followers

For male dignitaries of the Executive Body, from the rank of Censor Cardinal to that of Student Priest, each echelon is subdivided into three branches corresponding to the three principal religions:

Buddhist Branch
These dignitaries are dressed in yellow.
Taoist Branch
These dignitaries are dressed in azure.
Confucianist Branch
These dignitaries are dressed in red.

Dignitaries of the same echelon, either Confucianist, Taoist or Buddhist, have the same attributes.

At the Holy See, there are three governing councils:

The Popular Council
composed of Student Priests, Sub-dignitaries, and representatives of adherents in the ratio of one delegate per 500 members. The Popular Council makes plans for the future.
The Sacerdotal Council
composed of Priests, Bishops, Archbishops, and Principal Archbishops. The Sacerdotal Council examines the plans made by the Popular Council.
The High Council
composed of Cardinals, Legislative Body Cardinals, and the Pope.

All plans made by the Popular Council and favored by the Sacerdotal Council are submitted to High Council for approval.

In addition, there is also a Central Administration body chaired by three Cardinals. Each of them is assisted by three Principal Archbishops to oversee three religious ministries:

The Principal Archbishops of the Buddhist branch
take care of finances, supply, and public works.
The Principal Archbishops of the Taoist branch
take care of education, health, and agriculture.
The Principal Archbishops of the Confucianist branch
take care of interior, rites, and justice.

The administrative network which functions throughout Vietnam consists of:

The Religious Region (Trấn Đạo)
comprising several provinces, headed by a Bishop who is called the Regional Religious Chief/Khâm Trấn Đạo.
The Religious Province (Châu Đạo)
comprising several districts/delegations, headed by a Priest who is called Provincial Religious Chief/Khâm Châu Đạo.
The Religious District (Họ Đạo)
comprising several villages, headed by a Student Priest who is called the Religious Chief of Delegation (Đầu Tộc Đạo/Đầu Họ Đạo/Đầu Phận Đạo).
The Religious Village (Hương Đạo)
headed by a Sub-dignitary who is called Village Religious Chief (Đầu Hương Đạo). He is assisted by one (or more) Phó Trị Sự (Deputy Chief for Administration of a religious village) representing the Executive Body and one (or more) Thông Sự representing the Legislative Body. The Religious Village is made up of Religious Hamlets (Ấp Đạo).

=== Palace Uniting Heaven and Earth (Hiệp Thiên Đài) ===
This Body has the duty of communicating with Divine Beings, to preserve the religious laws and listen to the complaints of the unhappy. It is headed by the Hộ Pháp (Defender of the Dharma, protector of laws and justice), and assisted by the Thượng Phẩm (Director of religious affairs) and Thượng Sanh (Director of secular affairs).

Hộ-Pháp (護法) (The head of Legislative Body Affairs)
unveils the Mystery of the Invisible and is the Maintainer of the Rules and Laws of the New Religion. He is the one who pronounces judgments on the dignitaries and adepts, elevates the dignity of the fervent through their merit and brings sanctions against those who have committed faults. Defender of the Dharma holds control over the Legislative Body Power both exoterically and esoterically. He watches over the positive progress of the disciples in the Way of God, and guides all evolved souls to Bát-Quái-Đài for the union with Angels, Saints, Immortals and Buddhas.
Thượng-Phẩm (上品) (The head of Religious Affairs)
Representative of the Ho-Phap in the formation of virtuous souls of the Sacerdotal Council. He depends on the Hộ-Pháp in all his missions. The Thượng-Phẩm helps the Cửu Trùng Đài to live in an atmosphere of happiness; he reveals the Heavenly Voice to virtuous souls, and guides them to the Divine Phase of the Great Spirits, while closing behind them the door of regression. He considers the priestly laws to take up the defense of all clergy and adepts; he prevents all perversion of the Divine Rules, and helps all initiates to attain their aim. He is simultaneously the President of the Hall of Defense and protector of all disciples. The Thượng-Phẩm is "Leader of the Spiritual Power".
Thượng–Sanh (上生) (The head of Secular Affairs)
has control of all the laws and rules which relate to the worldly life of all adepts to guide them out of the sea of sufferings. He may present a formal complaint before the religious Tribunal against all those who impede the faithful as they move along the Way of God. He is the President of the Hall of Accusation.

Four "zodiacal dignitaries" under each of these branches carry the four key responsibilities of conservation, renovation, reformation, and legislation. They are further assisted by twelve technical academicians, including Bảo Huyền Linh Quân (Theosophy), Bảo Tinh Quân (Astronomy), Bảo Cô Quân (Orphanage), Bảo Văn pháp quân (Culture), Bảo Học Quân (Education), Bảo Y Quân (Health), Bảo Vật Quân (Science and Industry), Bảo Sĩ Quân (Literature), Bảo Sanh Quân (Social work), Bảo Nông Quân (Agriculture), Bảo Công Quân (Public Works), and Bảo Thương Quân (Economics).

=== Community structure ===
Any local area having more than 500 believers is authorized to establish a Parish (Họ Đạo/Tộc Đạo) with a Thánh-Thất (Temple, Church, Holy House) which is led by the authority of a dignitary. Parishes can be established only with the permission and authority of the Giao-Tong/Pope.

Twice a month, the first and the fifteenth day of the lunar calendar, the believers must meet at the Thánh-Thất of the local area to attend the ceremony and listen to the teachings. Exception can be made for those with reasonable excuses.

== Branches ==
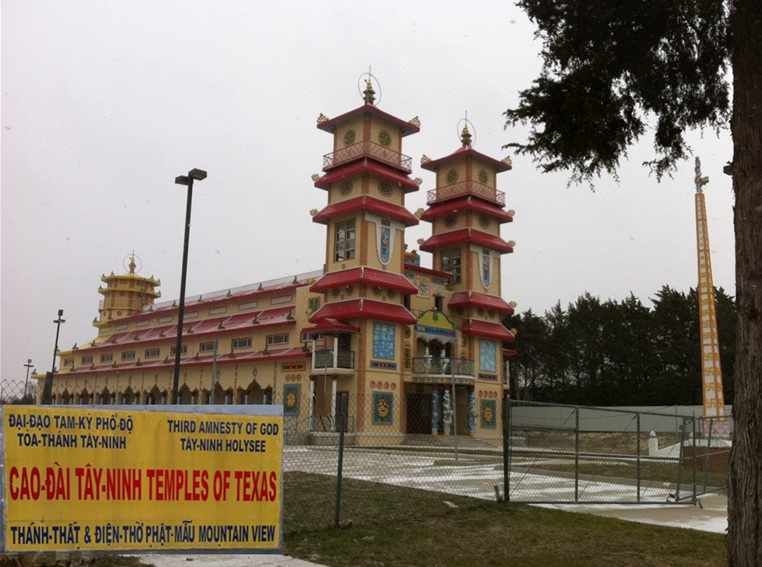
Caodaist temple in Dallas, Texas, serving a large local Vietnamese community

"The period between 1934 and 1975 witnessed not only the robust development of the Cao Dai religion but also saw the separation of the Cao Dai religion into different independent sects, sometimes as many as 30." As of July 2014, "central and provincial authorities have granted legal recognition" to 11 Cao Dai sects.

These sects generally divide along geographic lines. The largest is based in Tây Ninh Province, where the religion was founded in 1926 and where the seat of the Caodaist authority is located.

The Caodaist Executive Council of Tây Ninh Province received official government recognition in 1997. Independent Caodaist groups allege that government interference has undermined the independence of the Tây Ninh group, and it no longer faithfully upholds Cao Đài's principles and traditions. Religious training takes place at individual temples rather than at centralized seminaries. Some Caodaist sects that have broken away from the Tây Ninh Holy See are Cầu Kho, Bến Tre, Minh Chơn Lý, Minh Chơn Đạo, Tiên Thiên, and Hội Thánh Truyền Giáo Trung Việt. Ngô Văn Chiêu founded Chiếu Minh when he left the original church structure, refusing his appointment as Caodaism's first pope.

== See also ==
- Ama-gi
- Hòa Hảo
- New religious movement
- Ngọc Hoàng
- Nguyễn Thành Phương
- Queen Mother of the West
- Slave Ship, a science-fiction novel which involves Cao Đài and its pope.
- Taoism
- Three teachings
- Trình Minh Thế
- Xiantiandao
- Yiguandao

== Sources ==
- Biederman, Patricia Ward (7 January 2006). "Cao Dai fuses great faiths of the world". The Los Angeles Times. Archived from the original on 22 December 2014.
- Carrasco, David; Warmind, Morten; Hawley, John Stratton; Reynolds, Frank; Giarardot, Norman; Neusner, Jacob; Pelikan, Jaroslav; Campo, Juan; Penner, Hans (1999). Wendy Doniger (ed.). Merriam-Webster's Encyclopedia of World Religions. Merriam-Webster. p. 140. ISBN 978-0-87779-044-0.
- Eller, Jack David (2014). Introducing Anthropology of Religion: Culture to the Ultimate. Routledge. ISBN 978-1-317-57914-4.
- Hoskins, Janet Alison (2012a). What Are Vietnam's Indigenous Religions? (PDF) (Report). Center for Southeast Asian Studies, Kyoto University. pp. 4–6. Archived (PDF) from the original on 3 March 2016.
- Hoskins, Janet Alison (2012b). "God's Chosen People": Race, Religion and Anti-Colonial Struggle in French Indochina (Report). Asia Research Institute of the National University of Singapore. Archived from the original on 10 May 2022.
- Hoskins, Janet Alison (2015). The Divine Eye and the Diaspora: Vietnamese syncretism becomes transpacific Caodaism. Honolulu: University of Hawaii Press. ISBN 978-0-8248-5140-8.
- Hộ-Pháp Phạm Công Tắc. Divine Path to Eternal Life. Sydney Centre for Studies in Caodaism (Report). Archived from the original on 12 August 2015.
- "Press Statement on the visit to the Socialist Republic of Viet Nam by the Special Rapporteur on freedom of religion or belief". Office of the United Nations High Commissioner for Human Rights (Press release). Hanoi, Viet Nam. 31 July 2014. Archived from the original on 10 October 2017.
- Oliver, Victor L. (1976). Caodai Spiritism: A Study of Religion in Vietnamese Society. BRILL. ISBN 978-90-04-04547-7. Archived from the original on 14 April 2023.
- Cao Dai Rituals. Sydney Centre for Studies in Caodaism (Report). Archived from the original on 12 August 2015.
- "Caodaism in a nutshell", Sydney Centre for Studies in Caodaism, archived from the original on 26 December 2018
- KINH THIÊN-ĐẠO & THẾ-ĐẠO. Sydney Centre for Studies in Caodaism (Report) (in Vietnamese). Archived from the original on 24 August 2015.
- Structure of CaoDai Religion. Sydney Centre for Studies in Caodaism (Report). Archived from the original on 21 July 2015.
- The New Canonical Codes. Sydney Centre for Studies in Caodaism (Report). Archived from the original on 23 September 2015.
- The outline of Caodaism. Sydney Centre for Studies in Caodaism (Report). Archived from the original on 26 December 2018.
- Tâm, Đào Công (8 November 1996). The Religious Constitution of Cao Đài Religion. Sydney Centre for Studies in Caodaism (Report). University of Sydney. Archived from the original on 12 August 2015.
- Tam, Dao (2000). Understanding Caodaism in 10 minutes (Report). University of Sydney. Archived from the original on 21 September 2009.
- "Vietnam Timeline 1955". VietnamGear.com. Archived from the original on 3 July 2015.
- Hoskins, Janet Alison. "Caodaism". World Religion and Spirituality. 0037768610375520. Archived from the original on 29 April 2018 – via wrldrels.org.
- Jammes, Jeremy (2014). Les Oracles du Cao Dai: Étude d'un mouvement religieux vietnamien et de ses réseaux. Paris: Les Indes Savantes. ISBN 978-2-84654-351-4.
- "Vietnam". International Religious Freedom Report 2005. Bureau of Democracy, Human Rights, and Labor (Report). U.S. Department of State. 30 June 2005. Archived from the original on 13 January 2012.
- Cao Dai Overseas Missionary (7 January 2008). "Cao Dai FAQ". caodai.net. Archived from the original on 15 August 2011.
