= Hiệp Thiên Đài =

Ruling body in Caodaism

Hiệp Thiên Đài or Palace Uniting Heaven and Earth is the legislative branch of the governing body of the Cao Đài Church. The name literally means "where man communes with God".

== Hierarchy ==
It is stipulated by the Constitution of Hiệp Thiên Đài that the top-ranking dignitary be Hộ Pháp, assisted by Thượng Sanh and Thượng Phẩm. Hộ Pháp, hượng Sanh and Thượng Phẩm also lead three divisions each of which includes four other dignitaries called Thời Quân as follows.

- Hộ Pháp – Bảo Pháp – Hiến Pháp – Khai Pháp – Tiếp Pháp
- Thượng Phẩm - Bảo Đạo – Hiến Đạo – Khai Đạo – Tiếp Đạo
- Thượng Sanh - Bảo Thế – Hiến Thế – Khai Thế – Tiếp Thế

Directly under those are the lower-ranking dignitaries:

1. Tiếp Dẫn Đạo Nhơn
2. Chưởng Ấn
3. Cải Trạng
4. Giáo Đạo
5. Thừa Sử
6. Truyền Trạng
7. Sĩ Tải
8. Luật Sự

Adherents must pass a qualifying examination to become a Luật Sự. Adherents will be promote to the next rank with enough required experience. Unlike Cửu Trùng Đài, where an adherent can be promoted to as high as Giáo Tông, Hiệp Thiên Đài only allows believers to achieve the ranks of Thời Quân. After Hộ Pháp Phạm Công Tắc, Thượng Phẩm Cao Quỳnh Cư and Thượng Sanh Cao Hoài Sang, there are no replacements designed.
