= Great Divine Temple =

Caodaist temple in Tây Ninh, Vietnam

- Tòa Thánh Tây Ninh
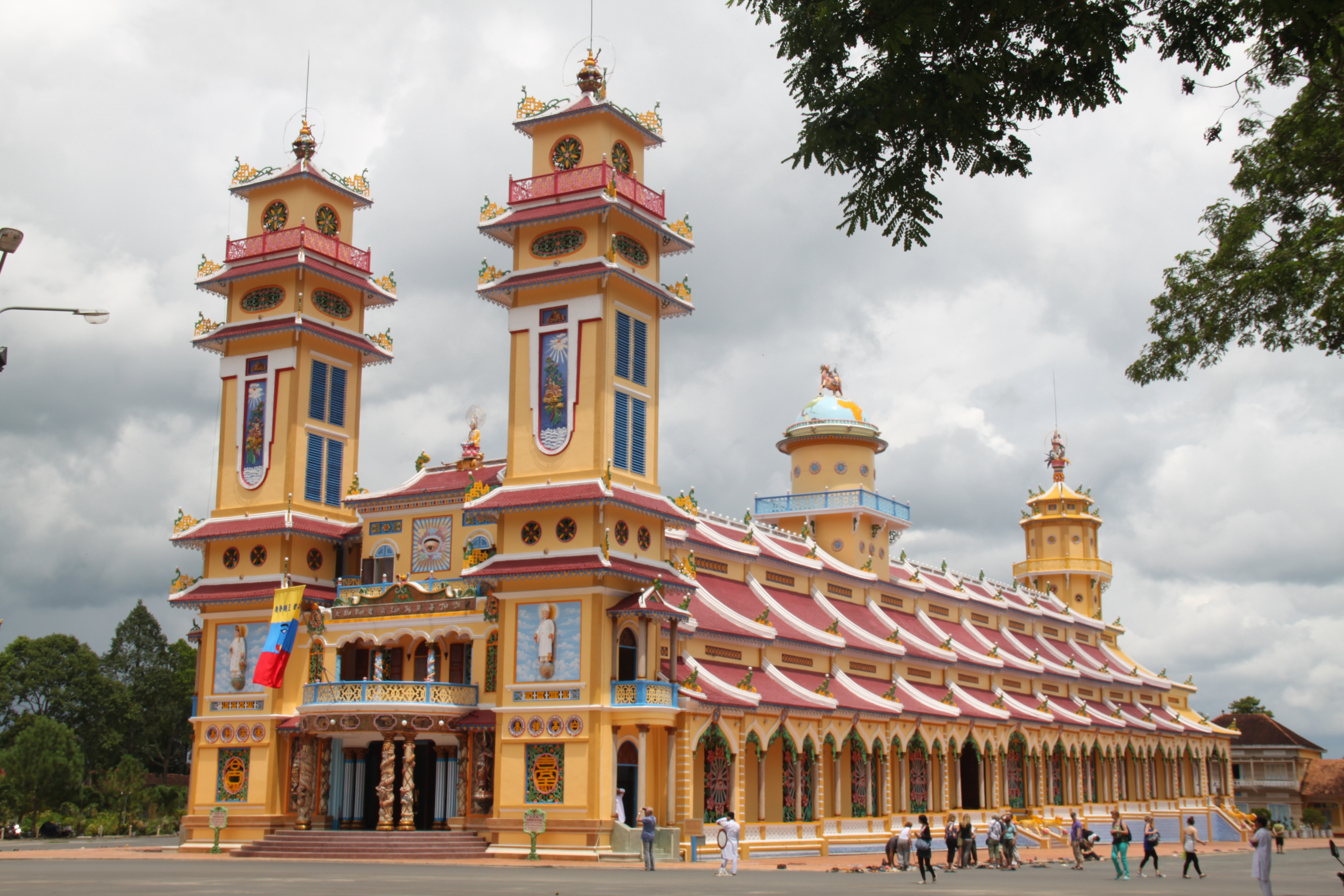
- View of the Great Divine Temple

Religion
- Affiliation: Caodaism

Location
- Location: Tây Ninh province
- Country: Vietnam
- Interactive map of Great Divine Temple
- Coordinates: 11°18′14″N 106°08′00″E

Architecture
- Groundbreaking: 1931
- Completed: 1947

Specifications
- Length: 97.5 metres (320 ft)
- Width: 22 metres (72 ft)

The Great Divine Temple, also known as the Cao Dai Cathedral (/ˌkaʊ ˈdaɪ/) or the Tay Ninh Holy See (Vietnamese: Tòa Thánh Tây Ninh Vietnamese pronunciation: [twaː˨˩ tʰan˦˥ təj˧˧ nɨn˧˧]), is a religious building in the Cao Dai Holy See complex in Tây Ninh province, Southeast Vietnam. It is the first and most important temple of Caodaism in Vietnam.

== History ==
Following the establishment of the religion in 1926, 96 acres of forested land at Bau Ca Na in Long Thanh hamlet, previously owned by a Frenchman called Aspar, was acquired for the construction of the Holy See. Groundbreaking took place in 1931, but due to insufficient budget, the actual construction did not start until 1936. The building was completed in 1947.

== Architecture ==
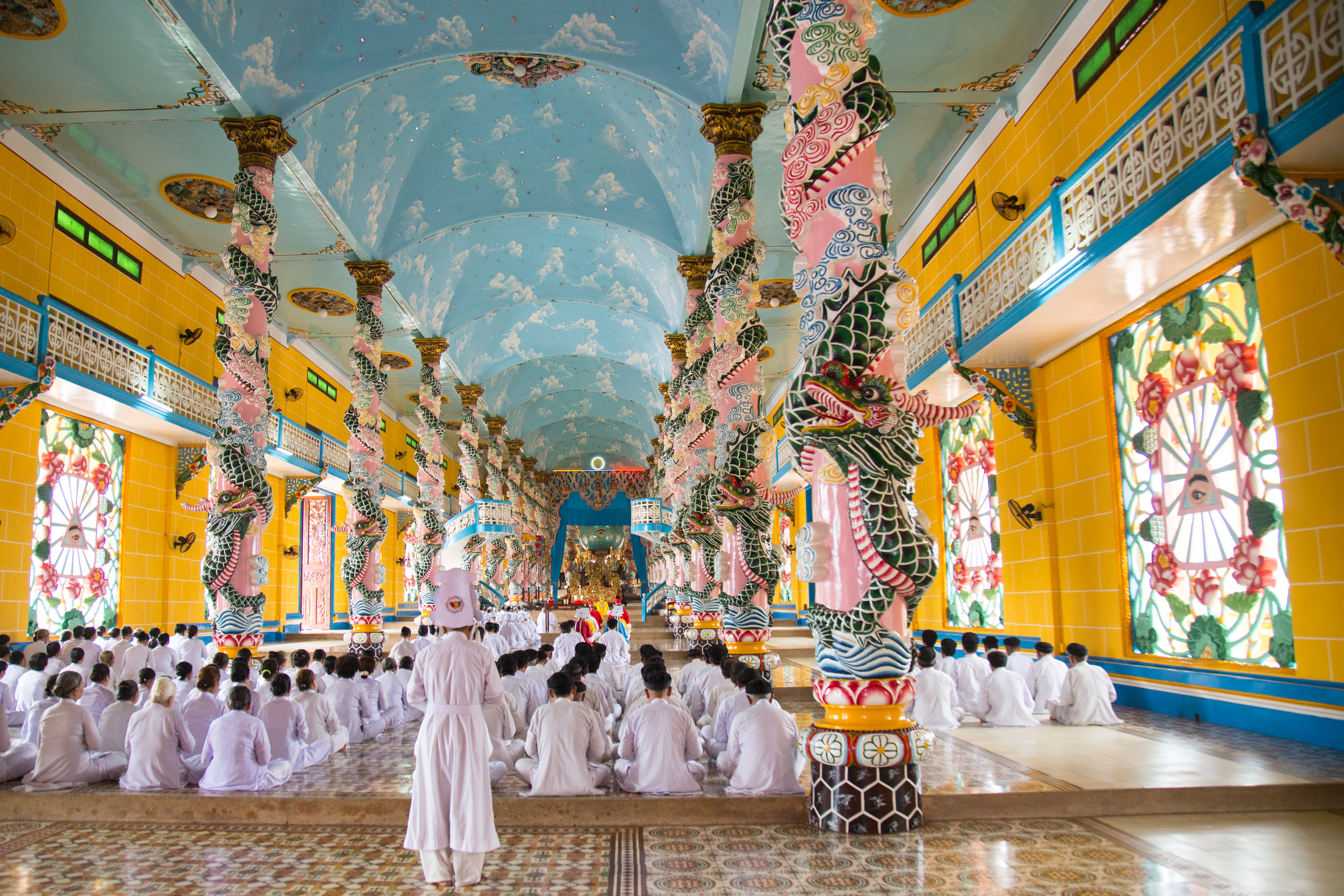
Interior of the Great Divine Temple

The Cao Đài Holy Land is located 5 kilometres (3.1 mi) east of Tây Ninh, the provincial capital, and 100 kilometres (62 mi) northwest of Ho Chi Minh City. It covers an area of approximately 1 square kilometre (0.39 sq mi) and has a total of twelve entrances, including a main gate known as Chánh Môn and eleven numbered gates. The main gate is kept closed, except when guests are arriving.

The Holy See complex consists of the central Great Divine Temple, the main administrative offices, residences for high officials and adepts working on the grounds, and other major facilities. The building is oriented east to west, with its rear area facing east and its two-towered façade facing west. The temple is 97.5 metres (320 ft) long and 22 metres (72 ft) wide. The temple building consists of three areas. From front to back, they are: Hiệp Thiên Đài, Cửu Trùng Đài, and Bát Quái Đài. The interior of the temple is decorated with the symbol of the Divine Eye worshipped by Caodaists.

The front part, Hiệp Thiên Đài, has two 27-meter-tall towers on either side. The left is a bell tower and the right is a drum tower. Each tower has six floors whose heights are not the same. The bottom three floors are connected by a structure that spans the space between the towers. The ground floor of this connecting structure, immediately behind the main entrance, is known as Tịnh Tâm Điện. It is divided into three spaces with the main hall in the middle, and the right and left sides serving as entry spaces for men and for women, respectively.

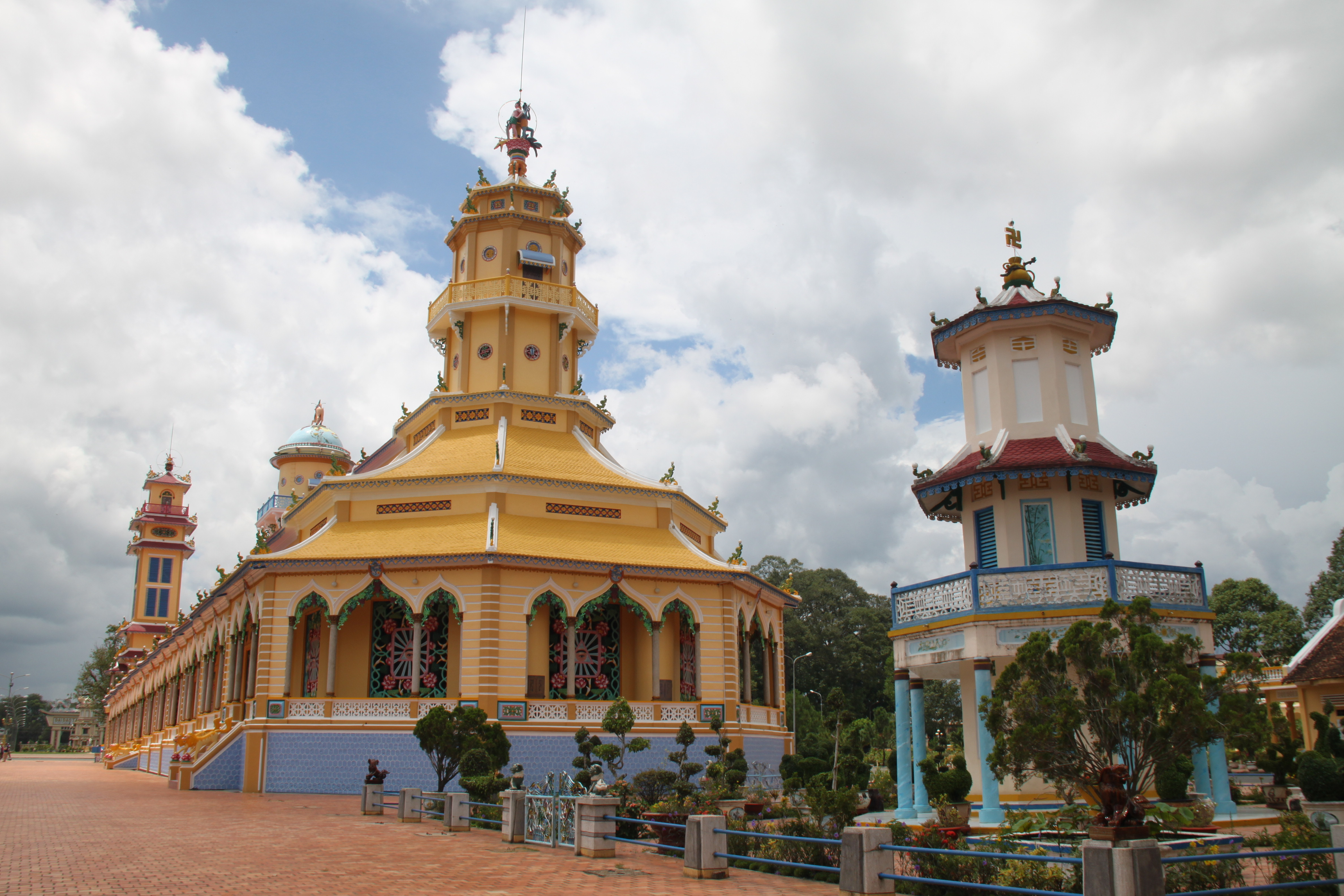
View of the temple from the back

The middle part of the temple is Cửu Trùng Đài, a long space divided into nine levels from low to high, corresponding to the nine ranks in the Cao Đài spiritual hierarchy. The fifth level is the area for bishops. On the roof right above this level rises a high tower known as Nghinh Phong Đài. Its lower half is square, while its upper part is circular.

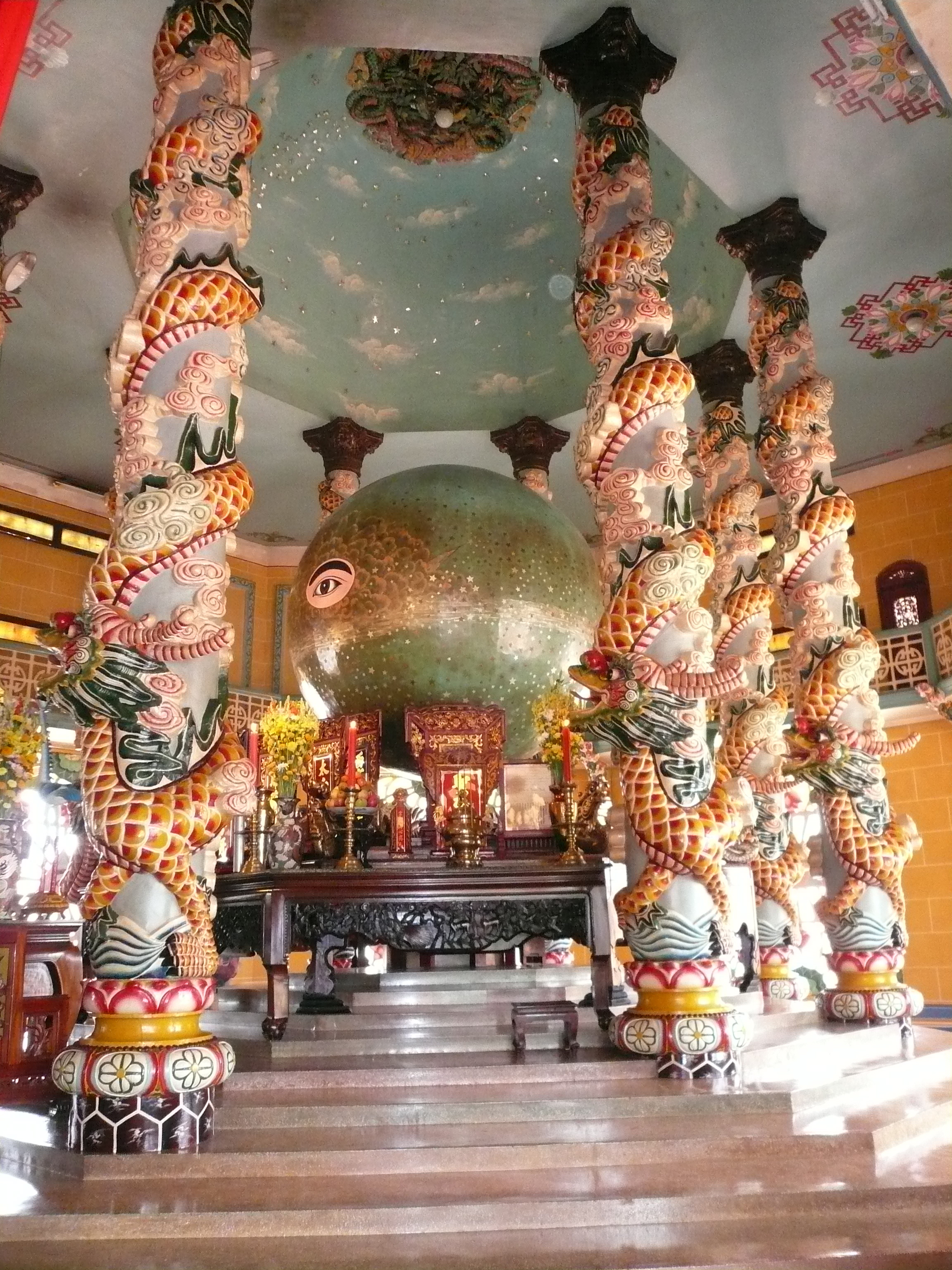
The Can-Khon ball

The last part of the Great Divine Temple is the Bát Quái Đài, which consists of a high octagonal-shaped tower. In Caodaist tradition, this is the place of Đức chí Tôn (Jade Emperor), Saints, Buddhas, and Fairies. It is considered the soul of the temple. The eight sides of Bát Quái Đài correspond to a part of Bagua, including Qian, Dui, Li, Zhen, Xun, Kan, Gen, Kun.

The floor of the Bát Quái Đài is a twelve-tiered octagonal platform. In the center, on the highest level, is a large ball with a 3.3-metre (11 ft) diameter, called the cosmos ball or the Qian-Kun ball, which represents the Jade Emperor's universe. The ball bears a large Divine Eye symbol. The Great Divine Temple is the only place that has the Qian-Kun ball, since other Caodaism temples are not allowed to have it.
