= Slave Ship (Pohl novel) =

1956 novel by Frederik Pohl

- First edition, published by Ballantine Books
- Author: Frederik Pohl
- Language: English
- Published: 1956
- Publication place: USA
- Pages: 160

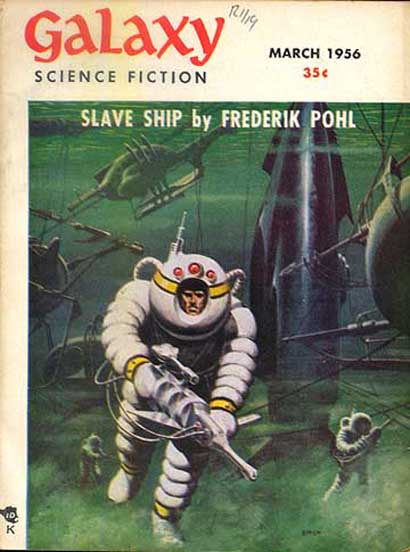
Slave Ship, Pohl's first solo novel, was serialized in Galaxy in 1956

Slave Ship is a 1956 short science fiction novel by American writer Frederik Pohl, originally serialized in Galaxy. The scene is a world in the throes of a low-intensity global war, which appears to be an amplified representation of the Vietnam War, in which the U.S. was just beginning to be involved. The plot involves telepathy, speaking to animals, and, in the last few pages, an invasion by extraterrestrials.

The nominal adversaries in the novel are known as "cow-dyes", a corruption of Caodai, a religion of Vietnamese origin. On the American side, telepaths, who are used in espionage and other covert activities, are falling victim to "the glotch", a fatal affliction which is believed to be a Caodai bio-weapon, transmitted telepathically.

== Reception ==
Galaxy reviewer Floyd C. Gale praised the novel as "an authentically convincing picture of a wartime navy and . . . a think-tank tickler." Anthony Boucher reported Slave Ship to be "at once fascinating and disappointing." Boucher praised Pohl for his "Heinleinesque skill in the detailed indirect exposition of a convincing future," but faulted the novel as episodic, weakly characterized, and arbitrarily resolved.
