= Phạm Công Tắc =

Caodaiist religious figure (1890–1959)

Dharmapala (Hộ Pháp) Phạm Công Tắc
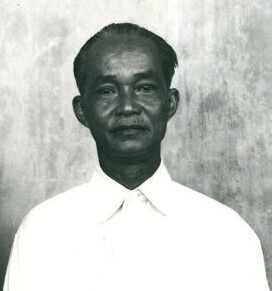
- Born: June 21, 1890; Long An, French Indochina
- Died: 1959 (aged 68–69); Phnom Penh, Cambodia
- Known for: Leader of Caodaism
- Spouse: Nguyễn Hương Nhiều

Phạm Công Tắc (1890–1959) was a Vietnamese leader in the establishment and development of the Caodaism religion, founded in 1926. He was the head spirit medium and chief administrator of Cadaoism in Tây Ninh. He became the most influential medium of the religion following the death of Cao Quỳnh Cư in 1929, and was an initiator of the Caodaist canon.

Born to a Catholic father and a Buddhist mother, he attended the Lycée Chasseloup-Laubat in Saigon at age 16. He died in Phnom Penh, Cambodia in 1959, after three years in exile amidst the rise of Ngô Đình Diệm.
